= Live from the Mountain Music Lounge discography =

KMTT 103.7 FM The Mountain discography
- Cover of the latest edition of Live from...
- Live albums: 18

Live from the Mountain Music Lounge is a limited edition annual compilation of live musical performances released by radio station KMTT 103.7 FM in Seattle, Washington. All performances are recorded in a small, intimate stage setting called the Carter Subaru Mountain Music Lounge, located within the building of the station's offices in the Denny Triangle area of Seattle. Featured artists represent the long-time Adult Album Alternative music format for which the station was prominently known from 1991 to 2011 prior to a switch to its current Classic rock-heavy Triple-A format in November 2011.

Under the title On the Mountain: Collector's Edition of Live Performances, KMTT self-published the first compilation of recorded songs and released them through local Seattle retailers in November 1995. Following the success of the first album, the station began an annual tradition of publishing compilations, with portions of the proceeds donated to the benefit of The Wilderness Society. Each year, KMTT selects a single retailer to exclusively offer the CDs. Past retailers have included Starbucks, REI, and Fred Meyer.

Starting with the ninth volume, the series was retitled Live from the Mountain Music Lounge. As of November 2012, there have been 18 volumes released, including a double-album for the tenth installment that featured a tenth volume and a collection of the "best" tracks from the first nine volumes.

== Albums ==
=== Live albums ===
Title	Album details	Peak chart positions							Certifications (sales threshold)
Title	Album details	US	AUS	GER	IRL	NL	NZ	UK	Certifications (sales threshold)
On the Mountain: Collector's Edition of Live Performances	Release date: November 1995; Label: KMTT; Formats: CD	—	—	—	—	—	—	—	
Captured Live: On the Mountain 2	Release date: November 1996; Label: KMTT; Formats: CD	—	—	—	—	—	—	—	
On the Mountain 3	Release date: November 1997; Label: KMTT; Formats: CD	—	—	—	—	—	—	—	
On the Mountain 4	Release date: November 1998; Label: KMTT; Formats: CD	—	—	—	—	—	—	—	
On the Mountain 5	Release date: November 1999; Label: KMTT/Starbucks Coffee Co.; Formats: CD	—	—	—	—	—	—	—	
On the Mountain Six	Release date: November 2000; Label: KMTT/Starbucks Coffee Co.; Formats: CD	—	—	—	—	—	—	—	
On the Mountain 7	Release date: November 2001; Label: KMTT/Starbucks Coffee Co.; Formats: CD	—	—	—	—	—	—	—	
On the Mountain 8	Release date: November 2002; Label: KMTT/Starbucks Coffee Co.; Formats: CD	—	—	—	—	—	—	—	
Live from the Mountain Music Lounge Volume 9	Release date: November 2003; Label: KMTT/Starbucks Coffee Co.; Formats: CD	—	—	—	—	—	—	—	
Live from the Mountain Music Lounge Volume 10 Plus Best of Volumes 1–9	Release date: November 2004; Label: KMTT/Starbucks Coffee Co.; Formats: CD	—	—	—	—	—	—	—	
Live from the Mountain Music Lounge Volume 11	Release date: November 2005; Label: KMTT/Starbucks Coffee Co.; Formats: CD	—	—	—	—	—	—	—	
Live from the Mountain Music Lounge Volume 12	Release date: November 2006; Label: KMTT/Starbucks Coffee Co.; Formats: CD	—	—	—	—	—	—	—	
Live from the Mountain Music Lounge Volume 13	Release date: November 2007; Label: KMTT/Starbucks Coffee Co./AT&T; Formats: CD	—	—	—	—	—	—	—	
Live from the Mountain Music Lounge Volume 14	Release date: November 2008; Label: KMTT/Starbucks Coffee Co.; Formats: CD	—	—	—	—	—	—	—	
Live from the Mountain Music Lounge Volume 15	Release date: November 2009; Label: KMTT/Starbucks Coffee Co.; Formats: CD	—	—	—	—	—	—	—	
Live from the Mountain Music Lounge Volume 16	Release date: November 2010; Label: KMTT/REI; Formats: CD	—	—	—	—	—	—	—	
Live from the Mountain Music Lounge Volume 17	Release date: November 2011; Label: KMTT/REI; Formats: CD	—	—	—	—	—	—	—	
Live from the Mountain Music Lounge Volume 18 – The Essential Collection	Release date: November 9, 2012; Label: KMTT/Fred Meyer, Inc.; Formats: CD, LP	—	—	—	—	—	—	—	
"—" denotes releases that did not chart or were not released to that country

== Track listings ==
=== On the Mountain: Collector's Edition of Live Performances track listing ===
No.	Title	Performer(s)	Length
1.	"Good Things"	BoDeans	—
2.	"Round of Blues"	Shawn Colvin	—
3.	"Little Victories"	Darden Smith	—
4.	"Crazy on You" (Heart song)	The Lovemongers	—
5.	"Yes I Am"	Melissa Etheridge	—
6.	"Angel"	John Hiatt	—
7.	"Brother John"	Big Head Todd and the Monsters	—
8.	"Bohemia"	Mae Moore	—
9.	"Too Long in the Wasteland"	James McMurtry	—
10.	"New York City"	Sonia Dada	—
11.	"Johnny Have You Seen Her"	The Rembrandts	—
12.	"Superman's Song"	Crash Test Dummies	—
13.	"Dig Down Deep"	Marc Cohn	—

=== Captured Live: On the Mountain 2 track listing ===
No.	Title	Performer(s)	Length
1.	"Power of Two"	Indigo Girls	—
2.	"In a Daydream"	The Freddy Jones Band	—
3.	"5 Days in May"	Blue Rodeo	—
4.	"Good Enough"	Sarah McLachlan	—
5.	"Fly From Heaven"	Toad the Wet Sprocket	—
6.	"Furniture"	John Gorka	—
7.	"If These Walls Could Speak"	Shawn Colvin	—
8.	"Running from an Angel"	Hootie & the Blowfish	—
9.	"Get Together" (The Youngbloods song)	Jesse Colin Young	—
10.	"The Lady of Shalott" (Victorian ballad)	Loreena McKennitt	—
11.	"Can't Get High" (Bloodkin song)	Widespread Panic	—
12.	"Mary Jane"	Spin Doctors	—
13.	"Bank Robber"	Timbuk3	—
14.	"You'll Be Satisfied"	The Subdudes	—
15.	"Safety in Self"	Jeffrey Gaines	—
16.	"Jolene" (Dolly Parton song)	Paula Cole	—

=== On the Mountain 3 track listing ===
No.	Title	Performer(s)	Length
1.	"Three Marlenas"	The Wallflowers	—
2.	"Déjà Vu" (CSNY song)	David Crosby	—
3.	"Caramel"	Suzanne Vega	—
4.	"Please Don't Tell Her"	Big Head Todd and the Monsters	—
5.	"Congo Square"	Sonny Landreth	—
6.	"Put You Down"	Alejandro Escovedo	—
7.	"Barely Breathing"	Duncan Sheik	—
8.	"Sleep to Dream"	Fiona Apple	—
9.	"Back Door Love"	Graham Parker	—
10.	"This Misery"	Wild Colonials	—
11.	"Small Wonders"	Dog's Eye View	—
12.	"Stray Cat Strut"	The Brian Setzer Orchestra	—
13.	"It Doesn't Have to Be That Way"	Pete Droge	—
14.	"Doughnut Song"	Tori Amos	—
15.	"Shanty"	Jonathan Edwards	—

=== On the Mountain 4 track listing ===
No.	Title	Performer(s)	Length
1.	"You Can Love Yourself"	Keb' Mo'	—
2.	"Already Home"	Marc Cohn	—
3.	"Shame on You"	Indigo Girls	—
4.	"Spacey & Shakin'"	Pete Droge	—
5.	"Building a Mystery"	Sarah McLachlan	—
6.	"Meet Virginia"	Train	—
7.	"She Cries Your Name"	Beth Orton	—
8.	"As the Rain"	Jeb Loy Nichols	—
9.	"Part of the Process"	Morcheeba	—
10.	"32 Flavors" (Ani DiFranco song)	Alana Davis	—
11.	"16 Days"	Whiskeytown	—
12.	"The Real Low Down"	Elaine Summers	—
13.	"Molinos"	The Paperboys	—
14.	"It Hurt So Bad"	Susan Tedeschi	—
15.	"Sexual Healing" (Marvin Gaye song)	Ben Harper	—

=== On the Mountain 5 track listing ===
No.	Title	Performer(s)	Length
1.	"Lullaby"	Shawn Mullins	—
2.	"Diving to Be Deeper"	Sinéad Lohan	—
3.	"Fly So High"	Peter Himmelman	—
4.	"Rock 'n' Roll Doctor"	Little Feat	—
5.	"Something's Goin' On in My Room" (Daddy Cleanhead song)	Colin James and the Little Big Band	—
6.	"Wiggly Fingers"	Patty Griffin	—
7.	"Overkill" (Men at Work song)	Colin Hay	—
8.	"Bears"	Lyle Lovett	—
9.	"Breakin' Me"	Jonny Lang	—
10.	"Spooky" (Classics IV song)	Joan Osborne	—
11.	"Little Heaven"	Cesar Rosas (of Los Lobos)	—
12.	"You Need to Be with Me"	Susan Tedeschi	—
13.	"Living with the Law"	Chris Whitley	—
14.	"So It Goes"	Wes Cunningham	—
15.	"Skin and Teeth"	Joe Henry	—

=== On the Mountain Six track listing ===
No.	Title	Performer(s)	Length
1.	"Please Forgive Me"	David Gray	—
2.	"Why Does It Always Rain on Me?"	Travis	—
3.	"Step Outside"	Left Hand Smoke	—
4.	"Mrs. Potter's Lullaby"	Counting Crows	—
5.	"Peace Tonight"	Indigo Girls	—
6.	"Bourée/Living in the Past" (Jethro Tull songs)	Ian Anderson	—
7.	"No Mermaid"	Sinéad Lohan	—
8.	"In Your Eyes" (Peter Gabriel song)	Jeffrey Gaines	—
9.	"Wolf at the Door"	Patty Larkin	—
10.	"Testimony"	Willis	—
11.	"Grateful"	Patti Smith	—
12.	"Before I Go"	John Hiatt	—
13.	"Come Around"	Kim Richey	—
14.	"True Friends"	Shannon Curfman	—
15.	"Poets"	The Tragically Hip	—
16.	"Goodnight Moon"	Shivaree	—
17.	"Hold On"	Tom Waits	—

=== On the Mountain 7 track listing ===
No.	Title	Performer(s)	Length
1.	"One Headlight"	The Wallflowers	—
2.	"I'm So Open"	Cowboy Junkies	—
3.	"Life on a Chain"	Pete Yorn	—
4.	"Linger"	Jonatha Brooke	—
5.	"Easy Tonight"	Five for Fighting	—
6.	"Show Biz Kids" (Steely Dan song)	Rickie Lee Jones	—
7.	"Radar"	Chris Whitley	—
8.	"Essence"	Lucinda Williams	—
9.	"Chemistry"	Semisonic	—
10.	"It's Different for Girls"	Joe Jackson	—
11.	"Humdrum"	Carrie Akre	—
12.	"Hello It's Me"	Fisher	—
13.	"Girl Inside My Head"	Blues Traveler	—
14.	"Righteous Love"	Joan Osborne	—
15.	"Like Humans Do"	David Byrne	—

==== Bonus track listing ====
No.	Title	Performer(s)	Length
16.	"Feel It"	Fisher	—

=== On the Mountain 8 track listing ===
No.	Title	Performer(s)	Length
1.	"Don't Know Why" (Jesse Harris song)	Norah Jones	—
2.	"Bittersweet"	Big Head Todd and the Monsters	—
3.	"Sea of No Cares"	Great Big Sea	—
4.	"Flake"	Jack Johnson	—
5.	"Gotta Get It Worked On"	Delbert McClinton	—
6.	"Never Recover"	Dave Pirner (of Soul Asylum)	—
7.	"Moment of Forgiveness"	Indigo Girls	—
8.	"Lovers in a Dangerous Time"	Bruce Cockburn	—
9.	"Storm"	North Mississippi Allstars	—
10.	"Freeker by the Speaker"	Keller Williams	—
11.	"Luka"	Suzanne Vega	—
12.	"Ghost"	Howie Day	—
13.	"The Way I Am"	Martin Sexton	—
14.	"Invitation"	Carrie Akre	—
15.	"Spooky Girlfriend"	Elvis Costello	—
16.	"With My Heart in Your Hands"	Peter Stuart (of Dog's Eye View)	—
17.	"Fall at Your Feet" (Crowded House song)	Neil Finn	—
18.	"Amazing Grace" (Christian hymn)	Blind Boys of Alabama	—

=== Live from the Mountain Music Lounge Volume 9 track listing ===
No.	Title	Performer(s)	Length
1.	"Lighthouse"	The Waifs	—
2.	"Tailspin"	The Jayhawks	—
3.	"Pickapart"	The John Butler Trio	—
4.	"The Boxer"	Carbon Leaf	—
5.	"Come Around"	Rhett Miller	—
6.	"The Last Good Day of the Year"	Cousteau	—
7.	"Summertime Thing"	Chuck Prophet	—
8.	"You Can't Hide"	Maktub	—
9.	"The World is What You Make It"	Paul Brady	—
10.	"If I Had a Boat"	Lyle Lovett	—
11.	"True to Myself"	Ziggy Marley	—
12.	"A Sorta Fairytale"	Tori Amos	—
13.	"How Good Can It Get"	The Wallflowers	—
14.	"Suspicious Minds" (Mark James/Elvis Presley song)	Pete Yorn	—
15.	"Spit on a Stranger" (Pavement song)	Nickel Creek	—
16.	"Drive South"	John Hiatt	—
17.	"Amsterdam"	Guster	—
18.	"Destiny"	Zero 7	—
19.	"You and I Both"	Jason Mraz	—

=== Live from the Mountain Music Lounge Volume 10 track listing ===
==== Disc 1 ====
No.	Title	Performer(s)	Length
1.	"Gravedigger"	Dave Matthews Band	—
2.	"Ironic"	Alanis Morissette	—
3.	"Disease"	Matchbox Twenty	—
4.	"Angel"	Sarah McLachlan	—
5.	"Half-Acre"	Hem	—
6.	"All at Sea"	Jamie Cullum	—
7.	"Orange Sky"	Alexi Murdoch	—
8.	"Down Under"	Colin Hay	—
9.	"Diamonds on the Inside"	Ben Harper	—
10.	"Come to My Window"	Melissa Etheridge	—
11.	"If It Makes You"	BoDeans	—
12.	"Come to Jesus"	Mindy Smith	—
13.	"Volcano"	Damien Rice	—
14.	"Galileo"	Indigo Girls	—
15.	"Heaven"	Los Lonely Boys	—
16.	"Super Duper Love (Are You Diggin' on Me)"	Joss Stone	—
17.	"Everyone Deserves Music"	Michael Franti & Spearhead	—

==== Disc 2: Best of Volumes 1–9 ====
No.	Title	Performer(s)	Length
1.	"Good Things" (from Vol. 1)	BoDeans	—
2.	"Flake" (from Vol. 8)	Jack Johnson	—
3.	"5 Days in May" (from Vol. 2)	Blue Rodeo	—
4.	"One Headlight" (from Vol. 7)	The Wallflowers	—
5.	"Power of Two" (from Vol. 2)	Indigo Girls	—
6.	"Overkill" (from Vol. 5)	Colin Hay	—
7.	"Lullaby" (from Vol. 5)	Shawn Mullins	—
8.	"Hold On" (from Vol. 6)	Tom Waits	—
9.	"Fall at Your Feet" (from Vol. 8)	Neil Finn	—
10.	"Please Forgive Me" (from Vol. 6)	David Gray	—
11.	"Don't Know Why" (from Vol. 8)	Norah Jones	—
12.	"Meet Virginia" (from Vol. 4)	Train	—
13.	"Wiggly Fingers" (from Vol. 5)	Patty Griffin	—
14.	"The Boxer" (from Vol. 9)	Carbon Leaf	—
15.	"Mrs. Potter's Lullaby" (from Vol. 6)	Counting Crows	—

=== Live from the Mountain Music Lounge Volume 11 track listing ===
No.	Title	Performer(s)	Length
1.	"Let Me Be"	Xavier Rudd	—
2.	"Wordplay"	Jason Mraz	—
3.	"Life Less Ordinary"	Carbon Leaf	—
4.	"Honey I Been Thinking About You"	Jackie Greene	—
5.	"(Who Discovered) America?"	Ozomatli	—
6.	"Catch My Disease"	Ben Lee	—
7.	"Half a Million Dollars (And a Bottle of Red Wine)"	Ian McFeron	—
8.	"Right to Be Wrong"	Joss Stone	—
9.	"Zebra" (The John Butler Trio song)	John Butler	—
10.	"Looking at the World from the Bottom of a Well"	Mike Doughty (of Soul Coughing)	—
11.	"Fake"	The Frames	—
12.	"Don't Come Easy"	Patty Griffin	—
13.	"Pin a Rose on Me"	Chuck Prophet	—
14.	"Keep It Loose, Keep It Tight"	Amos Lee	—
15.	"Sleeps with Butterflies"	Tori Amos	—
16.	"Trouble"	Ray LaMontagne	—
17.	"Won't Give In"	Finn Brothers	—
18.	"Home"	Marc Broussard	—

=== Live from the Mountain Music Lounge Volume 12 track listing ===
No.	Title	Performer(s)	Length
1.	"The One I Love"	David Gray	—
2.	"Mushaboom"	Feist	—
3.	"How We Operate"	Gomez	—
4.	"Voodoo"	LeRoy Bell	—
5.	"Nothing Left to Lose"	Mat Kearney	—
6.	"Black Horse and the Cherry Tree"	KT Tunstall	—
7.	"Colorful"	Rocco DeLuca	—
8.	"When in Rome"	Nickel Creek	—
9.	"London Skies"	Jamie Cullum	—
10.	"Beautiful Wreck"	Shawn Mullins	—
11.	"Soul Meets Body"	Death Cab for Cutie	—
12.	"Someday Never Comes"	Brandi Carlile	—
13.	"One Man Wrecking Machine"	Guster	—
14.	"Cab"	Train	—
15.	"Easy"	Barenaked Ladies	—
16.	"Better Days"	Goo Goo Dolls	—
17.	"Move By Yourself"	Donavon Frankenreiter	—
18.	"Farewell, So Long, Goodbye"	Jackie Greene	—

=== Live from the Mountain Music Lounge Volume 13 track listing ===
No.	Title	Performer(s)	Length
1.	"Is It Any Wonder?"	Keane	—
2.	"I Know I'm Not Alone"	Michael Franti & Spearhead	—
3.	"Fill Me Up"	Shawn Colvin	—
4.	"Father and Daughter"	Paul Simon	—
5.	"Till the Sun Turns Black"	Ray LaMontagne	—
6.	"See the World"	Gomez	—
7.	"Tamacun"	Rodrigo y Gabriela	—
8.	"Fidelity"	Regina Spektor	—
9.	"Better Than"	The John Butler Trio	—
10.	"Save It for Later"	The Beat (aka The English Beat)	—
11.	"She's Mine"	Brett Dennen	—
12.	"The Story"	Brandi Carlile	—
13.	"Golden Days"	The Damnwells	—
14.	"Chasing Cars"	Snow Patrol	—
15.	"Heavenly Day"	Patty Griffin	—
16.	"Calling All Friends"	Low Stars	—
17.	"Car Crash"	Matt Nathanson	—
18.	"Shout Out Loud"	Amos Lee	—

=== Live from the Mountain Music Lounge Volume 14 track listing ===
No.	Title	Performer(s)	Length
1.	"Love Song"	Sara Bareilles	—
2.	"27 Jennifers"	Mike Doughty	—
3.	"Hold On"	KT Tunstall	—
4.	"The One I Love"	David Gray	—
5.	"On My Way"	deSoL	—
6.	"Sweet and Low"	Augustana	—
7.	"Once"	The Swell Season	—
8.	"Save Me"	Aimee Mann	—
9.	"The Way I Am"	Ingrid Michaelson	—
10.	"I'm Yours"	Jason Mraz	—
11.	"No Rain"	Blind Melon	—
12.	"1234"	Feist	—
13.	"Habit Forming"	X Levitation Cult	—
14.	"Madly"	Tristan Prettyman	—
15.	"Dream Catch Me"	Newton Faulkner	—
16.	"Bubbly"	Colbie Caillat	—

=== Live from the Mountain Music Lounge Volume 15 track listing ===
No.	Title	Performer(s)	Length
1.	"Rock and Roll"	Eric Hutchinson	—
2.	"Right as Rain"	Adele	—
3.	"Miss Hollywood"	Carbon Leaf	—
4.	"Shotgun Down the Avalanche"	Shawn Colvin	—
5.	"Come on Get Higher"	Matt Nathanson	—
6.	"It's About Time"	Barcelona	—
7.	"Maybe"	Ingrid Michaelson	—
8.	"Nothing Ever Hurt Like You"	James Morrison	—
9.	"Sometime Around Midnight"	The Airborne Toxic Event	—
10.	"Mercy"	Duffy	—
11.	"I Will Possess Your Heart"	Death Cab for Cutie	—
12.	"Where I Stood"	Missy Higgins	—
13.	"More"	Tyrone Wells	—
14.	"Bobcaygeon"	The Tragically Hip	—
15.	"Closer to Fine"	Brandi Carlile & Indigo Girls	—
16.	"100 Yard Dash"	Raphael Saadiq	—
17.	"Say Hey (I Love You)"	Michael Franti & Spearhead	—

=== Live from the Mountain Music Lounge Volume 16 track listing ===
No.	Title	Performer(s)	Length
1.	"Kandi"	One Eskimo	—
2.	"The High Road"	Broken Bells	—
3.	"Fallin' for You"	Colbie Caillat	—
4.	"The World I Know"	Collective Soul	—
5.	"Favorite Song"	Ben Fuller	—
6.	"Save Me, San Francisco"	Train	—
7.	"King of Anything"	Sara Bareilles	—
8.	"Song Away"	Hockey	—
9.	"You are the Best Thing"	Ray LaMontagne	—
10.	"The Outsiders"	Needtobreathe	—
11.	"Dreams"	Brandi Carlile	—
12.	"Fugitive"	David Gray	—
13.	"Low Rising"	The Swell Season	—
14.	"Satellite Heart"	Anya Marina	—
15.	"The Lover are Losing"	Keane	—
16.	"Stuck on You"	Meiko	—
17.	"The Sound of Sunshine"	Michael Franti & Spearhead	—
18.	"Take Everything"	Greg Laswell	—
19.	"One Way Road"	The John Butler Trio	—

=== Live from the Mountain Music Lounge Volume 17 track listing ===
No.	Title	Performer(s)	Length
1.	"Lost in My Mind"	The Head and the Heart	—
2.	"Do You Love Me?"	Guster	—
3.	"MoneyGrabber"	Fitz and the Tantrums	—
4.	"Give Me Something"	Scars on 45	—
5.	"Beg, Steal or Borrow"	Ray LaMontagne & the Pariah Dogs	—
6.	"Brand New Day"	Trevor Hall	—
7.	"Adia"	Sarah McLachlan	—
8.	"Windows are Rolled Down"	Amos Lee	—
9.	"Hard Lesson"	The Burned	—
10.	"Bound for Glory"	Tedeschi Trucks Band	—
11.	"Let the Light In"	Bob Schneider	—
12.	"Light You Up"	Shawn Mullins	—
13.	"The Cave"	Mumford & Sons	—
14.	"Bring Me Some Water"	Melissa Etheridge	—

=== Live from the Mountain Music Lounge Volume 18 – The Essential Collection track listing ===
No.	Title	Performer(s)	Length
1.	"The One I Love" (from Vol. 14 – 12/15/07)	David Gray	—
2.	"Simple Song" (2/12/12)	The Shins	—
3.	"Trouble" (from Vol. 11 – 9/04)	Ray LaMontagne	—
4.	"Father and Daughter" (from Vol. 13 – 9/06)	Paul Simon	—
5.	"Barton Hollow" (6/23/11)	The Civil Wars	—
6.	"Down in the Valley" (4/11)	The Head and the Heart	—
7.	"Drops of Jupiter" (12/09)	Train	—
8.	"Parted Ways" (4/9/12)	Heartless Bastards	—
9.	"Everybody Knows" (7/27/07)	Ryan Adams	—
10.	"Photobooth" (12/05)	Death Cab for Cutie	—
11.	"I've Been Waiting" (8/22/11)	Matthew Sweet	—
12.	"Broken Hearted Savior" (2/18/12)	Big Head Todd and the Monsters	—
13.	"Pancho and Lefty" (Townes Van Zandt song – 5/11/09)	Steve Earle	—
14.	"Put the Gun Down" (7/18/12)	ZZ Ward	—
15.	"Europa and the Pirate Twins" (10/11/11)	Thomas Dolby	—
