= Ooh La La (Guster album) =

2024 album by Guster

Studio album by Guster
- Released: May 17, 2024
- Studio: Isokon, Woodstock, New York; Guilford Sound, Guilford, Vermont; Ron's Basement, New Jersey
- Length: 37:06
- Label: Ocho Mule
- Producer: Josh Kaufman

Guster chronology
Look Alive (2019)	Ooh La La (2024)

Singles from Ooh La La
- 1. "Keep Going" / "All Day" Released: February 28, 2024; 2. "Maybe We're Alright" Released: April 4, 2024; 3. "The Elevator" Released: April 25, 2024; 4. "When We Were Stars" Released: January 15, 2025

Ooh La La is the ninth studio album by Guster. It was preceded by the singles "Keep Going" and "All Day", and was released on May 17, 2024. It was mainly produced by Josh Kaufman, who had previously produced albums for the National and the Hold Steady. It is their first album since 2019's Look Alive, which was released over five years prior.

== Recording ==
According to frontman Ryan Miller, "Most of these songs were written against the backdrop of what felt like an apocalypse. It was such a transformative time, and we were dealing with a lot of existential questions about what it means to be a father, a husband, a creative person in the midst of all the chaos." Guitarist Adam Gardner stated that "One thing we've continually done as a band is acknowledge what's going on in our world but still bring some positivity to the music. We're always going to be real about what's happening, but we still want to leave people with a feeling of hope." According to Exclaim! magazine, the album "marks a bold departure from its predecessor, 2019's Look Alive, through a bedrock of rich acoustic guitar and lush piano".

== Release ==
The album is preceded by two singles, "All Day" and "Keep Going", which Exclaim! called "a big, organic-sounding slice of inspira-rock". Both songs were released on February 28, 2024.

On March 30, Guster sold pre-release CD copies of the album at the Boston date of their We Also Have Eras Tour at MGM Music Hall.

On January 24, 2025, Guster released Ooh La Luxe, an expanded version of the album featuring four new tracks, including two new songs, "It's Wild" and "Enchanté".

== Track listing ==
All lyrics are written by Ryan Miller; all music is composed by Miller, Adam Gardner, Brian Rosenworcel, and Luke Reynolds. "This Heart Is Occupied" and "The Elevator" composed with Josh Kaufman; "Keep Going" composed with Rob Kleiner.

Ooh La La track listing
No.	Title	Length
1.	"This Heart Is Occupied"	4:44
2.	"When We Were Stars"	4:38
3.	"All Day"	3:23
4.	"My Kind"	3:18
5.	"Keep Going"	4:08
6.	"Gauguin, Cézanne (Everlasting Love)"	4:04
7.	"Witness Tree"	3:02
8.	"Black Balloon"	2:58
9.	"The Elevator"	3:03
10.	"Maybe We're Alright"	3:48
Total length:		37:06

Ooh La Luxe deluxe edition bonus tracks
No.	Title	Length
11.	"It's Wild"	3:46
12.	"Enchanté"	2:39
13.	"It's Wild (Demo)"	4:41
14.	"The Elevator (Demo)"	1:31
Total length:		49:43

== Personnel ==
- Josh Kaufman – producer
- Adam Ayan – mastering
- Daniel James Goodwin – mixing (track 1), engineering (tracks 1, 4–10)
- Rich Costey – mixing, engineering (tracks 2, 3)
- Peter Katis – mixing (tracks 4–10)
- Jeff Citron – engineering (tracks 2, 3)
