= Satellite (disambiguation) =

A satellite is an artificial object which has been intentionally placed into orbit.

Satellite or satellites may also refer to:

== Astronomy ==
- Natural satellite, an orbiting object not man-made and not in direct orbit around the Sun or another star; a moon
- Satellite planet, a planetary-mass moon
- Satellite galaxy, a galaxy that orbits another

== Biology ==
- Satellite (biology), a sub-viral agent
- Satellite (moth), a species of moth
- Satellite DNA
  - Minisatellite
  - Microsatellite
- Satellite chromosome, a chromosome structure

== Communication ==
- Communications satellite
- Satellite television, television service provided over Earth-orbiting satellites
- Satellite phone
- Satellite radio, radio service provided over Earth-orbiting satellites
- Satellite Internet access, Internet service provided over Earth-orbiting satellites
- High-altitude platform station, or atmospheric satellite, a long endurance, high altitude aircraft

== Places ==
=== Types of place ===
- Satellite state, a dependent country
- Satellite city, a smaller, self-contained city within a larger city's metro area
- Commuter town, a residential town within commuting range of a large city
- Satellite campus, which is physically detached from the main campus

=== Named places ===
- Satellite Island (Tasmania), Australia
- Satellite Island (Washington), U.S.
- The Satellite (Antarctica), a small rock peak in Antarctica

== Music ==
=== Groups and labels ===
- Les Satellites, a French alternative rock band
- Satellite (Polish band), a progressive rock band
- Satellite (American band), an alternative rock band
- Satellite (Australian band), a hard rock band
- Satellite Records (1957–1960), now Stax Records
- Satellites, a musical project of John Garrison

=== Albums ===
- Satellite (P.O.D. album), and the title song, 2001
- Satellite (Panic Room album), and the title song, 2010
- Satellite (The Player Piano album), 2007
- Satellite EP, and the title song, by Guster, 2007
- Satellite, by Sam Paganini, 2014
- Satellite, by Stephen Ashbrook, 1995
- Satellites (The Big Dish album), 1991
- Satellites (The Script album), 2024
- Satellites (Celldweller album), 2022

=== Songs ===
- "Satellite" (Bebe Rexha and Snoop Dogg song), 2023
- "Satellite" (The Beloved song), 1996
- "Satellite" (Dave Matthews Band song), 1994
- "Satellite" (Guster song), 2006
- "Satellite" (Harry Styles song), 2022
- "Satellite" (The Hooters song), 1987
- "Satellite" (Lena Meyer-Landrut song), 2010; also recorded by Jennifer Braun, 2010
- "Satellite" (P.O.D. song), 2001
- "Satellite" (Rise Against song), 2011
- "Satellite" (Starset song), 2017
- "Satellit" by Ted Gärdestad, 1979
- "Satellites" (song), by September, 2005
- "Satellite", by Aimee Mann from Bachelor No. 2 or, the Last Remains of the Dodo, 2000
- "Satellite", by All Time Low from Future Hearts, 2015
- "Satellite", by Anna Nalick from Wreck of the Day, 2005
- "Satellite", by Axle Whitehead from Losing Sleep, 2008
- "Satellite", by Bae Suzy, 2022
- "Satellite", by BT from Movement in Still Life, 1999
- "Satellite", by Catherine Wheel from Adam and Eve, 1997
- "Satellite", by Collective Soul from Youth, 2004
- "Satellite", by Def Leppard from On Through the Night, 1980
- "Satellite", by Depeche Mode from A Broken Frame, 1982
- "Satellite", by Elliott Smith from Elliott Smith, 1995
- "Satellite", by Elton John from Ice on Fire, 1985
- "Satellite", by Elvis Costello from Spike, 1989
- "Satellite", by Gabbie Hanna, 2017
- "Satellite", by Icehouse from Big Wheel, 1993
- "Satellite", by Joe Jackson from Fast Forward, 2015
- "Satellite", by Joey Badass from Summer Knights, 2013
- "Satellite", by John Coltrane from Coltrane's Sound, 1964
- "Satellite", by the Kills from Blood Pressures, 2011
- "Satellite", by Little Boots from Nocturnes, 2013
- "Satellite", by Loona from [+ +], 2019
- "Satellite", by Maggie Rogers from Notes from the Archive: Recordings 2011-2016, 2020
- "Satellite", by Mayday Parades from Sunnyland, 2018
- "Satellite", by Natalie Imbruglia from White Lilies Island, 2001
- "Satellite", by Nickelback from No Fixed Address, 2014
- "Satellite", by Nine Inch Nails from Hesitation Marks, 2013
- "Satellite", by OceanLab, 2004
- "Satellite", by Orchestral Manoeuvres in the Dark, a B-side of the single "Dreaming", 1988
- "Satellite", by Rebecca Black, 2018
- "Satellite", by Richard Wright from Broken China, 1996
- "Satellite", by the Sex Pistols, B-side of the single "Holidays in the Sun", 1977
- "Satellite", by Smash Mouth from Astro Lounge, 1999
- "Satellite", by TV on the Radio from Young Liars, 2003
- "Satellite", by the Wanted from The Wanted, 2012
- "Satellite", by Yo La Tengo from May I Sing with Me, 1992
- "Satellites", by Beyoncé from I Am... Sasha Fierce, 2008
- "Satellites", by Cherry Monroe, 2005
- "Satellites", by the Cinema from My Blood Is Full of Airplanes, 2011
- "Satellites (Act III)", by Crown the Empire from The Resistance: Rise of The Runaways, 2014
- "Satellites", by Don Diablo from Future, 2018
- "Satellites", by Doves from The Last Broadcast, 2002
- "Satellites", by Enter Shikari from Nothing Is True & Everything Is Possible, 2020
- "Satellites", by James Blunt from Moon Landing, 2013
- "Satellites", by Mew from + -, 2015
- "Satellites", by Periphery from Periphery IV: Hail Stan, 2019
- "Satellites", by Ravyn Lenae from Hypnos, 2022
- "Satellites", by Rickie Lee Jones from Flying Cowboys, 1989
- "Satellites", by Sleeping with Sirens from Feel, 2013
- "Satelllliiiiiiiteee", by Flying Lotus from Cosmogramma, 2010
- "Satellites", by The Script, from the album of the same name, 2024

== Other uses ==
- Satellite airfield
- Satellite terminal
- Satellite tornado, a smaller tornado that orbits around a larger "parent" tornado
- Satellite (software), an open source system management system developed by Red Hat
- NES Satellite, a Nintendo Entertainment System accessory
- Plymouth Satellite, any of several car models built by Plymouth in the 1960s and early 1970s
- Toshiba Satellite, a product line of notebook computers
- Satellite, the name for the old Domino City in the anime Yu-Gi-Oh! 5D's
- Satellite portfolio, an investment strategy; see Core & Satellite
- Satellite tournament, a minor tournament or event on a competitive sporting tour
- Client software Satellite of defunct peer-to-peer file-sharing system Audiogalaxy (1998-2002)

== See also ==
- Ciudad Satélite, in Naucalpan, Mexico
- Sattalites, a Canadian reggae group
- Satelight, an animation studio in Japan
- Satelit, a neighborhood of the Serbian city of Novi Sad
