= Keep It Together (album) =

2003 album by Guster

Studio album by Guster
- Released: June 24, 2003
- Recorded: 2001–2003
- Genre: Alternative rock
- Length: 48:44
- Label: Palm, Reprise
- Producer: Roger Moutenot and Ron Aniello

Guster chronology
Lost and Gone Forever (1999)	Keep It Together (2003)	Ganging Up on the Sun (2006)

Professional ratings
Review scores
Source	Rating
AllMusic	4/5 stars
Pitchfork Media	3.5/5 stars
Rolling Stone	3/5 stars
Drowned in Sound	8/10

Keep It Together is the fourth studio album by the band Guster, released in June 2003. The album was recorded from 2001 to 2003 in Bearsville, New York, New York City, Burbank, California, and Shokan, New York. This is the first album by Guster with Brian Rosenworcel on kit drums instead of hand percussion. Keep It Together went through several working titles, including Bitch Magic, Olympia Dukakis and Come Downstairs & Say Hello.

According to the album's liner notes, Joe Pisapia contributed guest vocals on "Jesus on the Radio" and Ben Kweller did the same on "I Hope Tomorrow Is Like Today". Pisapia officially joined the band in 2003.

The track "Red Oyster Cult" refers to the name of the American rock band Blue Öyster Cult.

A UK re-release included two bonus tracks, "Say That to My Face" and "Starless Heaven".

The record sold 267,000 copies by late 2005, according to Nielsen Soundscan.

== Track listing ==
All music is composed by Guster, except where noted.

No.	Title	Lyrics	Music	Length
1.	"Diane"	Ryan Miller		3:46
2.	"Careful"	Miller		3:42
3.	"Amsterdam"	Brian Rosenworcel	Guster; Tony Goddess; Ron Aniello	3:37
4.	"Backyard"	Miller		2:55
5.	"Homecoming King"	Rosenworcel		3:37
6.	"Ramona"	Miller		3:06
7.	"Jesus on the Radio"	Miller; Joe Pisapia	Miller; Pisapia	2:17
8.	"Keep It Together"	Rosenworcel	Guster; Aniello	3:43
9.	"Come Downstairs and Say Hello"	Miller		5:16
10.	"Red Oyster Cult"	Rosenworcel		3:27
11.	"Long Way Down"	Miller		4:34
12.	"I Hope Tomorrow Is Like Today"	Miller; Ben Kweller	Guster; Kweller	3:22
13.	"Silence"			0:30
14.	"Two at a Time" (hidden track)	Miller		4:57

Guster performing an "unplugged" version of "Jesus on the Radio" at a concert at Ohio State University in 2006

When the band plays "Jesus on the Radio" live, they often play it "unplugged", without any instruments or microphones plugged in.

"Keep It Together" can be heard at the end of the season 1 The O.C. episode, "The Rescue".

"I Hope Tomorrow Is Like Today" can be heard in the film Wedding Crashers and in the Malcolm in the Middle episode "Lois' Sister".

== Personnel ==
Guster

- Ryan Miller – vocals, bass guitar, guitar, keyboards, Mellotron
- Adam Gardner – vocals, guitar, banjo, piano
- Brian Rosenworcel – drums, percussion, bongos, keyboards, guitar, backing vocals

Guest musicians

- Ron Aniello – guitar, Mellotron, banjo
- David Henry – cello
- Jim Hoke – brass, woodwind
- Ben Kweller – guitar, piano, vocals
- Jacob Lawson – violin
- Randy Leago – brass, woodwind
- Brandon Mason – trumpet
- Roger Moutenot – Jew's harp
- Joe Pisapia – banjo, vocals
- Neil Rosengarden – flugelhorn

"Backyard" guest musicians Every guest musician on Keep It Together was forced to record a take on the song "Backyard". The rule was they could only record one take, and they must have no knowledge of the song before they began recording.

- Ron Aniello – additional instruments
- David Henry – upright bass
- Jim Hoke – harmonica
- Ben Kweller – "frightening double-necked string instrument"
- Jacob Lawson – additional instruments
- Randy Leago – additional instruments
- Brandon Mason – additional instruments
- Roger Moutenot – Moog synthesizer
- Joe Pisapia – banjo
- Neil Rosengarden – additional instruments
- Josh Rouse – backing vocals

== Charts ==
Chart (2003)	Peak position
US Billboard 200	35

== The Meowstro Sings — Guster's Keep It Together ==
The Meowstro Sings — Guster's Keep It Together

Remix album by Guster
- Released: 2003
- Recorded: 2001–2003
- Genre: Comedy rock
- Length: 44:06
- Label: Palm/Reprise
- Producer: Roger Moutenot and Ron Aniello

The Meowstro Sings — Guster's Keep It Together features all but one of the tracks from Keep It Together, with the vocals replaced by simulated cat meows. According to the band, the meows were sung by Guster's monitor engineer at the time, Matt Peskie. The tracks were then released online, in an effort to deter downloading of legitimate tracks. The "meow mixes" gained a following from some fans, and were made available to Keep It Together purchasers through a link hidden on that album.

The Meowstro is featured in "Melanie", which appeared on the 2004 Guster album Live 6/17/04 Myrtle Beach, SC. The studio version of "Melanie" appears on Goldfly also includes some meowing, but not by the Meowstro. Guster released the single "Carol of the Meows" for the 2004 holiday season, a recording of the traditional "Carol of the Bells" given the same treatment.

Track listing

1. "Diane" (Meow Mix) – 3:51
2. "Amsterdam" (Meow Mix) – 3:39
3. "Homecoming King" (Meow Mix) – 3:43
4. "Jesus on the Radio" (Meow Mix) – 2:22
5. "Come Downstairs and Say Hello" (Meow Mix) – 5:24
6. "Keep It Together" (Meow Mix) – 3:43
7. "Long Way Down" (Meow Mix) – 4:42
8. "Backyard" (Meow Mix) – 3:07
9. "Red Oyster Cult" (Meow Mix) – 3:31
10. "Ramona" (Meow Mix) – 3:05
11. "Careful" (Meow Mix) – 3:44
12. "I Hope Tomorrow Is Like Today" (Meow Mix) – 3:20
