= Satellite EP =

EP by Guster
- Released: April 10, 2007
- Genre: Rock
- Label: Reprise
- Producer: Joe Pisapia, Jason Lehning

Guster chronology
Ganging Up on the Sun (2006)	Satellite EP (2007)	Easy Wonderful (2010)

Professional ratings
Review scores
Source	Rating
AllMusic	3.5/5 stars
Exclaim!	Positive
IGN	6.1

Satellite EP is the fifth EP by the rock band Guster. It was released on April 10, 2007. It is Guster's third EP with the musician Joe Pisapia.

The EP includes both live recordings and songs recorded during the creation of Ganging Up on the Sun but not included on the album.

The Astronauts, a producing team, remixed a techno-inspired version of "Satellite" that appears on this EP as well. This was first released as an iTunes single and a radio edit of this song received airplay on radio stations.

"Two of Us" is a Beatles song which the band covers on the EP.

"Total Eclipse of the Heart" is a somewhat less-than-serious cover of the original Bonnie Tyler song, recorded at a concert at the State Theater in Portland, Maine. Brian Rosenworcel, the band's drummer, sings the lead vocals, a rare occurrence in Guster's music.

Reverb, an environmental action group of the guitarist/vocalist Adam Gardner and his wife, helped to produce this EP as entirely carbon neutral. The CD sleeve indicates that it is printed using soy inks on paper certified as "sustainable by the Forest Stewardship Council".

The song "Satellite" is used in Menno Meyjes' 2007 movie Martian Child.

== Track listing ==
1. "Satellite"
2. "G Major"
3. "Rise & Shine"
4. "Timothy Leary"
5. "I'm Through"
6. "Satellite" (the Astronauts remix)
7. "Two of Us" (live at KCRW)
8. "Total Eclipse of the Heart" (live at the State Theatre)
