= Luke Reynolds =

American musician

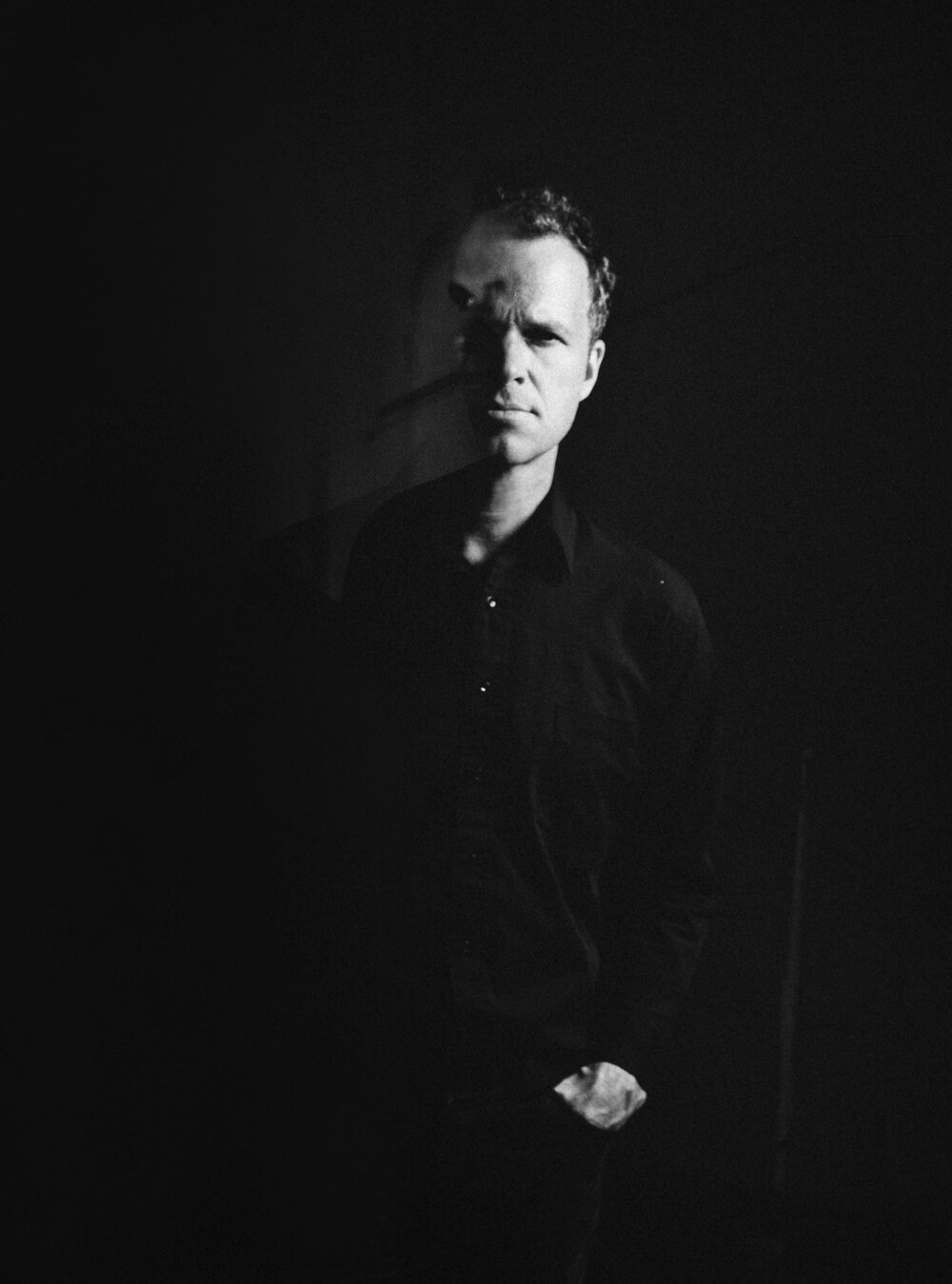

Background information
- Born: Lucas Fitzpatrick Reynolds; April 20, 1979 (age 47)
- Origin: Cornwall, Vermont, U.S.
- Genres: Pop, alternative, instrumental, field recordings
- Instruments: Vocals, guitar, keyboards, bass, pedal steel, programming, whistling
- Label: Domino Publishing
- Member of: Guster
- Website: http://lukereynoldsmusic.com/

Lucas Fitzpatrick Reynolds (born April 20, 1979) is an American guitarist and multi-instrumentalist, artist, writer and producer. He also plays the But Why theme song which comes from his song “no way to know what’s coming.”

== Career ==
=== Studio work ===
As a guitarist and multi-instrumentalist, he has worked with Sharon Van Etten, The Staves, Adrian Utley, Regina Spektor, Rick Rubin, Neko Case, Sarah Jarosz, Miranda Lambert, Guster, Phosphorescent, Rayland Baxter, and The War on Drugs. He is a frequent collaborator with producer John Congleton, and signed to Congleton's publishing company, Animal Rites Music / Domino Publishing.

=== Solo work ===
Reynolds has released seven solo albums—Vanishing Places Vol. 2 Glaciers In Iceland (2020), The Neighborhood (2019), Vanishing Places Vol. 1 Bears Ears (2019), After The Flood (2014), Maps (2010), Pictures And Sound (2008), and The Space Between the Lines (2006).

=== Early career ===
In 1999, Reynolds moved to Nashville to pursue music and attend Belmont University. In 2002, he co-founded the band Blue Merle who signed with Island Records and released one album - Burning in the Sun - produced by Stephen Harris. Following Blue Merle, Reynolds left Nashville and signed with Vanguard Records, releasing Pictures And Sound produced by Jacquire King, in August 2008.

=== Guster ===
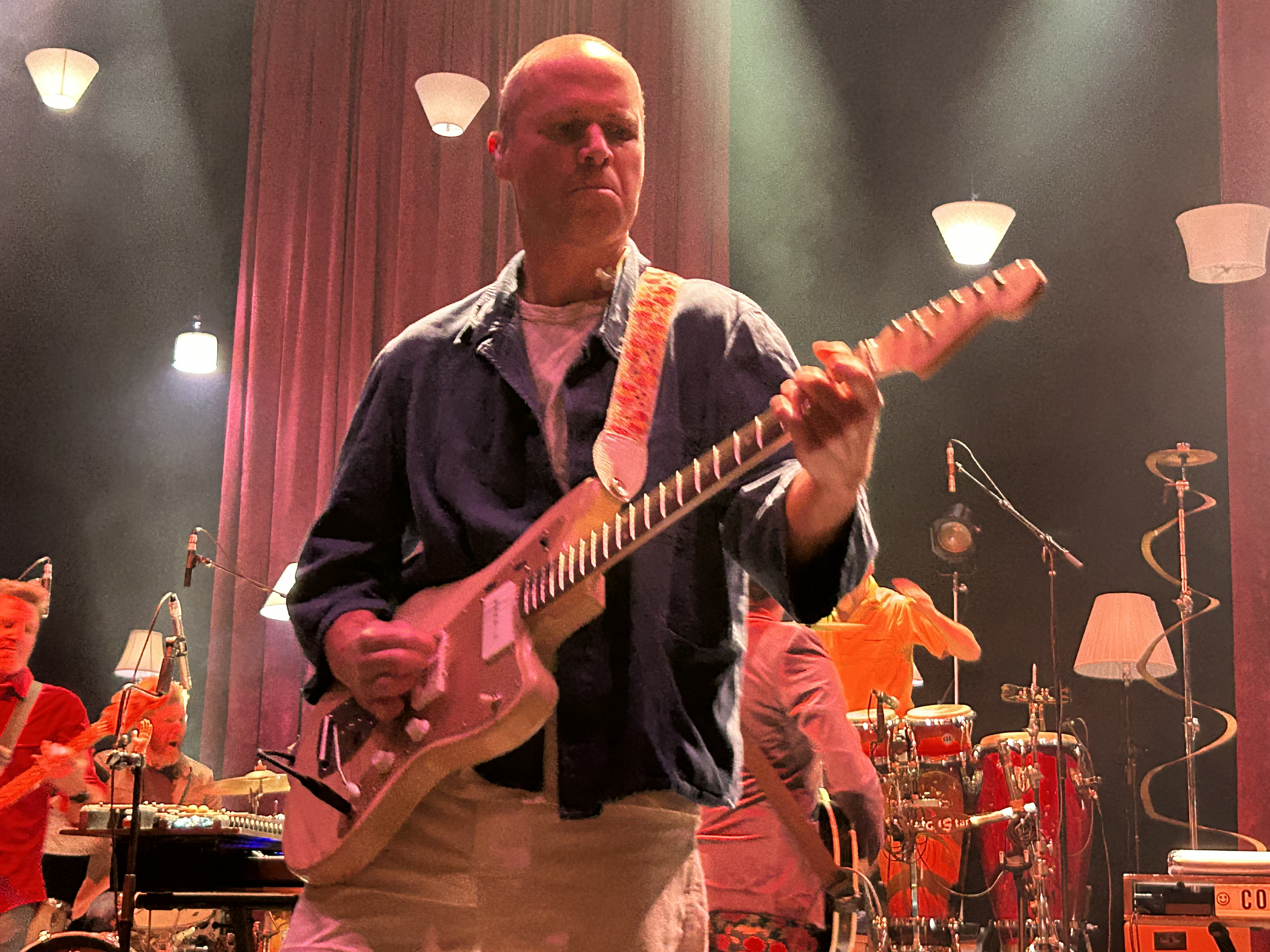
Luke Reynolds performs with Guster at The Capitol Theatre on April 8, 2023.

Before starting their 2010 fall tour, Guster announced that Joe Pisapia would not be touring with the band. Instead, Pisapia would be touring with k.d. lang with whom he had been writing songs. It was also announced that Luke Reynolds would be filling in for Joe starting September 12, 2010. In 2014 the band began recording Evermotion in Cottage Grove, Oregon. Evermotion was released on January 13, 2015, and was produced by Richard Swift. Most recently, Guster released their album Look Alive in January 2019, recorded with producers Leo Abrahams and John Congleton. This is the band's second album with Reynolds as a full member and co-writer, following their Richard Swift produced LP, Evermotion.

== Select discography ==
- 2023 Gag Orger / Kesha / (RCA)
- 2023 Phantomime EP / Ghost / (Loma Vista)
- 2022 Crybaby / Tegan and Sara / (Mom + Pop)
- 2022 Home, Before and After / Regina Spektor / (Sire/Warner)
- 2021 No End In Sight / Luke Reynolds and Adrian Utley / (Amazon Music)
- 2021 Good Woman / The Staves / (Nonesuch + Atlantic UK)
- 2021 Sunflower / Briston Maroney / (Canvasback Music)
- 2020 Vanishing Places Vol. 2 Glaciers In Iceland / Luke Reynolds
- 2019 The Neighborhood / Luke Reynolds
- 2019 Vanishing Places Vol. 1 Bears Ears / Luke Reynolds
- 2019 Remind Me Tomorrow / Sharon Van Etten / (Jagjaguwar)
- 2019 Look Alive / Guster / (Ocho Mule)
- 2018 C'est La Vie / Phosphorescent / (Dead Oceans)
- 2018 Hell-On / Neko Case / (Anti-)
- 2016 The Weight of These Wings / Miranda Lambert / (RCA)
- 2016 Undercurrent / Sarah Jarosz / (Sugar Hill)
- 2015 Imaginary Man / Rayland Baxter / (ATO)
- 2015 Evermotion / Guster / (Ocho Mule)
- 2014 After the Flood / Luke Reynolds
- 2013 Live Acoustic / Guster / (Ocho Mule)
- 2011 On the Ocean EP / Guster / (Ocho Mule)
- 2011 Loverboy / Brett Dennen / (Dualtone Records)
- 2011 Self Titled / The Belle Brigade / (Warner Bros)
- 2010 Maps / Luke Reynolds
- 2008 Pictures And Sound / Pictures And Sound / (Vanguard)
- 2006 Space Between the Lines EP / Luke Reynolds
- 2005 Live at Bull Moose / Blue Merle / (Island)
- 2005 Burning in the Sun / Blue Merle / (Island)
- 2004 The Fires EP / Blue Merle / (Island)
