= One Man Wrecking Machine =

Single by Guster

from the album Ganging Up on the Sun
- Released: March 24, 2006
- Recorded: 2005–06
- Genre: Rock; pop
- Length: 4:14
- Label: Reprise
- Songwriters: Adam Gardner, Ryan Miller and Brian Rosenworcel
- Producer: Ron Aniello

Guster singles chronology
"Homecoming King" (2004)	"One Man Wrecking Machine" (2006)	"Satellite" (2007)

Music video
- "One Man Wrecking Machine" on YouTube

"One Man Wrecking Machine" is the first single from Guster's fifth studio album, Ganging Up on the Sun. It became one of the band's most successful singles, peaking at No. 3 on the Adult Alternative Airplay chart, their second-highest-charting song along after "Careful". A music video directed and animated by Drew Lightfoot was produced for the release.

== Track listing ==
One Man Wrecking Machine - EP
No.	Title	Length
1.	"One Man Wrecking Machine"	4:14
2.	"Days" (Bonus Track)	2:54
3.	"Ruby Falls"	7:05
4.	"Two at a Time" (Demo Version)	4:19
5.	"Good Feeling" (Live)	3:38
Total length:		22:10

== Charts ==
Chart (2006)	Peak position
US Adult Alternative Airplay (Billboard)	3
