= Blue Merle =

American band

- Origin: Nashville, Tennessee, United States
- Genres: Folk, bluegrass, acoustic
- Years active: 2003 – 2006
- Label: Island
- Past members: Luke Reynolds; Jason Oettel; Beau Stapleton; William Ellis; Luke Bulla; Patrick Ross; Kevin Arrowsmith

Blue Merle was an American band centered in Nashville, Tennessee. Their name comes from the lyrics of a Led Zeppelin song, Bron-Y-Aur Stomp from Led Zeppelin III, referring to a "blue-eyed merle" border collie dog. The band was fronted by lead singer Luke Reynolds.

The band was first formed when Luke Reynolds and Jason Oettel met and began to work together. A friend in a studio offered them some recording time, and they began recording several demo tracks. While they were doing so, the President of Sony Publishing happened to be there, and offered them a contract. While they passed on it, it was a start. Reynolds then met Beau Stapleton, a Mandolin player, on his way back to his home in Vermont and invited him to join. Oettel brought one of his own friends, William Ellis, a drummer into the band as well. It was William who came up with the band's name. The last member to join was Luke Bulla, a fiddle player, who had been asked to fill in for a couple weeks, and soon was a full-time member.

In February 2005, Blue Merle released Burning In The Sun, which features the singles "Burning In The Sun", "Every Ship Must Sail Away", and "Lucky To Know You". The album hit #8 on the Billboard Heatseekers chart and peaked at #199 on the Billboard 200. Blue Merle played Lollapalooza in 2005, and toured with Guster, Jem, J.J. Cale, and Badly Drawn Boy.

In April 2006, the band broke up. They played their last show, 45 minute set, on Friday, April 21 at Vanderbilt University's Rites of Spring music festival along with Clap Your Hands Say Yeah and My Morning Jacket.

Since the band's breakup, Luke Reynolds released two solo EPs entitled The Space Between the Lines and Maps, before joining the band Guster full-time. Beau Stapleton also released a solo EP, Will I Shine For You Still.

Luke Reynolds's last project was named Pictures and Sound, and released their self-titled debut album August 19, 2008 on Vanguard Records.

In August 2008, NBC used Blue Merle's song "Burning in the Sun" during a feature on the Women's Pole Vault during the Beijing Olympics. The song "If I Could" was also prominently featured in the Friday Night Lights episode "Let's Get It On" (first aired Nov 2 2007). "Every Ship Must Sail Away" was the final song in Season 1, Episode 2 of the TV series "Bones".

== Discography ==
Studio albums

- Burning in the Sun (2005)

EPs

- Blue Merle (2003)
- Blue Merle The Fires (2004)
- Live at Bull Moose (2005)
