= Satellite (Guster song) =

Single by Guster

from the album Ganging Up on the Sun
- Released: 2007
- Genre: Indie rock
- Length: 4:34 (album version); 4:12 (video version); 3:52 (single version)
- Label: Reprise
- Songwriters: Adam Gardner, Ryan Miller, Joe Pisapia and Brian Rosenworcel
- Producers: Joe Pisapia, Jason Lehning

Guster singles chronology
"One Man Wrecking Machine" (2006)	"Satellite" (2007)	"Do You Love Me" (2010)

Satellite is the second single from Guster's 2006 album Ganging Up on the Sun. The song received support from U.S. alternative rock radio, but failed to chart on the Modern Rock Tracks chart. There was also a Satellite EP released April 10, 2007. The song is also featured in the 2007 film Martian Child. The stop motion video for the song, directed by Adam Bizanski, was released on February 2, 2007.

The single would go on to earn the band its first gold record in 2018.

== Charts ==
Chart (2006–07)	Peak position
US Adult Alternative Airplay (Billboard)	5

== Certifications ==
Certifications for "Satellite"
Region	Certification	Certified units/sales
United States (RIAA)	Gold	500,000^{‡}
^{^} Shipments figures based on certification alone.
