= Set Me Free (Jennifer Knapp album) =

Studio album by Jennifer Knapp
- Released: October 14, 2014
- Genre: Folk rock, pop rock
- Length: 40:39
- Language: English
- Label: Righteous Babe
- Producer: Jacob Lawson

Jennifer Knapp chronology
The Hymns of Christmas (2012)	Set Me Free (2014)	Love Comes Back Around (2017)

Set Me Free is a 2014 album by Jennifer Knapp, released on Righteous Babe Records. The folk rock album is the second full length released by Knapp after a public declaration that she is a lesbian and choosing to market her music outside of the Christian music industry. The album has received positive reviews.

== Production ==
She initially came out in 2010 and released Letting Go. The album was created at the same time as Knapp's memoir Facing the Music and the creation of the non-profit Inside Out Faith, which seeks to bridge the gap between sexual minorities and religious communities. The album includes semi-autobiographical material about Knapp's coming out as well as her life growing up in Kansas and some of the material written on the record dates back to 2007.

== Reception ==
The editorial staff of AllMusic gave the album a 3.5 out of five stars, with reviewer Timothy Monger calling the album "rustic [and] introspective", praising the diversity of the songwriting as "a mix of dark, introspective ballads awash with country and blues tones as well a couple of flat-out barnburners". Metro Weekly writer Chris Gerard compares the music favorably to Emmylou Harris, Sarah McLachlan, and Lucinda Williams, characterizing it as "an engaging collection of melodic folk-rock".

== Track listing ==
All songs written by Jennifer Knapp, except where noted

1. "Remedy" – 3:35
2. "Set Me Free" – 3:04
3. "Why Wait" – 3:13
4. "Neosho" – 3:37
5. "What Might Have Been" – 4:50
6. "Mercy's Tree" – 2:57
7. "The Tale" – 5:30
8. "So Happy" – 3:38
9. "The End" (Amy Courts and Knapp) – 2:44
10. "Sweet Love" (Anita Baker, Gary Anthony Bias, and Louis A. Johnson) – 3:11
11. "Come Back" – 4:20

== Personnel ==
Jennifer Knapp – vocals, guitar

Additional musicians

- Justin Cary – upright bass
- Amy Courts – backing vocals
- Thad DeBrock – guitar
- Jen Gunderman – organ, piano
- Robbie Hecht – backing vocals
- Micah Hulscher – Fender Rhodes, piano
- Lindsay Jamieson – drums, percussion
- Will Kimborough – guitar
- Shannon LaBrie – backing vocals
- Doug Lancio – guitar
- Jacob Lawson – production, string arrangements, violin
- Joe Pisapia – pedal steel guitar
- Lij Shaw – engineering

Technical personnel

- Amy Brown – mastering assistant
- Joe Costa – mixing
- Yvonne Costa – executive production
- Jim DeMain – mastering
- Betsy Frazer – design
- Fairlight Hubbard – photography
- Michelle Maloof – executive production
- Kara Wettersten – executive production
