= Parachute (Guster album) =

Studio album by Guster
- Released: April 1994
- Recorded: 1994
- Genre: Alternative rock
- Length: 43:33
- Label: Aware
- Producer: Mike Denneen

Guster chronology
Parachute (1994)	Goldfly (1997)

Parachute is the first album by the American band Guster, released in 1994. Four thousand copies were released under the band name Gus (the band had to change its name shortly afterward when another artist signed a record contract under that name). Those copies are considered very rare by Guster fans and are desired by them.

Originally released in April 1994, the album was produced by Mike Denneen and was re-released in November 14, 1995. The stuffed animal on the cover of the album is a childhood toy of the percussionist Brian Rosenworcel and is lovingly referred to as "The Big Friend". It has become a mascot of sorts for the band.

== Critical reception ==
Professional ratings
Review scores
Source	Rating
AllMusic	3/5 stars
The Encyclopedia of Popular Music	3/5 stars

The Boston Globe named the album the best local debut of 1994.

== Track listing ==
All tracks are written by Guster.

No.	Title	Length
1.	"Fall in Two"	3:16
2.	"Mona Lisa"	4:11
3.	"Love for Me"	3:28
4.	"Window"	3:35
5.	"Eden"	4:40
6.	"Scars & Stitches"	3:10
7.	"The Prize"	3:18
8.	"Dissolve"	5:23
9.	"Cocoon"	3:40
10.	"Happy Frappy"	3:41
11.	"Parachute"	5:13

== Personnel ==
Guster

- Adam Gardner – vocals, guitar
- Brian Rosenworcel – bongos, percussion
- Ryan Miller – vocals, guitar

Additional musicians

- Jay Bellerose – drums
- Mike Denneen – chamberlin
- Scott Davis
- Clayton Scoble – electric guitar, 12-string guitar
- Michael Rivard – upright bass
- Andy Custer – electric bass
- Dejan Kralj – guitar
- Goran Kralj – vocals, guitar, piano
- Jeff Murphy
- Milt Sutton
- Morgan Dawley
- Scott Schwebel – drums, percussion
- Steve Garrett – cello
- Tom Swafford – violin
- Wes Yoakam – vocals, guitar, keyboards
