= Sing It Loud (album) =

Studio album by k.d. lang and the Siss Boom Bang
- Released: April 1, 2011
- Genres: Folk, jazz, pop, country rock
- Length: 56:38 (Deluxe version)
- Label: Nonesuch
- Producers: k.d. lang, Joe Pisapia

k.d. lang chronology
Recollection (2010)	Sing It Loud (2011)	case/lang/veirs (2016)

Professional ratings
Aggregate scores
Source	Rating
Metacritic	(74/100)
Review scores
Source	Rating
AllMusic	4/5 stars
BBC Music	(favorable)
The Guardian	4/5 stars
The Independent	1/5 stars
Los Angeles Times	3.5/4 stars
Mojo	4/5 stars
MusicOMH	4/5 stars
Now	4/5 stars
Q	4/5 stars
Uncut	3/5 stars
The Washington Post	(favorable)

Sing It Loud is the thirteenth studio album by k.d. lang, credited to k.d. lang and the Siss Boom Bang, and was released on April 1, 2011.

== Track listing ==
All songs written by k.d. lang and Joe Pisapia unless otherwise noted.

1. "I Confess" (lang, Daniel Clarke, Joshua Grange) – 4:25
2. "A Sleep with No Dreaming" – 3:31
3. "The Water's Edge" – 3:53
4. "Perfect Word" – 4:41
5. "Sugar Buzz" – 5:14
6. "Sing It Loud" (Pisapia) – 5:25
7. "Inglewood" – 3:30
8. "Habit of Mind" (lang, Clarke, Grange) – 4:13
9. "Heaven" (David Byrne, Jerry Harrison) – 4:10
10. "Sorrow Nevermore" (lang, Clarke, Grange) – 3:33

14-track deluxe version exclusive to kdlang.com includes:

11. "Reminiscing" (Graeham Goble) – 3:45
12. "I Am the Winner" – 2:26
13. "Hollywood Kids" – 3:53
14. "Hungry Bird" – 4:42

== Release history ==
Region	Date	Label
Australia	April 1, 2011	WEA
United States	April 11, 2011	Nonesuch Records
Netherlands	April 15, 2011	Nonesuch Records / Warner Music
United Kingdom	April 18, 2011	Nonesuch Records

== Charts ==
=== Weekly charts ===
Chart (2011)	Peak position
Australian Albums (ARIA)	2
Canadian Albums Chart	7
New Zealand Albums (RMNZ)	28
UK Albums Chart	34
U.S. Billboard 200	32

=== Year-end charts ===
Chart (2011)	Position
Australian Albums Chart	61

== Certifications ==
Region	Certification	Certified units/sales
Australia (ARIA)	Gold	35,000^{^}
^{^} Shipments figures based on certification alone.
