= Ganging Up on the Sun =

Album by Guster

Studio album by Guster
- Released: June 20, 2006
- Genre: Alternative rock
- Length: 48:55
- Label: Reprise
- Producers: Joe Pisapia, Jason Lehning, Ron Aniello

Guster chronology
| Keep It Together (2003) | Ganging Up on the Sun (2006) | Easy Wonderful (2010) |

Professional ratings
Review scores
| Source | Rating |
|---|---|
| AllMusic | 4/5 stars |
| The A.V. Club | 3/4 stars |
| MusicOMH | 3/5 stars |
| New York Times | 4/5 stars |

Ganging Up on the Sun is the fifth studio album by the rock band Guster. It was released on June 20, 2006. The first single, "One Man Wrecking Machine", was released in late 2005 and its follow-up, "Satellite", in March 2006. It is Guster's second studio album with Joe Pisapia, his first as a full member. The title comes from a line in the song "Manifest Destiny": "The moon and stars are ganging up on the sun".

The album is Guster's most successful release to date, entering the Billboard 200 albums chart at number 25, topping Keep It Together's entry at number 35 in 2003. It won Album of the Year (Major) at the Boston Music Awards in 2006.

On May 5, 2021, the band announced a digital re-release of the album in an expanded form, with 24 tracks. This coincided with "Emily Ivory" being released for the first time, 15 years after it was teased in the studio documentary Joe's Place. The expanded edition of the album includes "Emily Ivory", four b-sides previously released on Satellite EP, "Sorority Tears" and "On My Own", both of which were unofficially released on The Pasty Tapes, two cover songs, two demos, and a remix.

== Legacy ==
In celebrating the 20th anniversary of the album's release, Guster performed the album in full at Guster at On The Ocean 2026 in Portland, Maine.

On social media, the band posted to acknowledge the anniversary revealing Warner Brothers rejected the album ahead of release.

== Track listing ==
| No. | Title | Length |
|---|---|---|
| 1. | "Lightning Rod" | 2:55 |
| 2. | "Satellite" | 4:34 |
| 3. | "Manifest Destiny" | 3:02 |
| 4. | "One Man Wrecking Machine" | 4:14 |
| 5. | "The Captain" | 3:26 |
| 6. | "The New Underground" | 2:52 |
| 7. | "Ruby Falls" | 7:04 |
| 8. | "C’mon" | 3:51 |
| 9. | "Empire State" | 4:59 |
| 10. | "Dear Valentine" | 4:34 |
| 11. | "The Beginning of the End" | 2:52 |
| 12. | "Hang On" | 4:32 |

== Charts ==
| Chart (2006) | Peak position |
|---|---|
| US Top Rock Albums (Billboard) | 8 |
| US Billboard 200 | 25 |
