= Careful (Guster song) =

Single by Guster

from the album Keep It Together
- Released: November 7, 2003
- Recorded: 2001–03
- Genre: Pop rock; alternative rock; soft rock
- Length: 3:43
- Label: Palm, Reprise
- Songwriter(s): Adam Gardner, Ryan Miller and Brian Rosenworcel
- Producer(s): Ron Aniello

Guster singles chronology
"Amsterdam" (2003)	"Careful" (2003)	"Keep It Together" (2004)

Music video
- "Careful" on YouTube

Careful is the second single from Guster’s fourth studio album, Keep It Together. The song is one of Guster’s most popular singles, and received significant play on MTV.

== Charts ==
Chart (2003–04)	Peak position
US Adult Alternative Songs (Billboard)	3
US Adult Pop Airplay (Billboard)	30
