= Lay It Down (Jennifer Knapp album) =

Studio album by Jennifer Knapp
- Released: February 29, 2000
- Studio: Castle Studios; Dark Horse Studios
- Genre: CCM; folk; Christian rock
- Length: 35:59
- Label: Gotee
- Producer: Mark Stuart; Jennifer Knapp

Jennifer Knapp chronology
Kansas (1998)	Lay It Down (2000)	The Way I Am (2001)

Professional ratings
Review scores
Source	Rating
AllMusic	4.5/5 stars
Jesus Freak Hideout	4.5/5 stars
Cross Rhythms	10/10 squares

Lay It Down is the second studio album by Contemporary Christian musician Jennifer Knapp. It was released on February 29, 2000, by Gotee Records. The album was nominated for "Best Rock Gospel Album" at the 43rd Grammy Awards in 2001. It peaked at No. 1 on Billboard's Top Christian Albums chart on March 17, 2000 and No. 77 on the Billboard 200 chart.

== Critical reception ==
Writing for AllMusic, Steve Losey comments, "On her second release Lay It Down, Knapp shows the kind of artistic growth expected from a seasoned veteran. One minute it's Carole King in a coffe shop courtesy of 'A Little More,' The next you're tapping your toe to a snappy Sheryl Crow vibe on 'Lay It Down.' This disc is rich in texture and lyrically passionate."

Ryan B Key reviews the album for Jesus Freak Hideout and gives it 4½ out of a possible 5 stars. He writes, "Lay it Down is an album that showcases the true meaning of Christian rock music and some of Knapp's best songwriting to date." He concludes his review by saying, "Lay it Down is an excellent album featuring some of the best songwriting available, Christian or secular."

Paul Nicholls of Cross Rhythms gives this album a 10 out of a possible 10 and concludes his review with, "My verdict? Excellent, well worth a play and a privilege to listen to."

== Track listing ==
All tracks are written by Jennifer Knapp, except "Diamond In the Rough", written by Shawn Colvin and John Leventhal.

No.	Title	Length
1.	"A Little More"	3:26
2.	"Lay It Down"	3:48
3.	"Usher Me Down"	3:27
4.	"Into You"	3:04
5.	"All Consuming Fire"	3:38
6.	"You Answer Me"	3:55
7.	"You Remain"	3:13
8.	"Diamond In the Rough"	4:03
9.	"When Nothing Satisfies" (with Margaret Becker)	3:41
10.	"Peace"	3:44
Total length:		35:59

== Musicians ==
- Jennifer Knapp – vocals, acoustic guitar (1–3, 7, 8, 10), electric guitar (6)
- David Alan – Hammond B3 organ (4, 6), Wurlitzer electric piano (5)
- Larry Hall – melodica (7)
- George Coccini – electric guitar (1), acoustic guitar (1)
- Mark Townsend– electric guitar (1), acoustic guitar (1, 5, 7–9)
- Tyler Burkum – electric guitars (2–4, 6), baritone guitar (3)
- Chris Thile – mandolin (8, 9)
- Tony Lucido – bass (1–8)
- Greg Herrington – drums (1–4, 6, 8, 9), programming (4, 8), percussion (7)
- Todd Collins – drum programming (5)
- Javier Solis – percussion (1, 4, 6–8)
- Mark Stuart – percussion (2)
- Margaret Becker – backing vocals and arrangements (9)

Nashville String Machine (Tracks 1 & 6)

- Tom Howard – arrangements and conductor (1, 6)
- Carl Gorodetzky – contractor
- Pamela Sixfin – string leader
- John Catchings and Bob Mason – cello
- Jack Jezioro – double bass
- Jim Grosjean, Gary Vanosdale and Kristen Wilkinson – viola
- David Angell, David Davidson, Gerald Greer, Alan Umstead, Catherine Umstead, Mary Kathryn Vanosdale and Karen Winkelmann – violin

== Production ==
- Toby McKeehan – executive producer
- Mark Stuart – producer
- Jennifer Knapp – producer
- Mike McGlaflin – A&R
- Brad Talbott – design
- Kerri McKeehan-Stuart – photography
- Steven Thomas – management
- Recorded at Castle Studios (Nashville, Tennessee) and Dark Horse Studios (Franklin, Tennessee).
- Mixed at The Sound Kitchen (Nashville, Tennessee)

Track information and credits verified from the album's liner notes.

== Charts ==
Chart (2000)	Peak position
US Billboard 200	77
US Top Christian Albums (Billboard)	1
