= The Way I Am (Jennifer Knapp album) =

Studio album by Jennifer Knapp
- Released: November 20, 2001
- Genre: Christian rock; folk rock
- Length: 50:33
- Label: Gotee
- Producer: Tony McAnany

Jennifer Knapp chronology
Lay It Down (2000)	The Way I Am (2001)	Jennifer Knapp Live (2006)

Professional ratings
Review scores
Source	Rating
AllMusic	4/5 stars
Cross Rhythms	10/10 squares
Jesus Freak Hideout	4.5/5 stars

The Way I Am is the third studio album from folk rock musician Jennifer Knapp, her fifth album overall and her final Christian rock album to date. It was released on November 20, 2001, through Gotee Records.

== Critical reception ==
Ashleigh Kittle of AllMusic concludes her review by writing, "In the end, with this release Knapp has yet to disappoint. She only serves to build and further shape the gift and talent demonstrated on her debut release, Kansas."

Mike Rimmer of Cross Rhythms gives this album 10 out of a possible 10 and remarks, "this is definitely a grower not a grabber and it took a number of listens before its intricate wonders revealed themselves to me!" He finishes the review by saying, "Just check out the 3am sound of "Around Me" which features understated jazzy guitar and Jennifer's vocals and plenty of vibe. Just fabulous! But then so is the whole album."

John DiBiase of Jesus Freak Hideout gives the album 4½ out of a possible 5 stars and concludes his review with, "The Way I Am is a solid album with more than you'd expect from even someone as talented as Jennifer Knapp. It tugs at your emotions and may surprise you how often it seems like Jennifer shares your same thoughts and feelings."

== Track listing ==
All tracks are written by Jennifer Knapp.

Album release
No.	Title	Length
1.	"By and By"	3:44
2.	"Breathe on Me"	3:29
3.	"The Way I Am"	4:05
4.	"Say Won't You Say"	3:58
5.	"Around Me"	3:39
6.	"Come to Me"	3:35
7.	"Charity"	4:57
8.	"Fall Down"	4:16
9.	"Sing Mary Sing"	4:11
10.	"In Two (The Lament)"	3:38
11.	"Light of the World" (featuring tobyMac)	5:44
12.	"No Regrets"	5:11
Total length:		50:27

== Musicians ==
- Jennifer Knapp – vocals, guitar, arrangements (2, 5, 8, 9, 10)
- David Hentschel – keyboards (1–4, 6–9, 11), programming (1–4, 6–9, 11), drum programming (1–4, 6–9, 11), arrangements (1, 3, 4, 6, 7, 11), string arrangements (2, 6, 10)
- Tony McAnany – additional arrangements (1), keyboards (2, 3, 6, 11), drum programming (2–4, 6, 11), arrangements (3, 6, 7, 11), spoken word (11)
- Nick Moroch – acoustic guitars (1–4, 6–9, 11), electric guitars (1–4, 6–9, 11), electric bass (2, 3, 11), guitar solo (6), Fender Telecaster solo (9)
- Tony Levin – bass (1, 6–9, 11), basses (2)
- Vinnie Colaiuta – drums (1–9, 11)
- Bashiri Johnson – percussion (3)
- Gavyn Wright – concertmaster (1–3, 6–9, 11, 12)
- London Symphony Orchestra– strings (1–3, 6–9, 11, 12)
- Nigel Black – French horn (10)
- Philip Eastop – French horn (10)
- David Daniels – cello (10)
- Tony Pleeth – cello (10), cello solo (12)
- David Theodore – oboe (12)
- Jeremy Lubbock – arrangements (12)
- Morgan Ames – music copyist (12)
- Emmett Estren – music copyist (12)
- Steven Juliani – music copyist (12)
- Jim Boggia – backing vocals (4, 7, 11)
- TobyMac – spoken word (11)

The Symphony of Voices on "Light of The World"

- Jim Boggia, Knowdaverbs (Michael Boyer II), Coffee (Stacy Jones), Kia Jones, TobyMac and Steve Thomas
- Tony McAnany – vocal arrangements

== Production ==
- Toby McKeehan – executive producer
- Joey Elwood – executive producer
- Tony McAnany – producer
- Roy Hendrickson – recording, mixing
- Steve Price – string recording (1–3, 6–12)
- Scott Hull – mastering at Classic Sound (New York City, New York)
- Mike McGlaflin – A&R direction
- Ben Pearson – photography
- Jen Reardon – sunset photography
- Aaron Marrs – creative design, layout design
- Eddy Boer – creative director

Track information and credits adapted from the album's liner notes.

== Charts ==
Chart (2001)	Peak position
US Top Christian Albums (Billboard)	10
US Billboard 200	130
