= Kansas (Jennifer Knapp album) =

Studio album by Jennifer Knapp
- Released: March 16, 1998
- Genre: Folk rock; pop; Christian rock; contemporary Christian music
- Length: 43:09
- Label: Gotee/Word
- Producer: Mark Stuart

Jennifer Knapp chronology
Wishing Well (1996)	Kansas (1998)	Lay It Down (2000)

Professional ratings
Review scores
Source	Rating
AllMusic	4.5/5 stars
Cross Rhythms (Original Release)	9/10 squares
Jesus Freak Hideout	4.5/5 stars
Cross Rhythms (Gold Ed.)	10/10 squares

Kansas is the first major label studio album by Christian folk rock musician Jennifer Knapp. It was released in 1998 on Gotee Records. The album went on to sell 500,000 copies in the U.S., and was certified Gold.

On February 26, 2008, an expanded 10th Anniversary Gold Edition of Kansas was released, which included five live tracks, a song ("Jesus Loves Me") from Knapp's 1996 independent album, with "Undo Me" and "Whole Again" remastered.

== Critical reception ==
Ashleigh Kittle of AllMusic writes, "Kansas, the first Gotee Records release from singer/songwriter Jennifer Knapp, is an album rarely paralleled in the gospel genre. The edgy yet vulnerable folk-rock and alternative CCM mix serve to create a guitar-driven, almost gritty sound, resulting in comparisons between Knapp and fellow Lilith Fair performers Sheryl Crow and Melissa Etheridge."

Peter Bate of Cross Rhythms gives the original release 9 out of a possible 10 and writes, "one listen through Kansas, which highlights the exceptional talents of the young singer/songwriter, stopped me in my tracks. As well as possessing an achingly expressive voice, Jennifer's poetic lyrics have a heart-stopping intensity and depth."

Sarah Fine of Jesus Freak Hideout gives the album 4½ out of a possible 5 stars and writes, "It is no accident that this album was named one of the best." and concludes her review with, "It offers a message that was not only relevant 10 years ago, but a message that is still very much relevant today and tomorrow as well."

Ato Erzan-Essien of Cross Rhythms reviews the 10th Anniversary Gold Edition of Kansas and gives it 10 out of a possible 10 while saying, "The 10 years that have passed since the original album's release have been kind, and the strong songwriting and simple instrumentation have not dated."

== Track listing ==
All tracks are written by Jennifer Knapp, except "Refine Me" by Kim Bontrager.

No.	Title	Length
1.	"Prelude (Faithful To Me)"	1:08
2.	"Whole Again"	3:44
3.	"Undo Me"	3:24
4.	"Trinity"	4:30
5.	"In The Name"	3:53
6.	"His Grace Is Sufficient"	3:54
7.	"Martyrs & Thieves"	5:55
8.	"Romans"	3:08
9.	"Refine Me"	3:29
10.	"Hold Me Now"	4:09
11.	"Visions"	4:19
12.	"Faithful To Me (Reprise)"	1:36
Total length:		43:09

10th Anniversary Gold Edition
No.	Title	Length
13.	"Jesus Loves Me (Wishing Well Version)" (original version written by Anna Bartlett Warner and William Batchelder Bradbury)	3:54
14.	"Whole Again" (Acoustic)	3:41
15.	"Romans" (Live)	3:10
16.	"Trinity" (Live)	6:29
17.	"Hold Me Now" (Live)	4:20
18.	"Refine Me" (Live)	4:14
19.	"Undo Me" (Live)	6:57
Total length:		75:54

== Charts ==
Chart (1988)	Peak position
US Top Christian Albums (Billboard)	11
US Heatseekers Albums (Billboard)	21

== Certifications ==
Region	Certification	Certified units/sales
United States (RIAA)	Gold	500,000^{^}
^{^} Shipments figures based on certification alone.
