= Amsterdam (Guster song) =

Single by Guster

from the album Keep It Together
- Released: May 19, 2003
- Recorded: 2001–03
- Genre: Pop rock; alternative rock
- Length: 3:37
- Label: Palm, Reprise
- Songwriters: Adam Gardner, Ryan Miller, Brian Rosenworcel, Tony Goddess, Ron Aniello
- Producer: Ron Aniello

Guster singles chronology
"Happier" (2000)	"Amsterdam" (2003)	"Careful" (2003)

Music video
- "Amsterdam" on YouTube

"Amsterdam", also stylized as "Amsterdam (Gonna Write You A Letter)", is the first single from Guster's fourth studio album, Keep It Together. The song is Guster's most successful single, peaking at number one on the Billboard Adult Alternative Airplay chart for four weeks in August 2003.

== Track listing ==
CD single track list
No.	Title	Length
1.	"Amsterdam (Gonna Write You A Letter) (Album Version)"
2.	"Call-out Research Hook #1"
3.	"Call-out Research Hook #2"

== Charts ==
Chart (2003)	Peak position
US Adult Alternative Airplay (Billboard)	1
US Adult Pop Airplay (Billboard)	20
