= Jennifer Knapp =

American-Australian musician

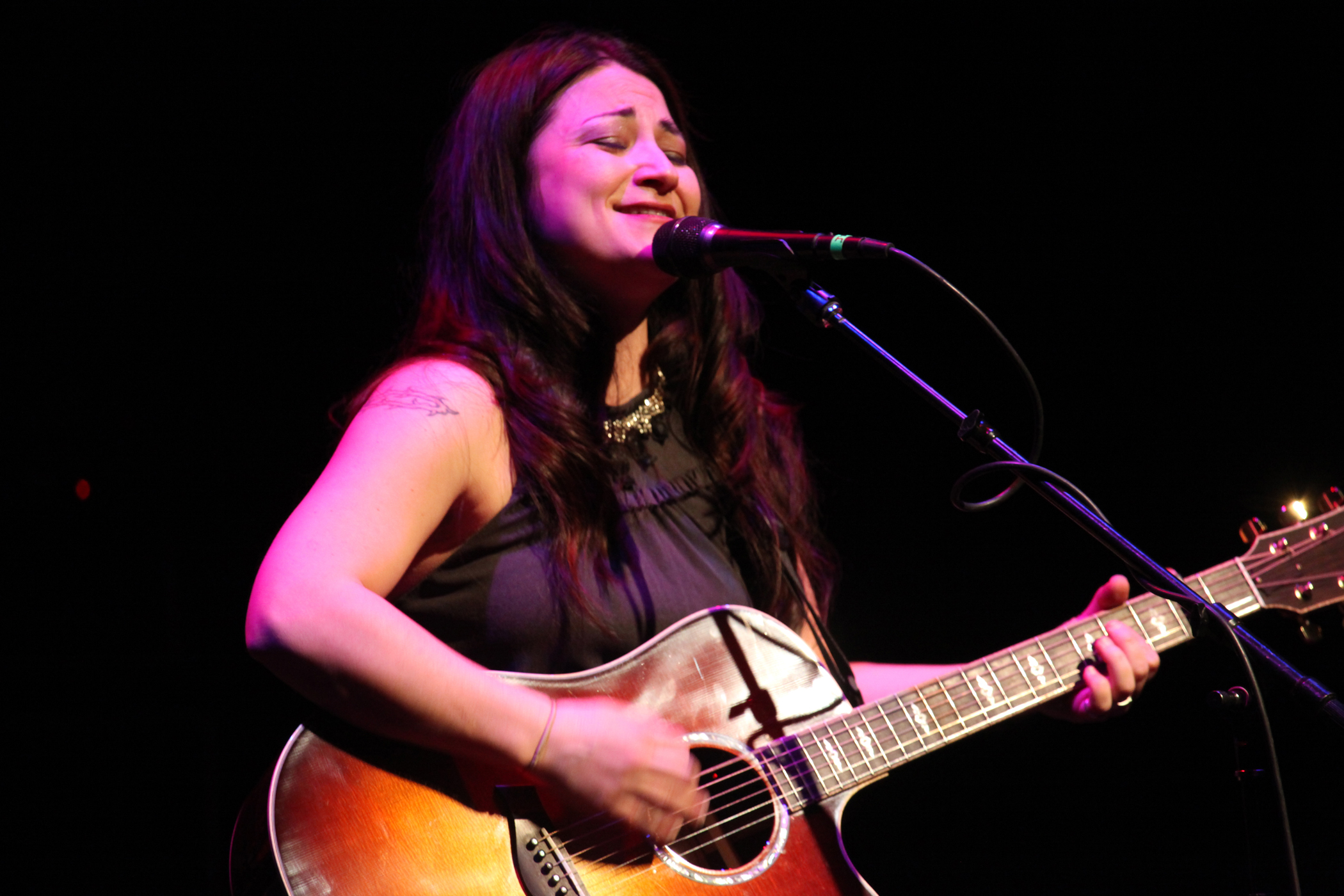
- Jennifer Knapp performing live at the Tennessee Performing Arts Center in Nashville, February 20, 2010

Background information
- Born: April 12, 1974 (age 52)
- Origin: Chanute, Kansas, U.S.
- Genres: Folk rock, Christian rock
- Years active: 1994–2003, 2009–present
- Labels: Gotee, EMI CMG, Graylin, ThirtyTigers/RED, Righteous Babe
- Website: jenniferknapp.com

Jennifer Lynn Knapp (born April 12, 1974) is an American-Australian folk rock and contemporary Christian music singer-songwriter, author, and LGBTQ advocate. She is best known for her first single "Undo Me" from her Gold-certified debut studio album, Kansas (1998), and the song "A Little More" from her Grammy Award–nominated album, Lay It Down (2000). The Way I Am (2001) was also nominated for a Grammy. In total, the three albums have sold approximately 1 million copies.

After a seven-year hiatus, Knapp returned to music and announced that she was in a relationship with a woman, sparking controversy among her Christian fans and becoming one of the first and most well-known Christian music artists to come out as gay. On May 11, 2010, she released Letting Go which debuted at No. 73 on the Billboard 200 chart. Knapp's memoir, Facing the Music, was published in 2014. Since then, she has become an advocate for LGBTQ Christians and continued to perform and create music. Her most recent album is Kansas 25 (2024), a re-recording of her debut album.

== Early life and education ==
Knapp was born in Chanute, Kansas, on April 12, 1974, with her twin sister Lori. Knapp has called her childhood "difficult" and "abusive" due in part to her parents' acrimonious divorce and her father's remarriage.

As a teenager, she was a classical trumpet player. In 1992, Knapp attended Pittsburg State University on a music scholarship. Initially, she identified as an atheist; but, after making Christian friends, she converted to Christianity.

With the encouragement of her new friends, Knapp began writing her own Christian music and performing locally as much as possible. Years later, she spoke about the role that her college years played in kickstarting her career: "I just kept saying 'yes' to people who asked me to play [...] and people just kept asking me to play." Knapp began selling her two independent albums at shows. Her second album, Wishing Well, attracted the attention of Christian producer TobyMac, who signed her to Gotee Records. She left school to go on tour before finishing her degree.

== Musical career ==
=== 1998–2002: Contemporary Christian Music career ===
Kansas (1998), Knapp's critically acclaimed studio debut, eventually sold over 500,000 copies, becoming Gold-certified by the RIAA. Knapp won 1999 Dove Awards for New Artist of the Year and Rock Song of the Year for "Undo Me". She also contributed vocals to Audio Adrenaline's cover of "It Is Well with My Soul", and an early studio version of "A Little More" from Lay It Down was featured on Sparrow Records' Listen Louder (1999). Knapp toured the US, singing primarily in churches but also performing at festivals. At the 1999 Lilith Fair, she joined the Indigo Girls and Sarah McLachlan on stage to sing "Closer To Fine", a performance she has referred to as her favorite concert experience.

In addition to writing and performing music, Knapp co-founded an artist management company, Alabaster Arts, with business partner Steve Thomas. She was motivated by a desire to mentor Christian musicians as well as to ensure she would have a job after her music career. Alabaster's clients included Relient K, The O.C. Supertones, and Katy Hudson (later known as Katy Perry).

Unlike her previous solo acoustic album, Lay It Down (2000) featured multiple backing musicians. That year she headlined a national "Christian heavyweight" tour with Third Day, who observed that Knapp helped attract a larger and broader audience for their concerts. In several interviews, Knapp spoke about the possibility of expanding outside of the Christian music market, saying "I want to reach as many people as possible". The album reached #1 on the Christian music charts and #77 on the Billboard 200 and garnered a nomination for Best Rock Gospel Album in the 2000 Grammy Awards. Additionally, the Los Angeles Times called her "a rising star in Christian music".

Knapp headlined a nationwide tour for the first time in 2001. The Back 40 Tour featured Bebo Norman and Justin McRoberts. Recordings from the tour were later released as Jennifer Knapp Live (2006). Around this time, her songs were featured on several episodes of the television drama Felicity.

Knapp's next album, The Way I Am (2001), was inspired by the crucifixion and Jesus Christ's incarnation. The album was recorded while Knapp was on tour and featured the London Symphony Orchestra on the song "By and By". Billboard called the album "a project that easily ranks among the best Christian albums released in recent memory", while Crosswalk.com argued that the album was too much of a departure from Knapp's earlier style. The Way I Am reached #10 on the Christian music charts and #130 on the Billboard 200; it was nominated for a 2002 Grammy Award for Best Rock Gospel Album but lost to Third Day. In 2002, Knapp toured with Jars of Clay and Shaun Groves on The Eleventh Hour Tour.

Together, Knapp's first three studio albums have sold more than 1 million copies.

=== 2002–2008: Hiatus ===
Over the course of her Christian music career, Knapp grew increasingly disillusioned with the conservative views of the industry, particularly its emphasis on purity culture and evangelism and its scrutiny of her faith and behavior. She faced burnout due to her hectic schedule that included touring 250 days a year and recording two albums in two years. Additionally, she realized she was interested in pursuing a relationship with her road manager, Karen. She later stated: "I had some difficult decisions to make and what that meant for my life and deciding to invest in a same-sex relationship".

By mid-2001, Knapp had resolved to complete the next year's contractual obligations and then take a break from her music career. In her memoir, Knapp describes this decision leading to conflict with her business partner at Alabaster Arts; after a legal battle, she lost her shares and was required to pay a percentage of her income to the company. On September 10, 2002, Knapp played the last concert of her Christian music career in Abilene, Texas, and subsequently went on hiatus, eventually moving to Australia.

While Knapp was on hiatus, her record label continued to release albums of previously recorded music. The Collection was released in 2003. The first disc consists of 15 previously released songs that had been selected based on votes from fans, while the second disc contains demos and contributions to other artists' albums and compilations. Three years later, Gotee Records issued the album Jennifer Knapp Live, which features live recordings from four shows in The Back 40 Tour. Her lead guitarist at the time, Mark Lee Townsend, had originally recorded the tracks as a tour memento but lost the tapes. After he rediscovered them, they were compiled into Knapp's first live album with no additional retouching in studio. In February 2008, Gotee Records re-issued a 10th anniversary edition of Kansas with re-mastered and additional tracks, including "Jesus Loves Me (Wishing Well version)" and other tracks from her 2006 live album.

=== 2009–2010: Return to music and coming out ===
In August 2009, Knapp's website was updated with a new design, new management, and a concert date. Her management confirmed to Patrol Magazine that she was working on new material. Her first concert after hiatus was on September 24 with Phillip LaRue at the Hotel Cafe in Los Angeles, California. In February 2010, Knapp announced that her new album, Letting Go, would be released on May 11 and supported by a spring 2010 tour with Derek Webb and summer appearances on the revived Lilith Fair tour.

In interviews with Christianity Today, Reuters, and The Advocate that were simultaneously published on April 13, 2010, Knapp announced that she is gay and has been in a relationship with a woman since 2002. Additionally, she said that Letting Go would not be a Christian album and predicted that her coming out would alienate many of her Christian fans. A few weeks later, the controversy surrounding her coming out was featured on an episode of Larry King Live, where Knapp appeared with Pastor Bob Botsford and Ted Haggard. Knapp defended her identity as a gay Christian to Botsford. When Botsford confronted Knapp for her "sin" of homosexuality, Knapp responded by asking why they were not discussing his sin instead.

Letting Go reached positions on multiple charts, including #3 on US Folk Albums and #73 on Billboard 200. Reviewers called the album: "Jennifer Knapp on steroids", "new batch of gorgeous, self-revelatory songwriting", and "a country/pop/indie journey through Knapp's recent life". Others mentioned "an engaging, wounded swagger and a radio-ready sheen" and "astonishing straightforwardness and spirituality".

=== 2011–present ===
In 2011, Knapp performed at the first annual Wild Goose Festival, a music and arts festival designed for a liberal Christian audience. Other performers and speakers included Derek Webb, Sarah Masen, and Brian McLaren. Since then, Knapp has performed regularly at the festival. The following summer, Knapp collaborated with Margaret Becker on The Hymns of Christmas. It was recorded on a budget with "one mic and one computer" and released later that year. They toured the US together in a van, performing 14 acoustic shows in support of the album release.

In early 2014, Knapp began recording a new album in Nashville with producer Jacob Lawson. The album, Set Me Free, was released on October 14, 2014, on Righteous Babe Records. Like Letting Go (2010), the album was not marketed to the Christian music industry. In an interview with The Advocate, Knapp stated that she felt "freer" as a songwriter on this album compared to her earlier Christian music albums. Her next album was Love Comes Back Around (2017), which Curve called: "love songs for grown-ups who have come a few miles". Knapp referred to the album as "my deepest look at love yet" and said that the musical style was less folk rock than she had originally expected.

As Knapp had predicted, her sexual orientation reduced her music's popularity among her Christian fanbase. However, by 2012, she was regularly appearing in front of Christian audiences again, as part of Inside Out Faith, her project of performing music and speaking about her faith and LGBTQ issues. In 2022, Knapp estimated that her fanbase was a mixture of longtime fans of her Christian music and newer fans of her non-Christian music and LGBTQ advocacy work.

To commemorate the 25th anniversary of Kansas, Knapp re-recorded the album, releasing Kansas 25 in May 2024. The album was funded via a Kickstarter campaign.

== Music style ==
Knapp's music has frequently been referred to as rock, especially folk rock. She has been compared to Melissa Etheridge, Jewel, Sheryl Crow, and Natalie Merchant.

From the beginning of her career, Knapp has had a reputation for authenticity and honesty, a quality which distinguished her early music from other CCM and which has also been observed in her later music. Her early music included spiritual themes, especially of sin and redemption, while her later music was less overtly religious.

== Personal life ==
Due in part to a difficult childhood, Knapp struggled with alcohol use issues as a young adult. After making Christian friends in college, she converted to Christianity and became celibate for 10 years.

In her memoir, Knapp describes becoming close friends with and eventually falling in love with her road manager, Karen, while she was a Christian music star. She also describes struggling to reconcile her religious beliefs with her sexual orientation. Karen assisted her in navigating her break from the music industry and dissuaded her from discarding her guitars and music awards. During Knapp's hiatus, they travelled together and began dating, eventually moving to Karen's birth country, Australia, where Knapp became a citizen.

After announcing her return to music, Knapp publicly came out as gay in 2010. Knapp's identity as a gay Christian has been controversial in the Christian community and has reduced her music's popularity in the Christian market. However, Knapp has also stated that the reactions to her coming out have been unexpectedly positive and that she has received significant support.

In 2018, Knapp completed a Master of Theological Studies at Vanderbilt University Divinity School.

Knapp lives in Nashville and is married.

== LGBTQ advocacy and writing ==
Knapp is one of the first and one of the most well-known Christian music artists to come out as gay. When Knapp first came out in 2010, she stated: "I'm in no way capable of leading a charge for some kind of activist movement" and "I'm not at all interested in personally being the one who is advocating." However, by 2014, she was called a "Christian LGBT advocate" for people trying to reconcile their religious beliefs with their sexual orientation. In an interview with The Advocate, she stated: "I don't have any particular wisdom other than the experience that I've got ... but telling our stories is one of the most important and powerful things we can do." To that end, Knapp launched Inside Out Faith, through which she speaks at churches and universities about her experiences as a gay Christian.

Knapp's memoir, Facing the Music: My Story, was published by Howard Books / Simon & Schuster on October 7, 2014. The book discusses her career and her experiences as a Christian and a lesbian. Howard Books, an evangelical publisher, released it during a time of increased discussions around LGBTQ people within evangelical Christianity. Howard's VP and Publisher, Jonathan Merkh, stated that he hoped the book would help readers "understand where someone may be coming from as they open up about their sexuality and their faith."

In 2015, Knapp gave a University of Nevada TEDx Talk about being a Christian lesbian. In 2019, The Tennessean published an opinion column by Knapp and Inside Out Faith co-chair Nancy VanReece critiquing the Contemporary Christian Music industry for excluding "faith rebels" who "are queer, cuss, drink and have sex". She has also contributed articles on LGBTQ topics to HuffPost.

== Discography ==
=== Albums ===
- 1994: Circle Back
- 1996: Wishing Well
- 1998: Kansas
- 2000: Lay It Down
- 2001: The Way I Am
- 2006: Jennifer Knapp Live
- 2010: Evolving EP - Six tracks, five of which were later released on Letting Go
- 2010: Letting Go
- 2012: The Hymns of Christmas (with Margaret Becker)
- 2014: Set Me Free
- 2017: Love Comes Back Around
- 2024: Kansas 25
- 2026: Supplicant

=== Compilations ===
- 1999: Heaven & Earth: A Tapestry of Worship
- 2002: City on a Hill: Sing Alleluia
- 2003: The Collection
- 2004: 8 Great Hits

=== Singles ===
- 1997: "Undo Me" – No. 1 CHR, No. 4 Rock
- 1998: "Romans" – No. 1 CHR
- 1999: "A Little More"
- 2001: "Breathe on Me"

== Charts ==
Album	Year	Chart	Peak position
Kansas	1998	US Top Christian Albums (Billboard)	11
Kansas	1998	US Heatseekers Albums (Billboard)	21
Lay It Down	2000	US Top Christian Albums (Billboard)	1
Lay It Down	2000	US Billboard 200	77
The Way I Am	2001	US Top Christian Albums (Billboard)	10
The Way I Am	2001	US Billboard 200	130
The Collection	2004	US Top Christian Albums (Billboard)	33
Letting Go	2010	US Americana/Folk Albums (Billboard)	3
Letting Go	2010	US Independent Albums (Billboard)	15
Letting Go	2010	US Digital Albums (Billboard)	19
Letting Go	2010	US Top Rock Albums (Billboard)	25
Letting Go	2010	US Billboard 200	73
Love Comes Back Around	2017	US Independent Albums (Billboard)	50

== Awards and nominations ==
Award	Year	Work	Category	Result	Ref
Dove Awards	1999	Herself	New Artist of the Year	Won	
Dove Awards	1999	"Undo Me" from Kansas	Rock Recorded Song of the Year	Won	
Dove Awards	2003	City on a Hill: Sing Alleluia	Special Event Album of the Year	Won	
Dove Awards	2004	"Believe" from The Art of Translation by GRITS	Rap/Hip Hop Recorded Song	Won	
Grammy Awards	2000	Lay It Down	Best Rock Gospel Album	Nominated	
Grammy Awards	2002	The Way I Am	Best Rock Gospel Album	Nominated	

== Certification for Kansas ==
Region	Certification	Certified units/sales
United States (RIAA)	Gold	500,000^{^}
^{^} Shipments figures based on certification alone.
