= Look Alive (Guster album) =

2019 indie rock album by Guster

Studio album by Guster
- Released: January 18, 2019
- Genres: Alternative rock, indie rock
- Length: 35:23
- Labels: Ocho Mule, Nettwerk Music Group
- Producers: Leo Abrahams, John Congleton

Guster chronology
Evermotion (2015)	Look Alive (2019)	Ooh La La (2024)

Singles from Look Alive
- 1. "Don't Go" / "Hard Times" Released: August 7, 2018; 2. "Look Alive" Released: October 30, 2018

Professional ratings
Aggregate scores
Source	Rating
Metacritic	69/100
Review scores
Source	Rating
AllMusic	3.5/5 stars
Paste	4.2/10
Slant Magazine	3.5/5 stars

Look Alive is the eighth studio album by American alternative rock band Guster, released on January 18, 2019. It is their first studio release since Evermotion in 2015, almost exactly four years earlier.

== Track listing ==
All tracks are written by Guster.

Look Alive track listing
No.	Title	Length
1.	"Look Alive"	3:53
2.	"Don't Go"	3:36
3.	"Hard Times"	3:51
4.	"Hello Mister Sun"	4:12
5.	"Overexcited"	3:13
6.	"Summertime"	3:54
7.	"Terrified"	3:30
8.	"Mind Kontrol"	3:23
9.	"Not for Nothing"	5:51
10.	"When You Go Quiet" (CD + LP bonus track)	3:10

== Charts ==
Chart performance for Look Alive
Chart (2019)	Peak position
US Billboard 200	49
US Independent Albums (Billboard)	1
US Top Alternative Albums (Billboard)	7
US Top Rock Albums (Billboard)	6
