= The Satellite (Antarctica) =

The Satellite (67°51′S 61°7′E) is a small rock peak rising to 1,100 m, protruding slightly above the ice sheet 3 nautical miles (6 km) southwest of Pearce Peak and 8 nautical miles (15 km) east of Baillieu Peak. Discovered and named in February 1931 by the British Australian New Zealand Antarctic Research Expedition (BANZARE) under Mawson. The approximate position of this peak was verified in aerial photographs taken by the U.S. Navy Operation Highjump on February 26, 1947.
