= Evermotion =

Studio album by Guster
- Released: January 13, 2015
- Genre: Alternative rock, indie rock
- Length: 38:01
- Label: Ocho Mule/Nettwerk
- Producer: Richard Swift

Guster chronology
Easy Wonderful (2010)	Evermotion (2015)	Look Alive (2019)

Singles from Evermotion
- 1. "Simple Machine" Released: September 9, 2014

Evermotion is a studio album by the American alternative rock band Guster. It was released on January 13, 2015, on both Ocho Mule, the band's own label, and Nettwerk Records. It was their first album in five years, following Easy Wonderful in 2010.

The album's title comes from a line in the song "Gangway" ("I'd lean into each turn seeking evermotion"). The first single from the album, "Simple Machine", was released on September 9, 2014, with the B-side track "Long Night". Guster stated on their website that they wanted to "become something else completely" with Evermotion.

== Critical reception ==
Professional ratings
Aggregate scores
Source	Rating
Metacritic	73/100
Review scores
Source	Rating
AllMusic	3/5 stars
PopMatters	8/10
Sputnikmusic	2.5/5 stars

Relix called the album "a relaxed and reassuring Sunday-morning record, a reservoir of tranquil tones for anyone in need of a relaxing respite."

== Track listing ==
Standard edition
No.	Title	Length
1.	"Long Night"	4:44
2.	"Endlessly"	3:44
3.	"Doin' It by Myself"	4:00
4.	"Lazy Love"	2:57
5.	"Simple Machine"	3:07
6.	"Expectation"	3:11
7.	"Gangway"	3:13
8.	"Kid Dreams"	4:13
9.	"Never Coming Down"	2:34
10.	"It Is Just What It Is"	3:40
11.	"Farewell"	2:41

== Charts ==
Chart (2015)	Peak position
US Independent Albums (Billboard)	1
US Top Alternative Albums (Billboard)	2
US Top Rock Albums (Billboard)	3
US Billboard 200	32
