= Letting Go (Jennifer Knapp album) =

Studio album by Jennifer Knapp
- Released: May 11, 2010
- Recorded: 2009–2010
- Studio: The Smoakstack (Nashville, Tennessee)
- Genre: Pop rock
- Length: 34:30
- Label: Graylin Records
- Producer: Paul Moak

Jennifer Knapp chronology
Evolving EP (2010)	Letting Go (2010)	The Hymns of Christmas (2012)

Professional ratings
Review scores
Source	Rating
AllMusic	3.5/5 stars
Jesus Freak Hideout	4/5 stars
Christianity Today	4/5 stars

Letting Go is the sixth studio album by Contemporary Christian music and folk rock singer Jennifer Knapp. The album was released on May 11, 2010, on Graylin Records.

== Critical reception ==
James Christopher Monger of AllMusic concludes his review with, "Knapp claws her way through to truths both cathartic and disappointing, all the while maintaining an engaging, wounded swagger and a radio-ready sheen that brings to mind contemporaries like Brandi Carlile and Kathleen Edwards."

Laura Nunnery Love of Jesus Freak Hideout gives this album 4 out of a possible 5 stars and begins her review with, "In 2002, Jennifer Knapp walked away from a successful music career and disappeared into the Australian outback. After eight years of silence, the small-town Kansas girl with a dry sense of humor is back, and she has a lot to say. Letting Go is both classic Knapp and unlike anything else she has released, an interesting dynamic that is sure to polarize fans. It is also some of her best work to date."

Andrea Bailey Willits of Christianity Today gives the album 4 out of 5 stars and writes, "On Letting Go, the Kansas native's lyrics are grittier and more passionate than ever."

In an interview with Knapp, Nancy Dunham of The Washington Examiner writes, "Produced by Paul Moak, the songs on the May release are something akin to a country/pop/indie journey through Knapp's recent life."

Doug Van Pelt, writing for HM Magazine begins his review, "Singer songwriter Jennifer Knapp’s latest album, Letting Go, debuts at #73 on the Billboard Top 200 Album Chart." and concludes, "With a considerable fan base, critical and commercial successes, Knapp walked away from it all at the height of her career. After seven years of soul searching and time spent in Australia, Knapp comes full circle with Letting Go."

== Track listing ==
All tracks are written by Jennifer Knapp, unless otherwise noted.

No.	Title	Writer(s)	Length
1.	"Dive In"	Jennifer Knapp; Phillip LaRue	2:49
2.	"Want for Nothing"		3:31
3.	"Fallen"		4:44
4.	"On Love"		3:42
5.	"Inside"		3:00
6.	"Letting Go"		3:46
7.	"Mr. Gray"		2:57
8.	"Better Off"	Jennifer Knapp; Paul Moak	3:24
9.	"If It Made a Difference"		3:14
10.	"Stone to the River"	Jennifer Knapp; Paul Moak	3:23
Total length:			34:30

== Musicians ==
1 – "Dive In"

- Jennifer Knapp – acoustic guitar, lead vocals, backing vocals
- Cason Cooley – Hammond B3 organ, keyboards
- Paul Moak – electric guitar
- Tony Lucido – bass
- Will Sayles – drums, percussion

2 – "Want For Nothing"

- Jennifer Knapp – acoustic guitar, lead vocals, backing vocals
- Cason Cooley – acoustic piano, keyboards
- Paul Moak – electric guitar, 12-string acoustic guitar
- Tony Lucido – bass
- Will Sayles – drums, percussion

3 – "Fallen"

- Jennifer Knapp – acoustic guitar, lead vocals, backing vocals
- Cason Cooley – upright piano, Hammond B3 organ
- Paul Moak – acoustic guitar, pedal steel guitar, electric guitar
- Matt Pierson – bass
- Will Sayles – drums, percussion

4 – "Oh Love"

- Jennifer Knapp – acoustic guitar, lead vocals, backing vocals
- Cason Cooley – acoustic piano, keyboards
- Paul Moak – electric guitar, backing vocals
- Tony Lucido – bass
- Will Sayles – drums, percussion
- Claire Indie – cello

5 – "Inside"

- Jennifer Knapp – acoustic guitar, lead vocals, backing vocals
- Cason Cooley – keyboards
- Paul Moak – electric guitar
- Tony Lucido – bass
- Will Sayles – drums

6 – "Letting Go"

- Jennifer Knapp – acoustic guitar, lead vocals
- Cason Cooley – Hammond B3 organ, keyboards
- Paul Moak – electric guitar, backing vocals
- Matt Pierson – bass
- Will Sayles – drums, percussion

7 – "Mr. Gray"

- Jennifer Knapp – acoustic guitar, lead vocals, backing vocals
- Cason Cooley – keyboards, pump organ
- Paul Moak – acoustic guitar, mando-guitar, vibraphone
- Matt Pierson – bass
- Will Sayles – percussion

8 – "Better Off"

- Jennifer Knapp – acoustic guitar, vocals
- Cason Cooley – keyboards
- Paul Moak – mando-guitar, pedal steel guitar
- Tony Lucido – bass
- Will Sayles – drums, percussion

9 – "If It Made A Difference"

- Jennifer Knapp – acoustic guitar, lead vocals, backing vocals
- Cason Cooley – acoustic piano, keyboards
- Paul Moak – acoustic guitar, electric guitar
- Matt Pierson – bass
- Will Sayles – drums, percussion

10 – "Stone To The River"

- Jennifer Knapp – acoustic guitar, lead vocals, backing vocals
- Cason Cooley – acoustic piano, Hammond B3 organ, pump organ
- Paul Moak – electric guitar, 12-string acoustic guitar, backing vocals
- Tony Lucido – bass
- Will Sayles – drums, percussion
- Claire Indie – cello

== Production ==
- John Huie – executive producer
- Mitchell Solarek – executive producer, A&R direction, management
- Paul Moak – producer, engineer
- Justin March – assistant engineer
- F. Reid Shippen – mixing at Robot Lemon (Nashville, Tennessee)
- Erik "Keller" Jahner – mix assistant
- Andrew Mendelson – mastering at Georgetown Masters (Nashville, Tennessee)
- Nattihaphol Abhigantophand – mastering assistant
- Shelley Anderson – mastering assistant
- Daniel Bacigalupi – mastering assistant
- Fairlight Hubbard – art direction, photography, stylist
- Amy M. Phillips – art direction, photography, stylist
- Kristi Brazell – A&R coordinator

Track information and credits adapted from Discogs and AllMusic, then verified from the album's liner notes.

== Charts ==
Chart performance for Letting Go
Chart (2010)	Peak position
US Billboard 200	73
US Digital Albums (Billboard)	19
US Folk Albums (Billboard)	3
US Independent Albums (Billboard)	15
US Top Rock Albums (Billboard)	25
