= Easy Wonderful =

Studio album by Guster
- Released: October 5, 2010
- Recorded: 2008–2010
- Genre: Alternative rock, indie rock
- Length: 41:34
- Label: Aware/Universal Republic
- Producer: Guster

Guster chronology
Ganging Up on the Sun (2006)	Easy Wonderful (2010)	Evermotion (2015)

Easy Wonderful is the sixth studio album by the American alternative rock band Guster, released on October 5, 2010, on Universal Republic. From August 24 to October 18, 2010, videos for all of the tracks on the album were posted to Vimeo. The first single from the album, "Do You Love Me" was released on iTunes and through the band's website on August 3, 2010. It was the last album to feature Joe Pisapia, who left the band shortly before the album's release.

== Reception ==
Professional ratings
Aggregate scores
Source	Rating
Metacritic	81/100
Review scores
Source	Rating
AllMusic	4/5 stars
American Songwriter	3.5/5 stars
Billboard	4/5 stars
Entertainment Weekly	B
Slant Magazine	4/5 stars
Sputnikmusic	3.5/5
PopMatters	8/10
Uncut	4/5 stars

Easy Wonderful received positive reviews from critics. On Metacritic, the album holds a score of 81/100 based on 10 reviews, indicating "universal acclaim".

== Track listing ==
Standard edition
No.	Title	Length
1.	"Architects & Engineers"	2:55
2.	"Do You Love Me"	3:40
3.	"On the Ocean"	4:22
4.	"This Could All Be Yours"	3:32
5.	"Stay with Me Jesus"	3:02
6.	"Bad Bad World"	4:30
7.	"This Is How It Feels to Have a Broken Heart"	3:23
8.	"What You Call Love"	3:37
9.	"That's No Way to Get to Heaven"	2:16
10.	"Jesus and Mary"	3:30
11.	"Hercules"	2:52
12.	"Do What You Want"	3:55

Deluxe edition bonus tracks
No.	Title	Length
13.	"Well"	2:38
14.	"Jonah"	3:22
15.	"Lost at Sea"	3:12
16.	"OK Alright" (iTunes-exclusive track)	2:48

== Charts ==
Chart (2010)	Peak position
US Top Alternative Albums (Billboard)	2
US Top Rock Albums (Billboard)	5
US Billboard 200	22
