= Brian Rosenworcel =

American drummer

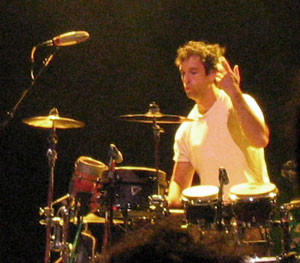

Background information
- Origin: West Hartford, Connecticut, U.S.
- Genres: Alternative rock, indie rock, jangle pop
- Instrument: Drums
- Member of: Guster
- Education: Tufts University (BA)
- Relatives: Jessica Rosenworcel (sister)

Brian Rosenworcel is an American drummer and co-founder of the band Guster.

== Early life and education ==
Rosenworcel is a native of West Hartford, Connecticut. He co-founded Guster while studying at Tufts University in the early-1990s. Rosenworcel earned a Bachelor of Arts degree from Tufts in 1995.

== Career ==
For many years, Rosenworcel exclusively played hand drums in the band, before expanding his setup to include a more traditional drum kit. Rosenworcel has co-written several of the group's songs and, beginning with 2003's Keep it Together, contributed to their lyrics.

Rosenworcel has maintained the band's active studio and tour journals since 1999.

== Personal life ==
Rosenworcel resides in Brooklyn, New York. His sister is FCC commissioner Jessica Rosenworcel. He is Jewish.
