= Joe Pisapia =

- Pisapia signs an autograph in 2004.

Background information
- Born: July 25, 1968 (age 58)
- Origin: U.S.
- Genres: Alternative
- Instruments: guitar, vocals, bass, banjo, harmonica, keyboard, lap steel guitar, cow bell, appalachian dulcimer
- Formerly of: Guster
- Website: joepisapia.bandcamp.com

Joe Pisapia (born July 25, 1968) is an American record producer, songwriter, and multi-instrumentalist, who was formerly a part of the band Guster and k.d. lang and the Siss Boom Bang. In the past he has also released albums with his band Joe, Marc's Brother, his side project Watercolor, and the solo albums Daydreams (2002) and Nightvision (2015).

== Albums ==
Pisapia released his first solo album Daydreams in 2002. He and Liz Hodder collaborated to produce Beautiful Mistakes under the band name Watercolor. With his band Joe, Marc's Brother, he has released Around The Year With Joe, Marc's Brother, The Pennsylvania Sessions, Autumnninetyeight EP, and 'The Debut Of Joe, Marc's Brother. In 2000, he worked with Anthony Rapp to release the album Look Around. He was involved with Guster for the production of Keep It Together and was pronounced an official member shortly thereafter at a show in Portland, Maine, as is documented on the DVD Guster on Ice. The band released their album, Ganging Up on the Sun, June 20, 2006. He later teamed up with k.d. lang and the Siss Boom Bang, co-producing and co-writing much of Sing It Loud. Guster announced, in a letter to their fans, that Pisapia would be amicably leaving their band to join k.d. lang on the road for her upcoming tour. He produced the Ben Folds Five album The Sound of the Life of the Mind, released in 2012. He performs pedal steel guitar on Jennifer Knapp's 2014 album Set Me Free.

On March 19, 2015, he released his second solo album, Nightvision, along with three singles: "Burned Out," "Suitcase and Guitar," and "Wake My Heart." The release of Nightvision coincided with an installment of an ongoing live performance series 'The Pisapia Love-In' in Nashville, Tennessee.

== Discography ==
=== Solo works ===
- Daydreams (2002)
- Nightvision (2015)
- Cosmic Christmas (2018)
- Connection (2018)

=== Producer ===
- The Pierces - s/t (2000)
- Anthony Rapp - Look Around (2000)
- Watercolor - Beautiful Mistakes (2002)
- Joe Pisapia - Daydreams (2002)
- Dan Haas - Goodbye Moon (2003)
- Guster - Ganging Up on the Sun (2006)
- Josh Rouse - Country House City Mouse (2007)
- Guster - Easy Wonderful (2010)
- Matt Wertz - While We're Becoming (2010))
- k.d. lang and the Siss Boom Bang - Sing It Loud (2011)
- Ben Folds Five - The Sound of the Life of the Mind (2012)
- Oakhurst - Barrel (2012)
- The Silver Seas - Alaska (2014)
- Chuck Mead - Free State Serenade (2014)
- William Tyler - Lost Colony (2014)
- Andie Lou - Sunset Deer (2015)
- Drew Holcomb and the Neighbors - Medicine (2015)
- Joe Pisapia - Nightvision (2015)
- Jason Scavone - Find Today (2016)
- Dan Haas - Polishing Stones (2016)
- Tara Vaughan - Dandelion Wine (2016)
- Drew Holcomb and the Neighbors - Souvenir (2017)

== Podcast ==
There is a podcast available chronicling the making of Ganging Up on the Sun available through iTunes or Guster's website titled "Joe's Place", as they produced the album in Pisapia's attic. Dave Yonkman shot this footage.
