= Guster =

American alternative rock band

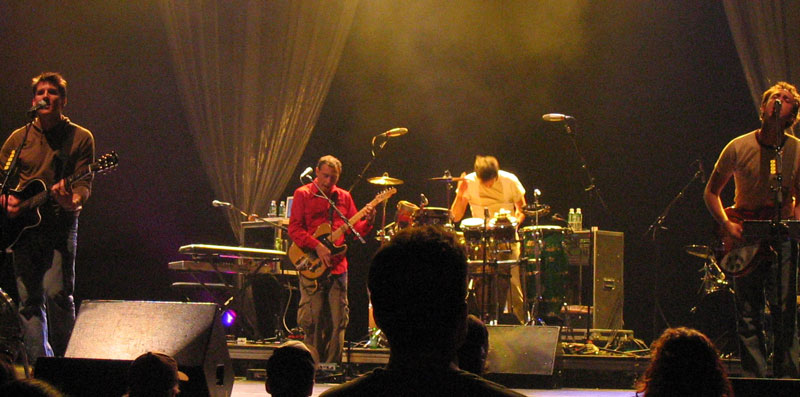
- Guster playing a show in Boston in 2004

Background information
- Origin: Somerville, Massachusetts, U.S.
- Genres: Alternative rock; jangle pop; indie rock
- Years active: 1991–present
- Labels: Aware; Palm; Sire; Reprise; Warner Bros.; Columbia; Nettwerk
- Members: Ryan Miller; Adam Gardner; Brian Rosenworcel; Luke Reynolds
- Past members: Joe Pisapia
- Website: www.guster.com

Guster is an American alternative rock band formed in Somerville, Massachusetts. Founding members Adam Gardner, Ryan Miller, and Brian Rosenworcel began practice sessions while attending Tufts University and formed the band in 1991. The members met during the freshman Wilderness Orientation program in August of that year, playing publicly together as a trio two months later at the Midnight Cafe coffee house in the common area of the Lewis Hall dormitory. While attending Tufts, the band lived at 139 College Avenue in Somerville.

The band stayed "underground" for its first two full-length albums, Parachute (1994) and Goldfly (1997), but broke into the musical mainstream in 1999 with its third studio album Lost and Gone Forever, featuring the single "Fa Fa", which made it onto the Adult Top 40. The band enjoyed moderate success on the charts with Keep It Together, its fourth album, with two singles in the Adult Top 40 ("Careful" and "Amsterdam"). Joe Pisapia joined the official lineup for Keep It Together and its followup, Ganging Up on the Sun, which peaked at 25 on the Billboard 200. Various television shows and movies have featured the band's music, including Martian Child, which featured its song "Satellite"; Disturbia; Wedding Crashers; Life as a House, which makes several allusions to the band; The O.C.; and an ad for The Weather Channel. The band earned its first gold record in 2018 for its single "Satellite".

Guster's tours were originally local, but began to spread as the band gained popularity. In 1999, Guster gave its first performance in Canada, followed by a 2004 tour in Britain that had four shows in London and one in Manchester. Guster maintains a liberal taping policy and has a very dedicated and active taping community. In addition, the band has released several live shows via iTunes.

== History ==
=== 1990s ===
The band members met during freshman orientation at Tufts University in 1991. A year later, after writing a few songs in their dorm rooms, the band named itself Gus and booked its first gig. The band recorded its first album independently in 1994, titled Parachute. This album established the band as a favorite of the same 1990s scene that became popular through bands such as the Dave Matthews Band, The Disco Biscuits, moe., Phish, and Widespread Panic. The band was still in college when it recorded the album. Shortly after the release of Parachute, another artist calling himself Gus signed a deal with a major record company, so the band renamed itself Guster.

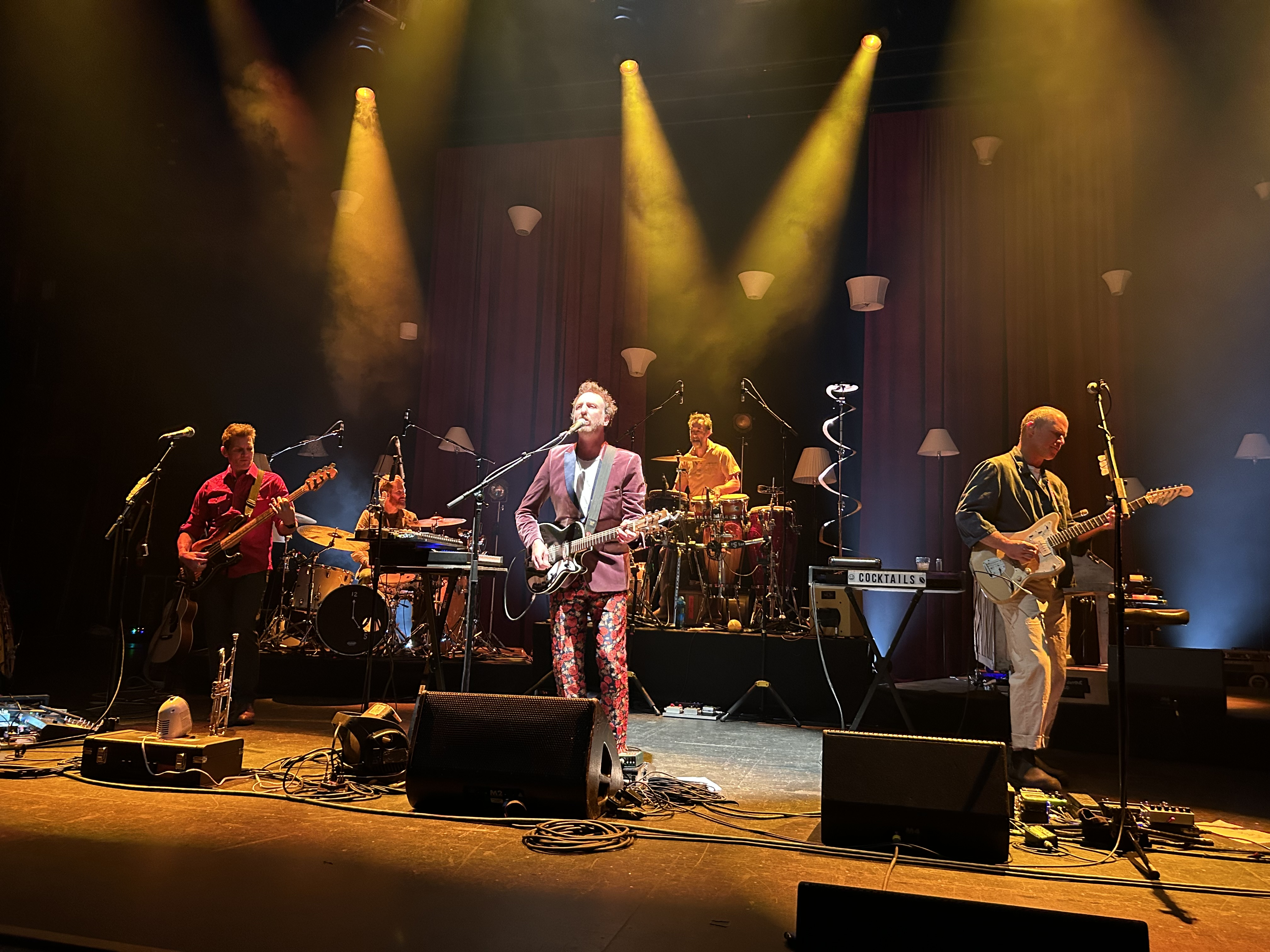
Guster performing at the Capitol Theatre in Port Chester, NY on April 8, 2023.

In 1996, Guster independently recorded its second album, Goldfly, releasing it early the next year. In 1998 the band signed with Sire Records and re-released Goldfly. In 1999, the band released the album Lost and Gone Forever, produced by Steve Lillywhite. With the backing of a major label, the band appeared on shows such as the Late Show with David Letterman, and it released its first video, for the song "Fa Fa". The band also appeared at Woodstock '99 and performed at the 1999 Stardust Picnic festival at Historic Fort York, Toronto.

=== 2000s ===
Guster released its fourth album, Keep It Together, in 2003, with the first single, "Amsterdam", getting significant airplay on the radio. Multi-instrumentalist Joe Pisapia, who had been touring with the band, then became a full-time member. A live album/DVD, Guster on Ice, compiled from two shows in Portland, Maine, in December 2003, was released in 2004. Guster released its fifth full-length studio album, Ganging Up on the Sun, on June 20, 2006. The single "Manifest Destiny/Sorority Tears" was released online in November 2005. On September 27, 2006, Guster won Album of the Year (Major) at the Boston Music Awards. Alongside Ganging Up on the Sun, the band released on its website a documentary comedy series called Joe's Place. The band also participated in the Barenaked Ladies' Ships and Dip cruise. In 2009, Guster took part in a similar event with John Mayer called Mayercraft Carrier 2 aboard the Carnival Splendor.

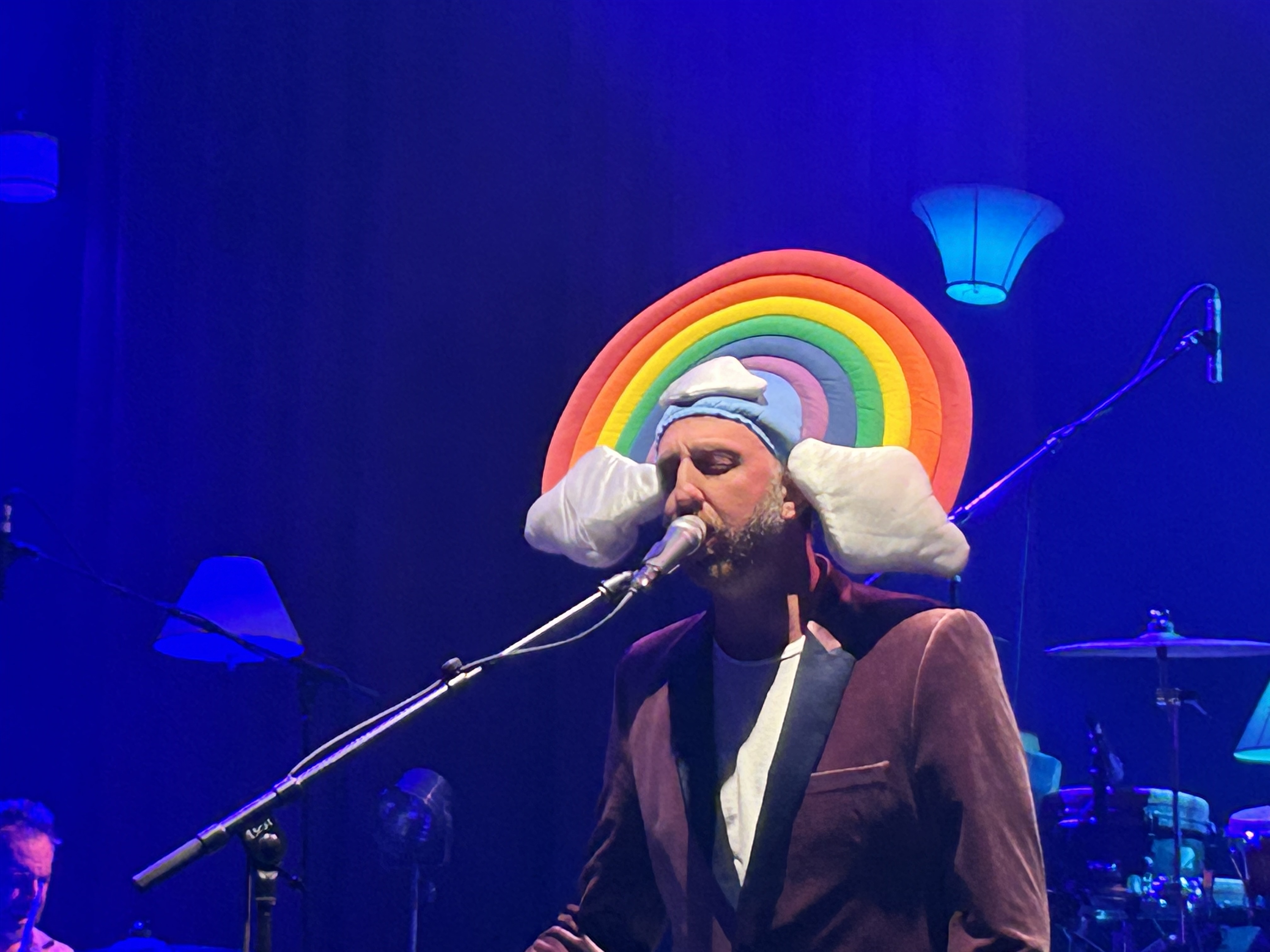
Guster lead singer Ryan Miller performs Hello Mister Sun at The Capitol Theatre in Port Chester, NY on April 8, 2023, while wearing the customary rainbow hat, which was provided this night by a fan.

=== 2010s ===
Guster released its sixth studio album, Easy Wonderful, on October 5, 2010. Mixing for the album began on March 15, 2010, according to the band's Twitter account. On April 30, Guster released "Jonah", an outtake from sessions for the upcoming album, on the Download to Donate for Haiti compilation album. On July 20, Guster released the song "Bad, Bad World" as a free download on its website. Before starting its fall 2010 tour, Guster announced that Pisapia would not be touring with the band. Instead, Pisapia would be touring with k.d. lang, with whom he had been writing songs. It was also announced that Luke Reynolds would fill in for Pisapia as of September 12. On July 26, 2011, Ryan Miller went onto turntable.fm to give live previews of tracks from Guster's On The Ocean EP and listen to music with fans.

In early 2014, it was announced that Guster was recording its seventh studio album under the production of The Shins keyboardist Richard Swift. Guster announced that the album was finished on April 8, 2014, and would be independently published on their Ocho Mule label. Guster released Evermotion on January 13, 2015, with Ocho Mule/ Nettwerk Records. The debut concert for Evermotion took place with the release of the Greenovate Boston 2014 Climate Action Plan Update with Mayor Marty Walsh as a statement of the band's support for environmental causes.

In 2016, en route to play a show in Philadelphia, the group was stopped in Pittsburgh due to the January 2016 United States blizzard. The group tweeted that they planned to play a short set on the North Side in front of a dumpster at the corner of Sampsonia Way and Veto Street at 2 p.m. Saturday. Several people showed up for the show, and a video of the show was posted to the band's Facebook page. To celebrate its 25th anniversary, the band held a series of shows around Boston in January 2017.

On January 28, 2019, Guster released its eighth studio album, Look Alive, on Nettwerk/Ocho Mule.

=== 2020s ===
In 2020, Guster embarked on an acoustic tour with Connor Ratliff from Upright Citizens Brigade that was cut short by the COVID-19 pandemic. In 2021, Guster began work on its next album with producer Josh Kaufman. In 2023 it embarked on a tour that began on March 17 in Dallas. In December 2023, in a nod to Taylor Swift's massively successful The Eras Tour, Guster announced its next tour, "We Also Have Eras," covering songs from its 30+ years as a band. In February 2024, Guster announced its ninth studio album and first new release in five years, Ooh La La.

In May 2024, Guster performed a short set at Porchfest in Somerville, on the street (Aberdeen Road) they lived on in the 1990s.

== Style ==
Guster is often recognized for its choice of instruments during their earlier years: two members playing acoustic guitars and one member playing various percussion instruments. Brian Rosenworcel, the band's percussionist (affectionately dubbed the Thunder God by fans), added to Guster's unique sound with a combination of bongos, cymbals, and other drums, playing live shows using only his bare hands. While Miller played rhythm parts, Gardner would often play a bass line on his guitar. Guster's sound is recognized for its vocal harmonies, with both Miller and Gardner singing lead vocals on different songs; in songs such as "What You Wish For" and "Happier", the two members sing different lyrics simultaneously. While Guster's studio albums included more instrumental variety (e.g. violin, bass, drum kit), its live shows generally retained the same lineup until tours supporting its album Lost and Gone Forever, in which the band diversified by playing different instruments on some songs. At this time, Rosenworcel began introducing a more traditional drum kit into the stage and studio performances in an effort to move away from bare-hand percussion.

Guster's live shows have a style of their own. For encores, the band has sometimes featured drummer Brian Rosenworcel moving to the front microphone and singing humorous covers. These have ranged from Temple of the Dog's "Hunger Strike" to 4 Non Blondes' "What's Up?" to the theme song from the TV show Cheers ("Where Everybody Knows Your Name"). Other examples include "Under the Bridge" by the Red Hot Chili Peppers, "Total Eclipse of the Heart" by Bonnie Tyler, "In the Air Tonight" by Phil Collins, and "Firework" by Katy Perry. Other traditions at live shows have developed over the years. For example, at the end of "Airport Song", people in the crowd throw ping-pong balls at the stage, in reference to the studio recording where the audio of a table tennis game can be heard in the background.

The band's humor is noted by many fans. For laughs, the three original members of Guster opened a number of their own shows as the Peace Soldiers, three redneck-looking musicians. With the addition of Joe into the band, it has since opened for itself in costume as a jam band called Trippin' Balls. During a 2001 show (which was oddly enough opened by Joe Pisapia's band Joe, Marc's Brother) in Rochester, New York, the band started their show with an empty stage. The music to The Price Is Right played over the sound system, and a voice called each of the band members down from where they had hid themselves in the audience. Upon hearing their name, each member played the part of an enthusiastic game show contestant all the way to the stage. During a show in 2002 when Guster played with John Mayer and John Butler Trio in Memphis, Tennessee, the band danced around on stage with KFC buckets covering their heads while J.B.T. was playing their set. In 2019, during their third annual On the Ocean festival in Portland, Maine, the band advertised a free afterparty "headlined by the legendary EDM group, PIPPI". During the afterparty, PIPPI was revealed to be the band dressed in matching jumpers with Pippi Longstocking style wigs.

== Fan reception ==
Pisapia signs his autograph for a fan.

Guster maintains a close relationship with its fans with regular studio updates and road journals on their website, guster.com, and signs autographs after shows. Guster once maintained a rep (representative) program, through which fans received promotional materials for upcoming concerts and albums to sell. Reps were rewarded with a special, rep-only series of EPs called The Pasty Tapes as well as invitations to rep-only concerts. Following the release of Ganging Up on the Sun, the band formed a new program called the Wrecking Machines, through which fans are able to receive posters for advertising nearby concerts. Guster is a constantly touring band, at times playing up to 250 shows a year. Kesha was an early fan and communicated with the band via email.

== Activism ==
In 2004, Guster guitarist and vocalist Adam Gardner and his wife co-founded Reverb, an organization dedicated to assisting touring artists by making activities more environmentally sound. It operates from within the music industry as well as the environmental world. Reverb greens artists' tours and the music business at large while raising awareness and support for the environment through an interactive eco-village. Since its inception, Reverb has worked with (among others) Billie Eilish, Jack Johnson, Barenaked Ladies, Bonnie Raitt, John Mayer, Dave Matthews Band, and Guster. In July 2006, Gardner was among those interviewed about Reverb by The Green Room magazine, which would later interview Gardner alone in coverage of a Guster show. Newsweek did a similar profile in its April 16, 2007, issue.

In 2006, Guster named its spring tour the Campus Consciousness Tour. The band toured with The Format, and it powered its buses and trucks with biodiesel and aimed to use the tour to teach audiences about the environment. Participation in the early 2007 IZStyle Winter Tour had similar goals. In fall 2007, Guster headlined the Crocs' Next Step Campus Tour with Brett Dennen as a supporting act. The tour promoted eco-friendly green initiatives while educating attendees on ways to help the environment. The tour stopped at fifteen colleges.

== Band members ==
- Adam Gardner – lead and backing vocals, guitar, bass guitar, keyboards, banjo, trumpet (1991–present)
- Ryan Miller – lead and backing vocals, guitar, bass guitar, piano, banjo, harmonica, ukulele, keytar (1991–present)
- Brian Rosenworcel – drums, percussion, trombone (1991–present)
- Luke Reynolds – guitar, bass guitar, banjo, electronic keyboards, backing vocals (2010–present)

Touring musicians

- Dave Butler – drum tech, drums, percussion, keyboards (2015–present)

Past members

- Joe Pisapia – guitar, bass guitar, banjo, harmonica, electronic keyboard, lap steel guitar, cow bell, Appalachian dulcimer, backing vocals (2003–2010)

== Discography ==
Studio albums

- Parachute (1994)
- Goldfly (1997)
- Lost and Gone Forever (1999)
- Keep It Together (2003)
- Ganging Up on the Sun (2006)
- Easy Wonderful (2010)
- Evermotion (2015)
- Look Alive (2019)
- Ooh La La (2024)
