= Ryan Miller (musician) =

American musician (born 1972)

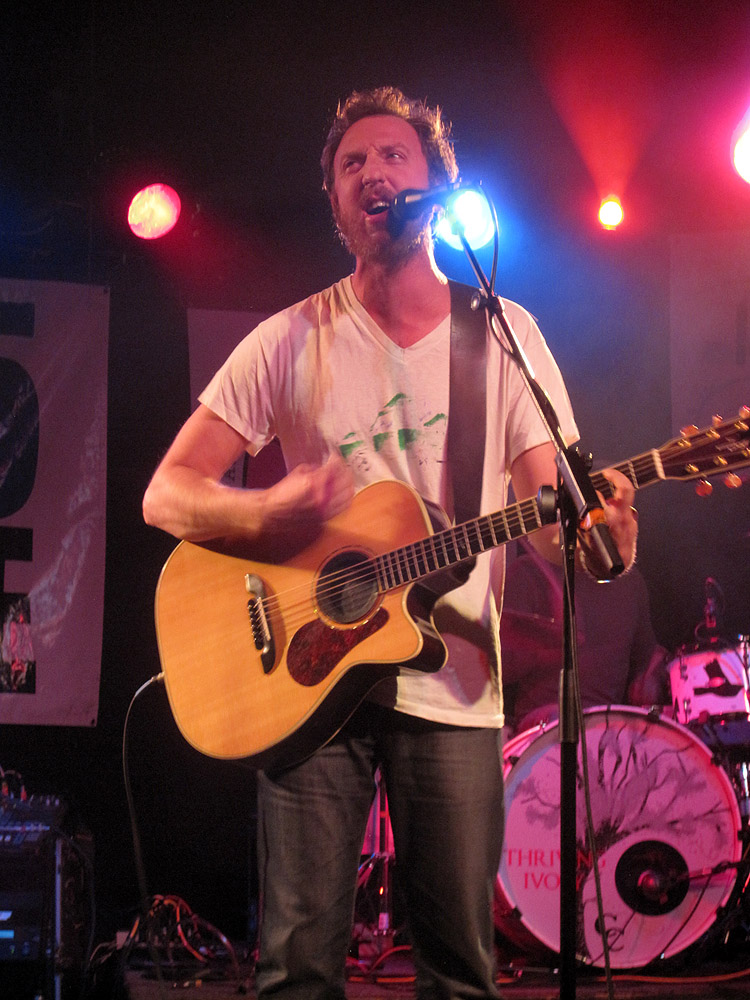
- Miller in concert, 2010

Background information
- Born: November 21, 1972 (age 53)
- Origin: Lubbock, Texas, US
- Genre: Alternative
- Occupations: Musician, singer-songwriter, screenwriter, composer, writer, host
- Instruments: Vocals, guitar, bass, piano, keyboards

Ryan Matthew Miller (born November 21, 1972) is an American musician. He is the co-lead singer for the alternative rock band Guster playing guitar, piano and bass.

== Life and career ==
Ryan was born on November 21, 1972, in Lubbock, Texas, to Ross and Cookie Miller. He grew up as an only child and was raised in Dallas, Texas, graduating from Berkner High School in 1991, where he had his own band, the Silents.

He majored in religious studies at Tufts University and graduated with a bachelor of arts in 1995. He has since pursued a full-time career in music and art. Guster was formed when Miller met bandmates Adam Gardner and Brian Rosenworcel while the three were freshmen at Tufts University in August 1991, a few years later, they met bandmate Joe Pisapia.

== Theater composer ==
Approached by Broadway alum Nick Blaemire, Miller began working on a musical adaptation of Safety Not Guaranteed in the fall of 2023 alongside a book written by Blaemire. Brooklyn Academy of Music announced they will premiere the musical, featuring all new music and lyrics by Miller, for a 5-week run at the historic 849-seat Harvey Theater beginning on September 17, 2024. Directed by Lee Sunday Evans, Nkeki Obi-Melekwe (Tina: The Tina Turner Musical) and Taylor Trensch (Dear Evan Hansen) star as Darius and Kenneth, respectively. Ashley Pérez Flanagan, Pomme Koch, Rohan Kymal and John-Michael Lyles round out the cast.

== Film composer ==
Miller has composed the scores for over 15 feature films including: Safety Not Guaranteed (2012), The Kings of Summer (2013), In a World... (2013), Tig (2015),The Fundamentals of Caring (2016), Mr. Roosevelt (2017), The Last Summer (2019), How It Ends (2021), Babes (2024) and the television show Playing House (2017).

== Songwriter ==
Miller has had several collaborations with other artists such as "Your Hand I Will Never Let It Go" written by Miller for Stevie Nicks and the film Book of Henry, "The Clown" with Dave Eggers for his 30 Days, 30 Songs project as well as co-producing "Words" with Sharon Van Etten for the film Tig.

== Television host ==
Spurred by a move from NYC to Vermont, Miller created a TV series on Vermont PBS called Makin' Friends with Ryan Miller in which he travels around the state making friends with "high functioning weirdos". He then served as the creative director and host of Vermont PBS' live music and interview show Bardo interviewing Tune-Yards, San Holo, Lake Street Dive among others.

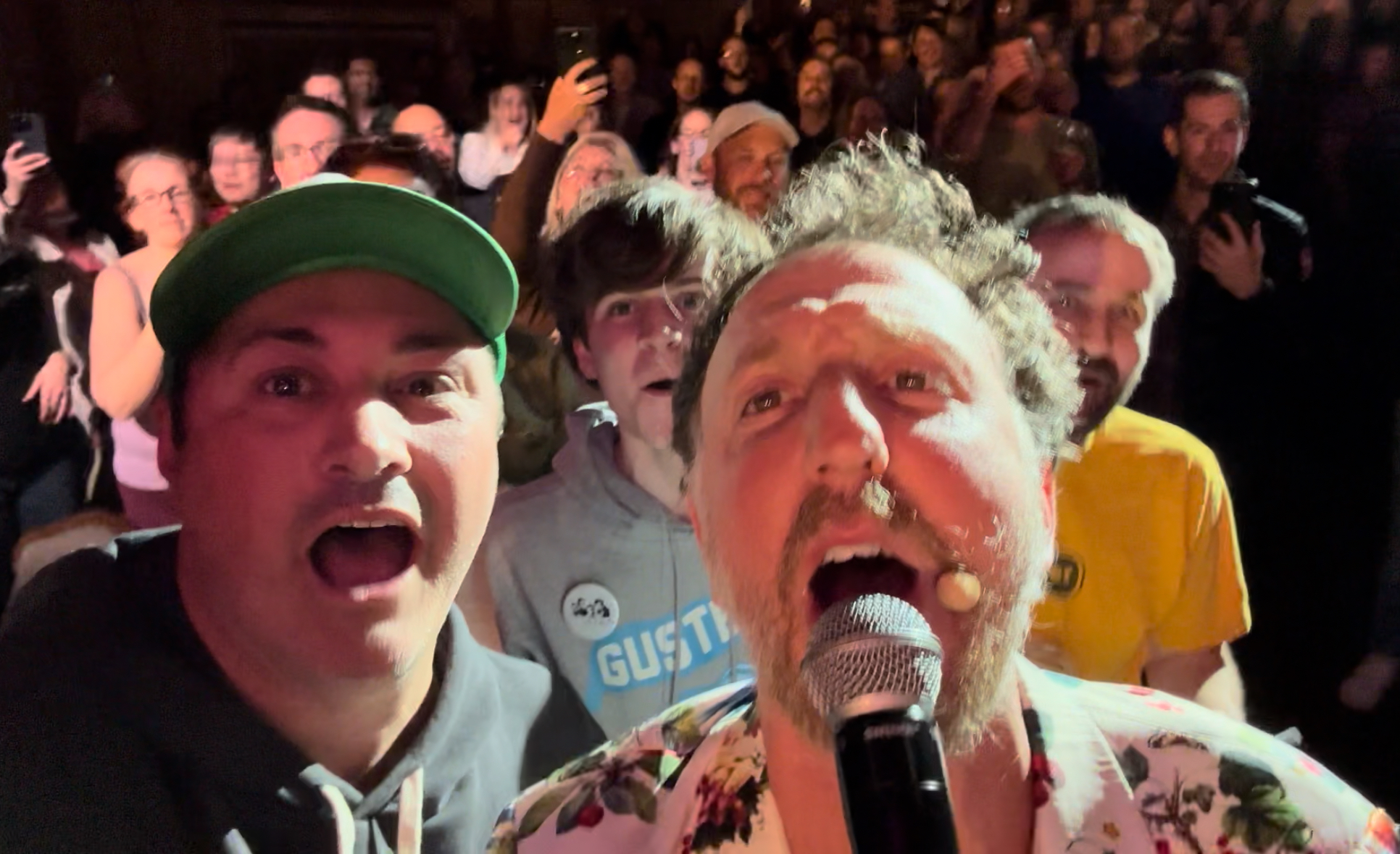
Ryan Miller sings Doin' It By Myself with a fan at a show at Count Basie Theatre in Red Bank, NJ in 2024.

Miller has appeared as a guest several times on The George Lucas Talk Show, as well as providing multiple theme songs for their various fundraisers and the theme song for their current weekly broadcast. He appeared on the 2017 stage show performance titled Thank the Maker, as well as their May the AR Be LI$$ You Arli$$ marathon fundraiser, and The George Lucas Holiday Special in 2020. During the pandemic, Miller hosted a web series that featured guests like Mike Gordon.

== Writer ==
Miller is co-writer, with director Rob Perez, of the 2009 movie Nobody and served as the film's composer.

Miller has written about his experience as a touring musician during Covid for The Atlantic, articulating his experience headlining Red Rocks "I Performed A Career Highlight Show, Then Delta Hit" and "Omicron's Blow To Live Music". He also has a series in the Vermont arts weekly Seven Days, "Deep Dives", where he reports on dive bars in and around Vermont. Miller also has frequent bylines in Whalebone Magazine.

In 2021, Miller launched a Substack newsletter called Weird And Wonderful World where he writes about sandwiches, tiny museums, haunted houses, art installations and other weird/wonderful places and things.

== Actor ==
In the fall of 2023, Miller starred in Brian Brightly's feature-length dark comedy The Wake alongside Michael Chernus, Rob Yang, Ross Partridge and Julia Randall. Other credits include Zoe Lister-Jones' Band Aid and Colin Thompson's Light Years.

== Animation project ==
Miller and Alex Plapinger co-created the animated short series "Pretty Good Story", a 10-episode series hosted by Miller and with hand painted frames by musician/artist John Andrews (Woods, Cut Worms).
