= Hanukkah music =

Music associated with Hanukkah

Hanukkah music (or Chanukah music) (Hebrew: שירי חנוכה) contains several songs associated with the festival of Hanukkah.

== Hanukkah blessings ==
There are three Hanukkah blessings (Modern Hebrew: בְּרָכוֹת לֵחֲנֻכָּה Berakhot Laḥanukka, Lit: Hanukkah blessings) that are sung for lighting the candles of the menorah. The third blessing (Shehecheyanu) is only sung on the first night. After the two or three blessings are sung, Hanerot Halalu is chanted.The following blessings are transliterated according to proper Modern Hebrew.

The popular tune for these blessings was composed by Samuel E. Goldfarb and his brother Israel Golfarb in the early 20th century.

English	Hebrew	Transliteration
Blessed are You, Lord our God, King of the universe, Who sanctified us with His commandments and commanded us to kindle the Hanukkah lights.	בָּרוּךְ אַתָּה יי אֱלֹהֵנוּ מֶלֶךְ הָעוֹלָם אֲשֶׁר קִדְּשָׁנוּ בְּמִצְווֹתָיו וְצִוָּנוּ לְהַדְלִיק נֵר שֶׁל חֲנֻכָּה׃	Barukh Atta Ado-nai Elo-heinu melekh ha'olam, asher kiddeshanu be-mitzvotav, Ve-tzee-vanu le-had-leek ner shel ḥanukka.
Blessed are You, Lord our God, King of the universe, Who performed wondrous miracles for our ancestors, in those days, at this moment.	בָּרוּךְ אַתָּה יי אֱלֹהֵנוּ מֶלֶךְ הָעוֹלָם שֶׁעָשָׂה נִסִּים לַאֲבוֹתֵינוּ בַּיָּמִים הַהֵם בַּזְּמַן הַזֶּה׃	Barukh Atta Ado-nai Elo-heinu melech ha'olam, she'asah nissim la'avotenu bayamim hahem baz'man hazeh.
Blessed are You, Lord our God, King of the universe, Who has kept us in life, sustained us, and brought us to this moment.	בָּרוּךְ אַתָּה יי אֱלֹהֵנוּ מֶלֶךְ הָעוֹלָם שֶׁהֶחֱיָנוּ וְקִיְּמָנוּ וְהִגִּיעָנוּ לַזְּמַן הַזֶּה׃	baruch Atta adonai eloheinu melekh ha'olam sheheḥehyanu vekiyy'manu vehiggi'anu lazman hazeh.

== Ma'oz Tzur ==
"Ma'oz Tzur" (Hebrew: מעוז צור), also a widely known English version as "Rock of Ages", is a Jewish liturgical poem or piyyut. It is written in Hebrew, and is usually sung on the holiday of Hanukkah, after lighting the festival lights. Its six stanzas correspond to five events of Jewish history and a hope for the future. Of its six stanzas, often only the first stanza is sung (or the first and fifth), as this is what directly pertains to Hanukkah. "Ma'oz Tzur" was written sometime in the 13th century.

- Ma'oz Tzur for instruments and voice by Chibat haPiyut.

== Psalm 30 ==
A psalm, a song celebrating the Dedication of a house (Hebrew: מזמור שיר חנוכת הבית)

- Psalm 30 in Vizhnitz melody, by Invitation to Piyut

== Judas Maccabaeus ==
Judas Maccabaeus is an oratorio by George Frideric Handel. During Hanukkah, the melody for "See, the Conqu’ring Hero Comes" is used by Spanish and Portuguese Jewish communities for the hymn Ein Kelohenu.

Mrs. Maccabeus, to the tune of "Oh Hanukkah." By Ben Aronin of Congregation Anshe Emet in Chicago.

== Oh Chanukah ==
"Oh Chanukah" (also "Chanukah, Oh Chanukah") is an English version of the Yiddish "Oy Chanukah" (Yiddish: חנוכּה אױ חנוכּה Khanike Oy Khanike). The English words, while not a translation, are roughly based on the Yiddish. "Oy Chanukah" is a traditional Yiddish Chanukah song and the English version, along with "I Have a Little Dreidel," is one of the most recognized English Chanukah songs. Both songs are playful with upbeat tempo and are sung by children. The lyrics are about dancing the horah, eating latkes, playing dreidel, lighting the candles and singing happy songs.

== I Have a Little Dreidel ==
The Dreidel Song
Performed by the Singing Sergeants of the United States Air Force Band

"I Have a Little Dreidel" (also known as the "Dreidel Song") is a very famous song in the English-speaking world for Hanukkah, which also has a Yiddish version. The Yiddish version is Ikh Bin A Kleyner Dreydl, (Yiddish: איך בין אַ קלײנער דרײדל Ikh Bin A Kleyner Dreydl Lit: I am a little dreidel). The English version of the song is well associated with the festival of Hanukkah, and is known by many Jews and non-Jews alike. The lyrics of the song are simple and about making a dreidel and playing with it. The lyrics are as follows:

I have a little dreidel
I made it out of clay,
And when it's dry and ready
O dreidel I shall play.
O dreidel dreidel dreidel
I made it out of clay,
And when it's dry and ready,
O dreidel I shall play.

== Sevivon ==
"S'vivon"
Performed by the Singing Sergeants of the United States Air Force Band

A popular Hebrew Hanukkah song, "Sevivon" or "S'vivon" (Hebrew: סביבון sevivon) is Hebrew for "dreidel", where dreidel (Hebrew: דרײדל dreydl) is the Yiddish word for a spinning top. This song, "Sevivon," is very popular in Israel and by others familiar with the Hebrew language. The English below is a literal translation, not an English version.

Hebrew

סְבִיבוֹן סוב סוב סוב
חנכּה הוא חג טוב
חנכּה הוא חג טוב
סְבִיבוֹן סוב סוב סוב

(In Israel)
סוב נא סוב כה וכה
נס גדול היה פה
נס גדול היה פה
סוב נא סוב כה וכה

(Abroad)
חַג שִׂמְחָה הוּא לַעָם
נֵס גָדוֹל הָיָה שָם
נֵס גָדוֹל הָיָה שָם
חַג שִׂמְחָה הוּא לַעָם

Transliteration from Hebrew

Sevivon, sov, sov, sov
ḥanukah, hu ḥag tov
ḥanukah, hu ḥag tov
Sevivon, sov, sov, sov!

(In Israel)
Sov na sov ko va'cho
Nes gadol hayah poh
Nes gadol hayah poh
Sov na sov ko va'kho!

(Abroad)
ḥag simḥa hu la-am
Nes gadol hayah sham
Nes gadol hayah sham
ḥag simḥa hu la-am.

English Literal Translation

Dreidel, spin, spin, spin.
Hanukkah is a great holiday.
Hanukkah is a great holiday.
Dreidel, spin, spin, spin.

(In Israel)
Spin, please, spin like this and that.
A great miracle happened here.
A great miracle happened here.
Spin, please, spin like this and that.

(Abroad)
A joyous holiday for the nation.
A great miracle happened there.
A great miracle happened there.
A joyous holiday for the nation.

== Al Hanisim ==
"Al Hanisim" (or "Al Hanissim") is a popular Hebrew song for Hanukkah taken from liturgy "Al Hanisim", and is also an Israeli folk dance. The song is about thanking God for saving the Jewish people. The most popular tune, however, is relatively recent, having been composed by Dov Frimer in 1975.

== Mi Y'malel ==
"Mi Y'malel" (or "Mi Yimalel") (Hebrew: מי ימלל "Who can retell?") is a very well known Hebrew Hanukkah song. The opening line, which literally means "Who can retell the mighty feats of Israel," is a secular rewording of Psalms 106:2, which reads "Who can retell the mighty feats of God." Below is a singable version of this song called "Who Can Retell," with words based on the Hebrew, as well as a literal translation. The song can also be sung in a round or canon.

- Mi Y'malel with instruments and 2 voices, by Rosenthal and Safyan.

Hebrew	Transliteration from Hebrew	English (singable version)	English (alternate lyrics)	English (literally translated version)
מי ימלל גבורות ישראל אותן מי ימנה הן בכל דור יקום הגיבור גואל העם שמע בימים ההם בזמן הזה מכבי מושיע ופודה ובימינו כל עם ישראל יתאחד, יקום ויגאל	Mi yimalel gvurot Yisrael, Otan mi yimne? Hen be'chol dor yakum ha'gibor Goel ha'am! Shma! Ba'yamim ha'hem ba'zman ha'ze Maccabi moshia u'fode U'v'yameinu kol am Yisrael; Yitached yakum ve'yigael!	Who can retell the things that befell us, Who can count them? In every age, a hero or sage Came to our aid. Hark! In this time of year in days of yore Maccabees the Temple did restore And tonight our people as we dream Will arise, unite, and be redeemed.	Who can retell the things that befell us, Who can count them? In every age, a hero or sage Came to our aid. Hark! In days of yore in Israel's ancient land Brave Maccabeus led his faithful band But now all Israel must as one arise Redeem itself through deed and sacrifice.	Who can tell of the heroic deeds of Israel? Who can count them? Yes in every generation a hero arises To save the people. Listen! In those days at this time The Maccabee saved and redeemed But in our days the whole people Israel; Will unite, arise, and save.

== Ner Li ==
Literally translated as "I have a candle," "Ner Li" is a simple Hebrew Hanukkah song that is popular in Israel. The words are by L. Kipnis and the music, by D. Samburski.

Hebrew	Transliteration from Hebrew	English translation
נֵר לִי, נֵר לִי, נֵר לִי דָּקִיק בַּחֲנֻכָּה נֵרִי אַדְלִיק. בַּחֲנֻכָּה נֵרִי יָאִיר, בַּחֲנֻכָּה שִׁירִי אָשִׁיר	Ner li, ner li, ner li daqiq, Bakhanukah neri 'adliq. Bakhanukah neri ya'ir Bakhanukah shirim 'ashir.	I have a candle, I have a small thin candle On Hanukkah, my candle I will light. On Hanukkah my candle will glow On Hanukkah I will sing songs.

== Chanukah Chanukah ==
Another traditional Chanukah folk song with origins in Israel is Chanukah, Chanukah Words by Levin Kipnis Transliterated and translated by Gila Ansell Brauner of Jerusalem, Israel

Chanukah, Chanukah, Chag yafeh kol kach Or chaviv, misaviv, Gil leyeled rach.

Chanukah, Chanukah, Sevivon sov sov Sov sov sov, sov sov sov, Mah na'im vatov.

CHANUKAH, CHANUKAH

Chanukah, Chanukah, What a lovely holiday! Cheerful lights around us shine, Children have fun and play.

Chanukah, Chanukah, The dreidel spins and spins. Spin your top until it stops, Have a good time, see who wins!

חנוכה חנוכה עממי מילים: לוין קיפניס לחן: עממי

חנוכה, חנוכה, חג יפה כל כך אור חביב מסביב, גיל לילד רך. חנוכה, חנוכה, סביבון סוב סוב ,סוב נא סוב, סוב נא סוב מה נעים מה טוב.

== Ocho Kandelikas ==
Ocho Kandelikas lit. 'Eight Little Candles') is a Ladino song celebrating the holiday of Hanukkah, written by the Jewish-American composer Flory Jagoda in 1983.

Ladino (transliterated)	English	Español
Hanukka linda sta aki, ocho kandelas para mi. (×2)	Beautiful Hanukkah is here, eight candles for me. (×2)	Hannuka linda está aquí, ocho candelas para mi. (×2)
O — Una kandelika, dos kandelikas, trez kandelikas, kuatro kandelikas sintyu kandelikas, sesh kandelikas, siete kandelikas, ocho kandelas para mi.	O — One little candle, two little candles, three little candles, four little candles, five little candles, six little candles, seven little candles, eight candles for me.	Una candelita, dos candelitas, tres candelitas, cuatro candelitas, cinco candelitas, seis candelitas, siete candelitas, ocho candelas para mi.
Muchas fiestas vo fazer, kon alegriyas y plazer. (×2)	Many parties to have, with happiness and pleasure. (×2)	Muchas fiestas van hacer, con alegrías y placer. (×2)
Los pastelikos vo kumer, kon almendrikas y la myel. (×2)	Little pastries to eat, with little almonds and honey. (×2)	Los pastelitos voy a comer, con almendritas y miel. (×2)

== Drey dreydl ==
Drei dreidl is a Hanukkah song written by Moishe Oysher. The melody is the same as that of Itsik Manger's "Yosl Ber", composed by D. Beygelman [see "Pearls of Yiddish Song", by Chana & Joseph Mlotek, p.173]. According to the Mloteks, the melody has also been used for the Holocaust song, "Ikh leb in geto in kavkaz" [I live in the ghetto in the Caucasus], by Khane Kheytin, and for the song "Vi der zeyger tut a klung" [When the clock strikes], by Sam Liptzin.

YIVO transliteration	English	Yiddish
Oy, breng mir broyt un breng mir vayn, Veln mir ale freylekh zayn, Tray-lay-lay-lay-lay-lay, Kh'hob shoyn latkes, fleysh un fish, Un a vays badektn tish, Tray-lay-lay-lay-lay-lay. Kh'hob di brokhes shoyn gemakht, Di menoyre shaynt a prakht, Tray-lay-lay-lay-lay-lay, Toyznt zinen yeder flam, Shtolts bin ikh mir mit mayn shtam, Tray-lay-lay-lay-lay-lay. Drey dreydl fun nun tsu gerotn, Drey dreydl tsum gerotn, Kumt di vokh fun khanike, Iz alts bay mir gerotn. Yeder likhtl hot a zin, Es dermont mikh ver ikh bin, Tray-lay-lay-lay-lay-lay, Di menoyre iz oysbashaynt, Ale zenen mayne fraynt, Tray-lay-lay-lay-lay-lay. Apikorsim ruf arayn, Zoln zey nisht gerekhnt zayn, Tray-lay-lay-lay-lay-lay, Zoln zey take zen aleyn, S'iz a groyser nes geshen, Tray-lay-lay-lay-lay-lay. Drey dreydl fun nun tsu gerotn, Drey dreydl tsum gerotn, Kumt di vokh fun khanike, Iz alts bay mir gerotn. Ver hot zikh oyf dem gerekht, Aza shtikl brekl lekht, Tray-lay-lay-lay-lay-lay, Brenen vet dokh doyres lang, Un balaykhtn unzere gang, Tray-lay-lay-lay-lay-lay. Breng afile soynem mit, Shrek zey got nor shtroft zey nit, Tray-lay-lay-lay-lay-lay, Breng mir broyt un breng mir vayn, Veln mir ale freylekh zayn, Tray-lay-lay-lay-lay-lay.	Oh, bring me bread and bring me wine, Let's all be happy, Tray-lay-lay-lay-lay-lay, I already have latkes, meat and fish, And a white tablecloth on the table, Tray-lay-lay-lay-lay-lay. I've already recited the bessings, The menora is shining proudly, Tray-lay-lay-lay-lay-lay, Every flame has a thousand souls, I am proud of my origin, Tray-lay-lay-lay-lay-lay. Turn, dreidel, from nothing to all, Turn, dreidel, and turn out well, When the Hanukka week comes I feel very lucky. Every little candle has a soul, It reminds me who I am, Tray-lay-lay-lay-lay-lay, The menora looks brilliant, Everybody is my friend, Tray-lay-lay-lay-lay-lay. Call the non-believers in, They will not be counted, Tray-lay-lay-lay-lay-lay, They will be alone, A great miracle has occurred, Tray-lay-lay-lay-lay-lay. Turn, dreidel, from nothing to all, Turn, dreidel, and turn out well, When the Hanukka week comes I feel very lucky. Who feels vindicated By this tiny sliver of light, Tray-lay-lay-lay-lay-lay, It has burnt for generations And lit up our way, Tray-lay-lay-lay-lay-lay. Bring even enemies with you, They will fear God and not dispute, Tray-lay-lay-lay-lay-lay. Bring me bread and bring me wine, Let's all be happy, Tray-lay-lay-lay-lay-lay.	אוי, ברעג מיר ברױט און ברעג מיר װײַן, װעלן מיר אַלע פֿרײלעך זײַן, טרײַ־לײַ־לײַ־לײַ־לײַ־לײַ־לײַ. כ׳האָב די ברכות שוין געמאַכט, די מנרות שײַנט אַ פראַכט, טרײַ־לײַ־לײַ־לײַ־לײַ־לײַ־לײַ. טױזנט זינען יעדער פֿלאַם, שטאָלץ בין איך מיר מיט מײַן שטאַם, טרײַ־לײַ־לײַ־לײַ־לײַ־לײַ־לײַ. דרײ דרײדל פֿון נון צו געראָטן, דרײ דרײדל צום געראָטן, קומט די װאָך פֿון חנוכּה, אַיז אַלץ בײַ מיר געראָטן. יעדער ליכט האָט אַ זין, עס דערמאָנט מיך װער איך בין, טרײַ־לײַ־לײַ־לײַ־לײַ־לײַ־לײַ. די מנורה איז אױסבאַשײַנט, אַלע זענען מײַנע פֿרײַנט, טרײַ־לײַ־לײַ־לײַ־לײַ־לײַ־לײַ. אפיקורסים רוף אַרײַן, זאָלן זײ נישט גערעכט זײַן, טרײַ־לײַ־לײַ־לײַ־לײַ־לײַ־לײַ. זאָלן זײ טאַקע זען אַלײן, ס׳איז אַ גראָסער נס געשען, טרײַ־לײַ־לײַ־לײַ־לײַ־לײַ־לײַ. דרײ דרײדל פֿון נון צו געראָטן, דרײ דרײדל צום געראָטן, קומט די װאָך פֿון חנוכּה, איז אַלץ בײַ מיר געראָטן. װער האָט זיך אױף דעם גערעכט, אַזאַ שטיקל ברעקל לעכט, טרײַ־לײַ־לײַ־לײַ־לײַ־לײַ־לײַ. ברענען װעט דאָך דורות לאַנג, און באַלײַכטן אוזערע גאַנג, טרײַ־לײַ־לײַ־לײַ־לײַ־לײַ־לײַ. ברענג אַפֿילו סיונעם מיט, שרעק זײ גאָט נאָר שטראָפֿט זײ ניט, טרײַ־לײַ־לײַ־לײַ־לײַ־לײַ־לײַ. ברענג מיר ברױט און ברענג מיר װײַן, װעלן מיר אַלע פֿרײלעך זײַן, טרײַ־לײַ־לײַ־לײַ־לײַ־לײַ־לײַ.

== Non-traditional songs ==
=== (I'm Spending) Hanukkah in Santa Monica ===
"(I'm Spending) Hanukkah in Santa Monica" is a song written by satirist singer-songwriter and mathematician Tom Lehrer.

=== Light One Candle ===
"Light One Candle" is a 1983 Hanukkah song written by Peter Yarrow of Peter, Paul, and Mary. It is a very popular song and it has been sung by the trio at their concerts. It is a song that encourages the Jewish people to remember the history of the holiday and continue their heritage. Light One Candle lyrics

=== The Chanukah Song ===
The Chanukah Song is a series of popular Hanukkah songs by Adam Sandler that are each a slightly different variation of a list of Jewish celebrities listed by Sandler for Jewish children who feel isolated during the Christmas season. It began as a skit on Saturday Night Live and then appeared on his album What the Hell Happened to Me?. Due to its popularity, Sandler recorded three follow-ups of the song. The songs often gets airplay during the winter holiday season.

=== Eight Days of Hanukka ===
"Eight Days of Hanukka" is a Hanukkah song written by Senator Orrin Hatch and Madeline Stone, a Jewish songwriter from the Upper West Side of Manhattan who specializes in Christian music. The song was written at the suggestion of Jeffrey Goldberg.

=== Hanukkah Hey Ya ===
"Hanukkah Hey Ya" is a Hanukkah spoof of a chart-topping 2003 OutKast song, "Hey Ya!," by American comedian Eric Schwartz. The song was made into an e-card in 2004. In 2009 Nefesh B'Nefesh produced a Hanukkah Flash Mob viral video that became a major success. The mob assembled on Jerusalem's Ben Yehuda Street and was choreographed by new immigrant Marvin Casey.

=== Candlelight ===
"Candlelight" is a song written and sung by The Maccabeats, an undergraduate a cappella group at Yeshiva University. The song is a cover parody of "Dynamite" by Taio Cruz, with lyrics retelling the Hanukkah story. It was released in late 2010 and quickly achieved viral status. Since 2010, The Maccabeats have produced an annual Hanukkah music video.

=== Hanukkah Rocks ===
This is an album of ten original songs written and performed by Adam Gardner of Guster and Dave Schneider of the Zambonis, as a side project called The LeeVees, released in 2005. Their motivation stemmed from an observation that there was a dearth of contemporary songs about that holiday. They also had a collaboration with Matisyahu called "Outside of December."
