= Guster discography =

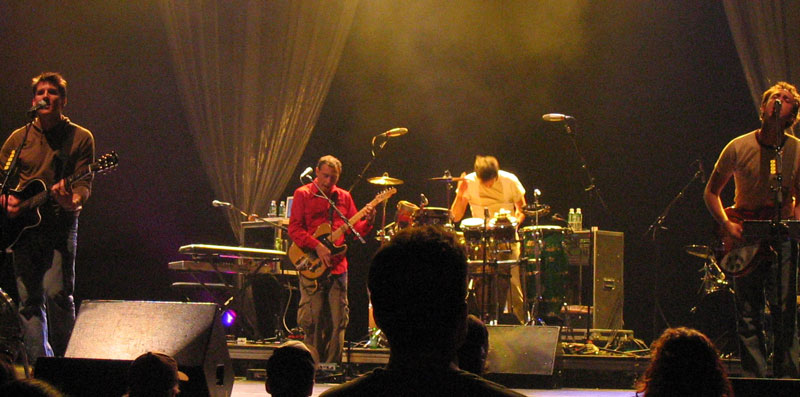
- Studio albums: 9
- Extended plays: 7
- Live albums: 3
- Singles: 14

This is a comprehensive discography of official recordings by Guster, an American alternative band from Boston, Massachusetts.

== Albums ==
=== Studio albums ===
List of studio albums, with selected chart positions
Title	Album details	Peak chart positions			
Title	Album details	US	US Alt.	US Rock	US Indie
Parachute	Released: April 15, 1994; Label: Aware; Formats: CD, LP	—	—	—	—
Goldfly	Released: March 4, 1997; Label: Hybrid; Formats: CD, LP	—	—	—	—
Lost and Gone Forever	Released: September 28, 1999; Label: Hybrid; Formats: CD, LP	169	—	—	—
Keep It Together	Released: June 24, 2003; Label: Reprise; Formats: CD, LP	38	—	—	—
Ganging Up on the Sun	Released: June 20, 2006; Label: Reprise; Formats: CD, LP	25	—	8	—
Easy Wonderful	Released: October 5, 2010; Label: Universal Republic; Formats: CD, LP, digital download	22	2	5	—
Evermotion	Released: January 13, 2015; Label: Ocho Mule/Nettwerk Music Group; Formats: CD, LP, digital download	33	2	3	1
Look Alive	Released: January 18, 2019; Label: Ocho Mule/Nettwerk Music Group; Formats: CD, LP, digital download	49	7	6	1
Ooh La La	Released: May 17, 2024; Label: Ocho Mule/Nettwerk Music Group; Formats: CD, LP, digital download	— (Note: Ooh La La did not enter the US Billboard 200, but peaked at number 30 on the Album Sales Chart.)	—	—	—
"—" denotes a recording that did not chart or was not released in that territory.

=== Live albums ===
List of live albums, with selected chart positions
Title	Album details	Peak chart positions			
Title	Album details	US	US Alt.	US Rock	US Indie
Guster on Ice	Released: May 18, 2004; Label: Warner Music Vision; Formats: CD	180	—	—	—
Live Acoustic	Released: January 8, 2013; Label: Ocho Mule; Formats: CD, Digital download	70	15	21	10
Guster Live With The [Redacted] Symphony	Released: December 2, 2013; Formats: Digital download	—	—	—	—
Parachute: Live From Brooklyn Bowl	Released: December 30, 2014; Label: Ocho Mule; Formats: CD, Digital download	—	—	—	—
Lost and Gone Forever: Live	Released: December 30, 2014; Label: Ocho Mule; Formats: CD, Digital download	—	—	—	—
Keep It Together: Live From the Beacon Theatre	Released: December 30, 2014; Label: Ocho Mule; Formats: CD, Digital download	—	—	—	—
OMAGAH! Guster With The Omaha Symphony	Released: July 24, 2020; Formats: Digital download	— (Note: OMAGAH! did not enter the US Billboard 200, but peaked at number 91 on the US Top Current Album Sales Chart.)	—	—	—

== Extended plays ==
List of extended plays
Title	EP details
The Meowstro Sings - Guster's Keep It Together	Released: 2003; Label: Reprise; Formats: Digital download
WBR Sessions	Released: 2003; Label: Reprise; Formats: Digital download
MTV2 Album Covers: Guster/Violent Femmes	Released: March 30, 2004; Label: Reprise; Formats: Digital download
Come Downstairs and Say Hello	Released: November 8, 2004; Label: Fenway; Formats: CD
Satellite EP	Released: April 10, 2007; Label: Reprise; Formats: CD
On the Ocean EP	Released: 2011; Label: Ocho Mule; Formats: CD, digital download
Zeno Mountain EP	Released: 2020; Label: Ocho Mule; Formats: Digital download

== Singles ==
List of singles, with selected chart positions, showing year released and album name
Title	Year	Peak chart positions					Album
Title	Year	US AAA	US Adult	US Alt.	US Rock Air.	US Rock DL	Album
"Airport Song"	1998	—	—	35	—	—	Goldfly
"Demons"	1998	—	—	—	—	—	Goldfly
"Barrel of a Gun"	1999	12	—	—	—	—	Lost and Gone Forever
"Fa Fa"	2000	17	26	—	—	—	Lost and Gone Forever
"Happier"	2000	—	—	—	—		Lost and Gone Forever
"Amsterdam"	2003	1	20	—	—	—	Keep It Together
"Careful"	2003	3	30	—	—	—	Keep It Together
"Keep It Together"	2004	—	—	—	—	—	Keep It Together
"Homecoming King"	2004	—	—	—	—	—	Keep It Together
"One Man Wrecking Machine"	2006	3	—	—	—	—	Ganging Up on the Sun
"Satellite"	2007	5	—	—	—	—	Ganging Up on the Sun
"Do You Love Me"	2010	9	40	—	—	37	Easy Wonderful
"This Could All Be Yours"	2010	—	—	—	—	—	Easy Wonderful
"Architects & Engineers"	2011	—	—	—	—	—	Easy Wonderful
"Simple Machine"	2014	26	—	—	—	—	Evermotion
"Endlessly"	2014	—	—	—	—	—	Evermotion
"Hard Times" / "Don't Go"	2018	—	—	—	—	—	Look Alive
"Look Alive"	2018	—	—	—	—	—	Look Alive
"Overexcited"	2019	7	—	—	50	—	Look Alive
"Crying, Laughing, Loving, Lying"	2019	—	—	—	—	—	Non-album single
"Keep Going" / "All Day"	2024	15	—	—	—	—	Ooh La La
"Maybe We're Alright"	2024	—	—	—	—	—	Ooh La La
"The Elevator"	2024	—	—	—	—	—	Ooh La La
"When We Were Stars"	2025	37	—	—	—	—	Ooh La La
"—" denotes a recording that did not chart or was not released in that territory.

=== Promotional singles ===
List of promotional singles, showing year released and album name
Title	Year	Album
"¿Dónde Está Santa Claus?"	2004	Maybe This Christmas Too?
"Carol of the Meows"	2004	Non-album singles
"Manifest Destiny/Sorority Tears"	2005	Non-album singles

== Other appearances ==
2004	"The Sun Shines Down on Me"	The Late Great Daniel Johnston: Discovered Covered
2006	"Memo to My Son"	Sail Away: The Songs of Randy Newman
2007	"This Wheel's on Fire"	Endless Highway: The Music of The Band
