= Erran Baron Cohen Presents: Songs in the Key of Hanukkah =

2008 studio album by Erran Baron Cohen

Studio album by Erran Baron Cohen
- Released: 8 December 2008
- Studio: Tel Aviv, Israel; London, United Kingdom; Berlin, Germany
- Genre: Hanukkah music; Jewish music; Klezmer; Hip hop; Electronica; Pop; Reggae; Tango
- Language: English; Hebrew; Ladino; Yiddish
- Label: WaterTower Records; New Line
- Producer: Erran Baron Cohen; Idan Raichel; Yasmin Levy; Y-Love; Jules Brookes

Erran Baron Cohen Presents: Songs in the key of Hanukkah is a studio album by British musician Erran Baron Cohen. It was released on 8 December 2008 through WaterTower Records and distributed by New Line Records. The album features guest appearances by Idan Raichel, Yasmin Levy, Y-Love, Jules Brookes, Avivit Caspi, and Dana Kerstein.

== Background ==
In an interview with NPR at the time of the album's release, Baron Cohen stated, "I remember from my childhood, listening to Hanukkah songs at home and ... to these children singing slightly out of key and some wonky old piano player to make a terrible record. The idea was to create a new concept in Jewish holiday music, something that everybody would enjoy listening to." Baron Cohen also expressed a desire to highlight the sometimes overlooked tragedy and historical background behind the holiday, stating, "It's quite a sad story, but also quite hopeful, it's about coming out of oppression, fighting tyranny, which are universal things that are very relevant for today."

== Track listing ==
1. "Hanukkah, Oh Hanukkah" (feat. Y-Love & Jules Brookes)
2. "Dreidel" (feat. Jules Brookes)
3. "Ocho Kandalikas" (feat. Yasmin Levy)
4. "Spin It Up" (feat. Jules Brookes)
5. "Look to the Light" (feat. Jules Brookes)
6. "Rock of Ages" (feat. Jules Brookes)
7. "Relics of Love and Light" (feat. Idan Raichel & Avivit Caspi)
8. "A la Luz de la Vela (In the Light of the Candle" (feat. Yasmin Levy)
9. "My Hanukkah (Keep the Fire Alive)" (feat. Y-Love & Dana Kerstein)
10. "Ma'oz Tzur" (feat. Dana Kerstein)
11. "Dreidel" (remix)
