= Shabbat Hanukkah =

Sabbath that falls during Hanukkah

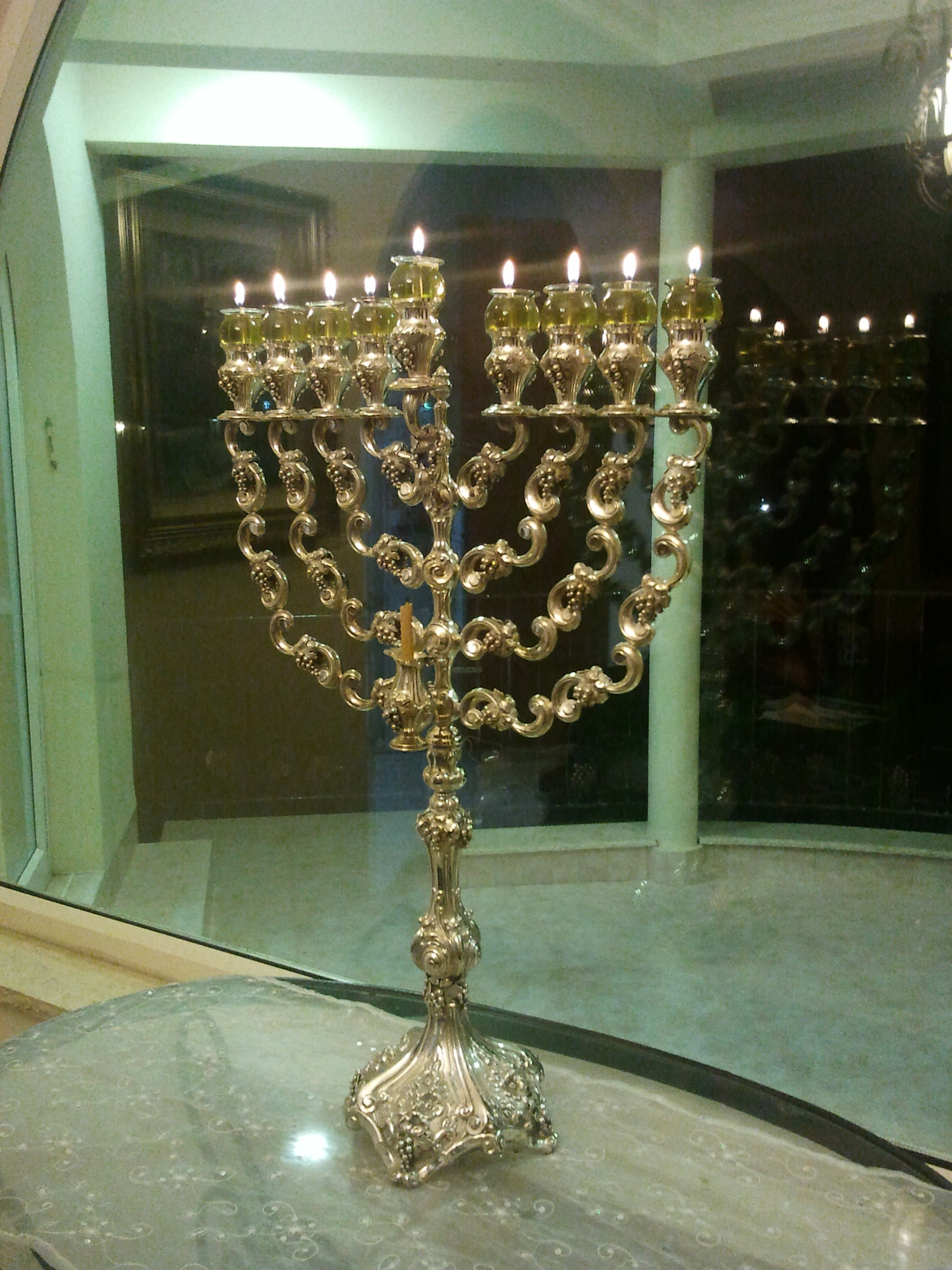
The eighth day of Hanukkah ("Zot Hanukkah") sometimes falls on a Sabbath.

Shabbat Hanukkah (Hebrew: שבת חנוכה) is the Shabbat that falls during the eight days of Hanukkah. It is one of the special Sabbaths of the Jewish year. At least one Sabbath falls within the festival every year, and two when Hanukkah begins on a Saturday.

Because kindling a flame is forbidden on the Sabbath, the Hanukkah lights are lit on Friday before the Sabbath candles, and on Saturday night only after the Sabbath ends; the order of the Hanukkah lights and Havdalah on Saturday night has been disputed since the Middle Ages. Al HaNissim is added to the Sabbath prayers, including Musaf.

Two Torah scrolls are used, the second for the Hanukkah reading from Numbers 7, and the haftarah is Zechariah's vision of the golden menorah, or, on a second Sabbath of Hanukkah, the account of the lampstands of Solomon's Temple. When the Sabbath coincides with Rosh Chodesh Tevet, three Torah scrolls are taken out and the Hanukkah haftarah takes precedence over that of the new month, a question that divided medieval authorities. Many piyyutim and table songs were composed for the day, among them Solomon ibn Gabirol's "Shene Zetim".

== Lighting the Hanukkah lights ==
The central mitzvah of Hanukkah is kindling the Hanukkah lights, normally done around sunset or nightfall. Kindling a flame is one of the categories of work forbidden on the Sabbath, so the lighting on Friday and on Saturday night has to be moved around the Sabbath itself. On Friday the lights are kindled earlier than on other nights, before the Sabbath begins. On Saturday night they are kindled only after the Sabbath has ended.

=== Friday afternoon ===
- Time. The Hanukkah lights are kindled on Friday before sunset and before the Sabbath candles, rather than at sunset or nightfall as on other days.
- Burning time. On other nights the lights need to burn for half an hour. On Friday they are lit well before dark, so they must contain enough oil, or be large enough candles, to keep burning until at least half an hour after nightfall.
- Minchah first. Several later authorities recommend praying the afternoon service (Minchah) before lighting, so that a mitzvah belonging to the Sabbath evening is not performed before the prayer belonging to Friday. If this is not possible, one lights first.
- Order of the lights. The Rishonim disagreed about which lights come first. One view gives precedence to the Sabbath candles, on the principle that a more frequent mitzvah comes before a less frequent one (tadir ve-she-eino tadir). The other view, found in Halachot Gedolot, requires the Hanukkah lights to be lit first, because kindling the Sabbath candles may itself constitute acceptance of the Sabbath, after which lighting would be forbidden. The Shulchan Aruch rules that the Hanukkah lights are lit first, and Joseph Karo gives exactly this reason in his Beit Yosef.

=== Saturday night ===
After the Sabbath ends there are two obligations, Havdalah and the Hanukkah lights, and their order is disputed. The Shulchan Aruch rules that in the synagogue the Hanukkah lights are kindled before Havdalah, and Moses Isserles (Rema) extends this to the home. The Taz argued at length that Havdalah should come first at home, since it is the more frequent mitzvah, and that lighting first does not prolong the Sabbath because kindling is itself forbidden on the Sabbath. The Meiri already recorded the dispute among the Rishonim, noting that the custom in his own region was to light first. In practice synagogues generally light first. At home both customs exist: David Zvi Hoffmann reported that German Jews followed the Taz, and the Aruch HaShulchan describes the same practice in Lithuania.

Many communities pray the evening service (Maariv) promptly on this Saturday night so that the lights can be kindled as early as possible. Those who normally end the Sabbath only at the later time associated with Rabbeinu Tam (72 minutes or more after sunset) are divided. Some authorities, including Shlomo Zalman Auerbach and Yosef Shalom Elyashiv, held that anyone who keeps that time only as a stringency should end the Sabbath at the earlier time on this night and light at once. Others hold that whoever follows Rabbeinu Tam should do so here as well, since kindling on the Sabbath is a biblical prohibition while the Hanukkah lights are a rabbinic obligation.

=== Sabbath lamp, Hanukkah lamp and Kiddush wine ===
The Talmud records a set of priorities attributed to Rava for a poor person who cannot afford every ritual item. A lamp for the Sabbath takes precedence over a Hanukkah lamp, because it brings peace to the household (shalom bayit). Rava then asked whether a Hanukkah lamp or wine for Kiddush should come first, and concluded that the Hanukkah lamp takes precedence because it publicizes the miracle (pirsumei nisa). The Shulchan Aruch codifies both rulings, and Isserles adds that the Hanukkah lamp also takes precedence over wine for Havdalah.

== Prayers and meals ==
Al HaNissim is recited in every Amidah during Hanukkah. The Talmud asks whether it is also said in the Sabbath Musaf, given that Musaf is offered for the Sabbath and not for Hanukkah, which has no additional sacrifice. The ruling, following Rabbi Yochanan, is that it is said in Musaf as well. The same question appears in Pesikta Rabbati, which also requires Hanukkah to be mentioned in the Musaf of the Sabbath and of the new month. The full Hallel is recited, as on every day of Hanukkah.

Yosef Hayyim, the Ben Ish Chai, wrote that one should serve more food than usual at the Sabbath meals of Hanukkah in order to publicize the miracle, particularly when the Sabbath is also the new month of Tevet.

== Torah reading ==
The regular weekly portion is not displaced. Two Torah scrolls are taken out: the weekly portion is read from the first, and the maftir reads the Hanukkah portion from the second, taken from the offerings of the tribal princes at the dedication of the Tabernacle in Numbers 7, corresponding to that day of the festival.

== Haftarah ==
The Talmud assigns "the lamps of Zechariah" to the Sabbath of Hanukkah, and "the lamps of Solomon" to the second Sabbath when there are two. Rashi identifies these as Zechariah 2:14–4:7, which contains Zechariah's vision of a golden menorah flanked by two olive trees, and 1 Kings 7:40–50, which describes the vessels, including the lampstands, that Hiram made for Solomon's Temple. This is also the ruling of Seder Rav Amram and the Shulchan Aruch, and it is the practice of most communities today. The Zechariah passage is also read on Shabbat Beha'alotekha.

Earlier sources from the Land of Israel show a different picture. Tractate Soferim assigns 1 Kings 7:51, on the completion of the Temple, as the haftarah of the Sabbath of Hanukkah, and the kedushta poems of Yannai and of Rabbi Yeshuah ben Joseph, an 11th-century judge in Alexandria, point to the same verse. Pesikta Rabbati contains homilies on three different haftarot for Hanukkah Sabbaths, and the poems of Eleazar Kalir suggest as many as five possible readings.

== Shabbat Rosh Chodesh Tevet ==
In some years 30 Kislev, the first day of Rosh Chodesh Tevet, falls on the Sabbath of Hanukkah, which is then always Parashat Miketz. The day combines the laws of the Sabbath, of Shabbat Rosh Chodesh and of Hanukkah. In the Grace after Meals three insertions are made: Retzeh for the Sabbath, Yaaleh Veyavo for the new month and Al HaNissim for Hanukkah.

It is one of the few occasions on which three Torah scrolls are used. Miketz is read from the first scroll in six aliyot instead of the usual seven, the sixth reader continuing to the end of the portion. The seventh reader reads the Rosh Chodesh passage (Numbers 28:9–15) from the second scroll, and the maftir reads the Hanukkah portion from the third. The order follows the principle that the more frequent obligation comes first. Tosafot add, in the name of Samson ben Abraham of Sens, that the Rosh Chodesh reading is placed second precisely so that the maftir, and therefore the haftarah, will belong to Hanukkah.

Half Kaddish is recited after the second reading, which completes the seven required aliyot. Ashkenazim place the third scroll on the bimah before that Kaddish so that it is said over both. Sephardim recite another half Kaddish after the third reading.

The haftarah is that of Hanukkah, not that of Shabbat Rosh Chodesh (Isaiah 66). This was not always settled. Tractate Soferim prescribes the Rosh Chodesh haftarah, and in 11th-century Mainz the question divided the students of Gershom ben Judah: Judah ha-Kohen and Rabbi David ruled for the Rosh Chodesh reading, while Isaac ben Judah ruled for Zechariah. Yehudai Gaon, Machzor Vitry and the Tosafists supported the Hanukkah reading, which was adopted by the Rosh, the Tur, Abudirham and the Shulchan Aruch, and is now universal.

== Piyyutim and zemirot ==
Shabbat Hanukkah was among the more festive Sabbaths of the year, and many piyyutim were written for it. Numerous kedushtaot, kerovot and yotzerot for the day survived in the Cairo Geniza but did not enter any established rite. European rites also had a large repertoire of poems for this Sabbath, though by the 21st century only a few communities still recite them. A machzor of the Maghrebi community that lived in Sicily, apparently close to the early North African rite, contains poems for Nishmat and the yotzer of Shabbat Hanukkah, among them two by Moses ibn Ezra. No community follows this custom today.

Poems inserted into the liturgy include:

- "Shene Zetim", a me'orah by Solomon ibn Gabirol placed before the conclusion of the blessing Yotzer ha-me'orot. It is recited in both Western and Eastern Ashkenazi rites, mainly on the first Sabbath of Hanukkah. It draws on Zechariah's menorah vision from the haftarah and prays for the restoration of the priesthood and the Davidic kingship, symbolized by the two olive trees. The tune now used for "Ma'oz Tzur" is believed to have first been sung to this poem.
- "Asher Yatzar Or", by Rabbi Ephraim of Regensburg, modelled on "Shene Zetim". It was adopted in the Eastern Ashkenazi rite for the second Sabbath of Hanukkah and for Shabbat Beha'alotekha.

Table songs (zemirot) for the day include:

- "Avnei Yekar", a short Hanukkah poem traditionally attributed to Abraham ibn Ezra, sung especially by Yemenite Jews.
- "Ikhlu Mashmanim", an anonymous song sung in some Ashkenazi and Hasidic communities. Some scholars attribute it to Ibn Ezra on the strength of the acrostic Avraham. Its subject matter drew criticism and some authorities opposed singing it, though Pinchas of Koretz is reported to have sung it on Shabbat Hanukkah.
