= Guster on Ice =

Live album by Guster

Live album by Guster
- Released: 18 May 2004
- Recorded: 2003
- Genre: Rock
- Label: Warner Reprise Video

Guster chronology
Live 12/13/03 Sayreville, NJ (2004)	Guster on Ice (2004)	Live 3/2/04 Lexington, KY (2004)

Professional ratings
Review scores
Source	Rating
Allmusic	4/5 stars

Guster on Ice - Live from Portland, Maine is a live album that was released by the band Guster in May 2004. It was recorded in December 2003 over two nights of concerts at the State Theatre in Portland, Maine. The DVD was directed by Danny Clinch.

== Track listing ==
=== Disc one (CD) ===
1. "Careful"
2. "Happier"
3. "Red Oyster Cult"
4. "Ramona"
5. "Barrel of a Gun"
6. "(Nothing But) Flowers" (Talking Heads)
7. "Come Downstairs and Say Hello"
8. "Demons"
9. "Amsterdam"
10. "I Spy"
11. "Airport Song"
12. "Homecoming King"
13. "Fa Fa"

=== Disc two (DVD) ===
1. "Careful"
2. "Fa Fa"
3. "I Spy"
4. "(Nothing But) Flowers" (Talking Heads)
5. "Ramona"
6. "Red Oyster Cult"
7. "So Long"
8. "Airport Song"
9. "Backyard"
10. "Happier"
11. "Barrel of a Gun"
12. "Come Downstairs and Say Hello"
13. "Homecoming King"
14. "Mona Lisa"
15. "What You Wish For"
16. "Amsterdam"
17. "Demons"
18. "Careful"
19. "Jesus on the Radio"
