= Christmas: A Season of Love =

Studio album by Idina Menzel
- Released: October 18, 2019
- Genre: Christmas
- Length: 54:59
- Labels: School Boy; Decca
- Producer: Ron Fair

Idina Menzel chronology
Idina (2016)	Christmas: A Season of Love (2019)	Drama Queen (2023)

Christmas: A Season of Love is the sixth studio album and second Christmas album by American singer and actress Idina Menzel. It was released through School Boy and Decca Records on October 18, 2019, and includes duets with Billy Porter, Menzel's Frozen costar Josh Gad, Ariana Grande and Menzel's husband Aaron Lohr.

== Composition ==
Menzel's duet with Grande, "A Hand for Mrs. Claus", released as the first promotional single of the album, is an original song by the composers of the Frozen soundtrack, Kristen Anderson-Lopez and Robert Lopez, while Menzel wrote the original song "At This Table" with Jonas Myrin about "inclusion during the holiday season". The album also features a solo recording of the Rent song "Seasons of Love" and the Ladino Hanukkah song "Ocho Kandelikas", which is preceded by a home recording of Idina with her son Walker during Hanukkah.

== Promotion ==
In promotion for the album, Menzel has embarked on a three-city concert tour set mainly on the East Coast, including a stop at New York City's Carnegie Hall.

== Track listing ==
Christmas: A Season of Love track listing
No.	Title	Writer(s)	Length
1.	"Sleigh Ride"	Leroy Anderson; Mitchell Parish	3:21
2.	"The Most Wonderful Time of the Year"	Edward Pola; George Wyle	3:04
3.	"I Got My Love to Keep Me Warm" (featuring Billy Porter)	Irving Berlin	4:04
4.	"Christmas Just Ain't Christmas"	Kenneth Gamble; Leon Huff	3:32
5.	"We Wish You the Merriest" (featuring Josh Gad)	Les Brown	2:26
6.	"A Hand for Mrs. Claus" (featuring Ariana Grande)	Robert Lopez; Kristen Anderson-Lopez	2:29
7.	"We Need a Little Christmas" (from Mame)	Jerry Herman	3:16
8.	"O Holy Night/Ave Maria (Schubert)" (medley)	Adolphe Adam; Placide Cappeau; John Sullivan Dwight; Franz Schubert; Adam Storck; Walter Scott	5:30
9.	"Winter Wonderland/Christmas (Baby Please Come Home)" (medley)	Felix Bernard; Richard B. Smith; Jeff Barry; Ellie Greenwich; Phil Spector	3:51
10.	"I'll Be Home for Christmas" (featuring Aaron Lohr)	Walter Kent; Kim Gannon	3:58
11.	"Walker's 3rd Hanukkah"	Idina Menzel	0:29
12.	"Ocho Kandelikas" (sung in Ladino)	Flory Jagoda	3:17
13.	"Christmas Time Is Here" (from A Charlie Brown Christmas)	Vince Guaraldi; Lee Mendelson	3:17
14.	"At This Table"	Menzel; Jonas Myrin	3:46
15.	"Seasons of Love" (from Rent)	Jonathan Larson	3:58
16.	"Caroling, Caroling"	Alfred Burt	2:50
17.	"Auld Lang Syne (Introduction)"	Menzel; Robert Burns	0:29
18.	"Auld Lang Syne"	Burns	1:22
Total length:			54:59

== Personnel ==
- Idina Menzel – lead vocals
- Walter Afanasieff – production, arrangements, keyboards
- Rob Mounsey – production
- William Ross – arrangements
- Jorge Calandrelli – arrangements
- Dave Metzger – arrangement of "A Hand for Mrs. Claus"
- David Reitzas – mixing
- Nathan East – bass guitar
- Vinnie Colaiuta – drums
- Paul Jackson Jr. – guitar
- Dennis Budimir – guitar
- Randy Waldman – piano
- Kenny G – saxophone
- Kent Smith – trumpet solo
- Josh Gad – vocal duet
- Ariana Grande – vocal duet
- Aaron Lohr – vocal duet
- Billy Porter – vocal duet
- Missi Hale – backing vocals
- Luke Edgemon – backing vocals
- Monét Owens – backing vocals
- Tyler Gordon – engineering, programming
- David Reitzas – engineering
- Adrian Bradford – engineering
- Tommy Vicari – orchestral engineering
- Larry Mah – orchestral engineering
- Courtney Blooding – production coordination
- Norman Wonderly – creative direction
- Ruven Afandor – photography

== Charts ==
Chart (2019)	Peak position
US Billboard 200	123
US Top Holiday Albums (Billboard)	2
