= A Season of Love Tour =

2019 concert tour by Idina Menzel

- Tour by Idina Menzel
- Associated album: Christmas: A Season of Love
- Start date: December 6, 2019
- End date: December 11, 2019
- No. of shows: 3 in North America

Idina Menzel concert chronology
- Bridges Tour (2018); A Season of Love Tour (2019)

A Season of Love Tour is a concert tour by actress and singer Idina Menzel in support of her second holiday album Christmas: A Season of Love. The tour is only performed in 3 cities on the East Coast of the United States.

== Background ==
On October 7, 2019, Menzel announced that she would perform a one night only concert at New York City's Carnegie Hall on December 11, 2019. The announcement came following the most prior announcement about her seventh studio album and second holiday album Christmas: A Season of Love. On October 9, 2019, Menzel announced two additional shows set for December 6, 2019 at Caesars Atlantic City in Atlantic City, NJ and December 8, 2019, at the Grand Theatre at Foxwoods Resort Casino in Mashantucket, CT.

== Synopsis ==
Menzel performs a selection of holiday favorites from holiday album Christmas: A Season of Love. In addition, Menzel performs selections from her breakout performances on Broadway in Wicked and Rent along with her Oscar-winning song Let It Go from Disney's Frozen.

== Special Guests ==
- Ron Fair (Conductor at all shows)
- Aaron Lohr (at all shows)
- Kristen Anderson-Lopez (at the New York City show only)
- Marlow Rosado (at the New York City show only)
- Billy Porter (at the New York City show only)
- The Girls from Menzel's A Broaderway Foundation Camp (at the New York City show only)

== Setlist ==
1. "Sleigh Ride" from Christmas: A Season of Love
2. "The Most Wonderful Time of the Year" from Christmas: A Season Of Love
3. "We Need a Little Christmas" from Christmas: A Season Of Love / Mame
4. "Do You Want to Build a Snowman?" from Frozen
5. "A Hand For Mrs. Claus" from Christmas: A Season Of Love
6. "I'll Be Home for Christmas" (duet with Aaron Lohr) from Christmas: A Season Of Love
7. "Ocho Kandelikas" from Christmas: A Season Of Love
8. "Defying Gravity" from Wicked
9. "Christmas Time Is Here" from Christmas: A Season Of Love
10. "O Holy Night"/"Ave Maria" from Christmas: A Season Of Love
11. "We Wish You The Merriest" from Christmas: A Season Of Love
12. "Christmas Just Ain't Christmas" from Christmas: A Season Of Love
13. "Let It Go" from Frozen
14. "I Got My Love to Keep Me Warm" from Christmas: A Season Of Love
15. "At This Table" from Christmas: A Season Of Love
16. "Into The Unknown" from Frozen 2

Encores

1. "Seasons of Love" from Christmas: A Season Of Love / Rent
2. "Auld Lang Syne" from Christmas: A Season Of Love

== Tour dates ==
Date	City	Country	Venue
North America
December 6, 2019	Atlantic City	United States	The Circus Maximus Theatre at Caesars Atlantic City
December 8, 2019	Mashantucket	United States	The Grand Theatre at Foxwoods Resort Casino
December 11, 2019	New York City	United States	Carnegie Hall
