= Los Serenos Sefarad =

- Origin: Seattle, Washington
- Genres: Jewish hip hop, Sephardic music, Judaeo-Spanish hip-hop
- Years active: 2014–present
- Members: Rabbi Simon Benzaquen; Alejandro "Alex" Hernandez; Netzaj Mendoza
- Website: Los Serenos Sefarad

Los Serenos Sefarad ("The Sefarad Watchmen") is an American Judaeo-Spanish-language Jewish hip hop group from Seattle, Washington. They were formed in 2014 by Rabbi Simon Benzaquen (vocals, songwriting), Alejandro "Alex" Hernandez (rapping, producer, guitar), and Netzaj Mendoza (producer). They released their debut album, Los Bilbilikos, in September 2017.

== History ==
Los Serenos Sefarad was formed in January 2014 by Moroccan-born Sephardic Rabbi Simon Benzaquen and Mexican-born rapper/guitarist Alejandro "Alex" Hernandez. Benzaquen, the former rabbi of Bikur Holim Congregation in Seattle's Seward Park neighborhood, was initially uninterested in hip hop but gained a deeper understanding while overseeing the conversion studies of rapper Nissim Black (formerly D. Black), and prominently collaborated with Black on his song "Sores" and several concerts. Hernandez had moved to Seattle from Chihuahua, Mexico. One of their first collaborations in 2013 was a rap version of the Ladino Hanukkah song "Ocho Kandelikas". Their first performances in Seattle were at Seward Park's SPARK Jewish Music Festival.

On November 9, 2015, the group released their first music video, "La Vida Do Por El Raki". In 2016, they released the songs "La Serena" (The Sentinel) and "Adyjo Keryda Espanya" (Goodbye My Beloved Spain), the latter written about the expulsion of Jews during the Spanish Inquisition on 1492.

== Discography ==
=== Albums ===
- Los Bilbilikos (2017)

=== Singles ===
- "La Vida Do Por El Raki" (2015)
- "La Serena" (2016)
- "Adyjo Keryda Espanya" (2016)

=== Music videos ===
- "La Vida Do Por El Raki" (2015)
