= Airport Song =

Single by Guster

from the album Goldfly
- Released: 1998
- Recorded: December 1996
- Genre: Rock
- Label: Hybrid
- Songwriters: Steve Lindsey, Adam Gardner
- Producer: Steve Lindsey

Guster singles chronology
"Airport Song" (1998)	"Demons" (1998)

"Airport Song" is the debut single by Guster, from their second album Goldfly. It also appears on the live CD and DVD Guster on Ice.

== Background ==
Like most of Guster's early work, percussion on the song is played with bongos, and the lyrics reference indoctrinating a new member into a cult.

During concerts, there is a tradition among fans to throw ping pong balls on stage during the song's climax.

== Charts ==
Chart (1998)	Peak position
US Alternative Airplay (Billboard)	35
