= DeLeon (band) =

American indie rock band

- Origin: New York, New York, United States
- Genres: Indie rock, Spanish, Ladino, fusion Sephardic Music
- Label: JDub
- Members: Daniel Saks, Kevin Snider, Andrew Oom, Amy Crawford, Justin Riddle
- Website: www.ilovedeleon.com

DeLeon is an indie rock band from New York that plays Sephardic folk songs in a modern context. The band is named for 12th century Kabalistic philosopher Moses de León and the great-grandfather of front man Daniel Saks, Giorgio DeLeon.

== History ==
DeLeon was formed in 2006, and first played live in April 2007 at the Bowery Ballroom, alongside Balkan Beat Box. DeLeon has toured with Os Mutantes, Gogol Bordello, Ozomatli, Mike Gordon and Balkan Beat Box. Dan Saks is also a member of The LeeVees and The Macaroons. DeLeon's self-titled album was released August 12, 2008 on JDub Records. Saks (vocals, guitar, banjo), along with band mates Kevin Snider (bass), Justin Riddle (drums), Amy Crawford (keyboard, melodica, glockenspiel) and Andrew Oom (trumpet, synth), wrote the songs that combine ancient Sephardic melodies sung in Ladino, Hebrew and English with modern rock, using guitars, horns and drums.

In 2012, Saks moved to Mexico City, where he recorded DeLeon's third LP, Tremor Fantasma. They released album independently because their former label JDub Records had dissolved. A second version of the band was assembled in Mexico City consisting of Dan Saks and as Mexico City natives Marina de Ita and Cynthia Martinez of Polka Madre, Rodrigo Barbosa of Paté de Fuá and Los Dorados, Fausto Palma of Petra and Strictly Personal and Dante Pimentel .
