= Dan Saks =

American author, musician, and podcaster (born 1978)

Daniel Adam Vitale Saks (born November 27, 1978) is an American author, musician, and podcaster. He is the creator of the children's music podcast Noodle Loaf and the author of children's picture and board books published by Penguin Random House.

== Career ==
=== Music ===
Early in his musical career, Saks performed under the pseudonym "Shank Bone Mystic" as a member of the hip hop/indie rock group Little-T and One Track Mike.

Saks later formed and fronted DeLeon, an indie rock band that performed modern adaptations of traditional Sephardic folk music sung in Ladino, Hebrew, and English. The group released its self-titled debut album on JDub Records in 2008.

Saks also joined the Hanukkah-themed rock band The LeeVees. In December 2023, the group performed on NPR Music's Tiny Desk Concerts series.

=== Children's media and writing ===
In 2018, Saks created Noodle Loaf, an interactive children's music podcast. The show earned a Common Sense Media Selection seal, was named an official Honoree in the Family & Kids category at the 2020 Webby Awards, and was featured by The New York Times as a recommended children's music podcast.School Library Journal has also highlighted the show and its adaptation into children's literature.

Saks has authored several children's books published by RISE x Penguin Workshop, an imprint of Penguin Random House. His board book series includes Families Belong (2020), Families Can (2021), Families Grow (2021), We Share This School (2023), and We Share This Neighborhood (2024), all illustrated by Brooke Smart. He has discussed his work on literary programs and podcasts, including Kansas Public Radio's The Kids' Bookshelf and Resolve New England Magazine.

In June 2026, Saks published his debut picture book, On Our Bikes, illustrated by João Fazenda. The book received positive coverage from BK Reader, which highlighted its connection to Brooklyn bike culture and his musical compositions.

== Bibliography ==
- Families Belong (Rise x Penguin Workshop, 2020)
- Families Can (Rise x Penguin Workshop, 2021)
- Families Grow (Rise x Penguin Workshop, 2021)
- We Share This Earth (Rise x Penguin Workshop, 2022)
- We Share This School (Rise x Penguin Workshop, 2023)
- We Share This Neighborhood (Rise x Penguin Workshop, 2024)
- On Our Bikes (Rise x Penguin Workshop, 2026)
