= Sarah Aroeste =

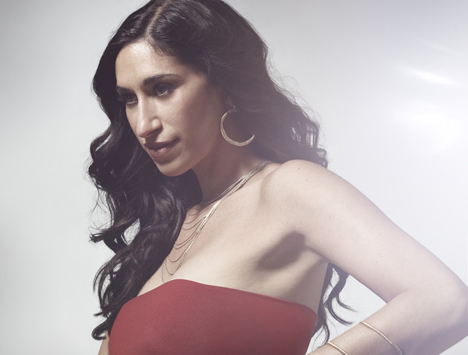

Background information
- Born: 1976 (age 49–50); Washington, D.C.
- Genres: Ladino music, Sephardic music, world fusion, indie rock
- Occupations: Singer, Composer, Author
- Years active: 2001–present
- Label: Aroeste Music
- Website: SarahAroeste.com

Sarah Aroeste is an American singer and composer. Her music is often referred to as "feminist Ladino rock." She also writes books for children with Sephardic themes.

== Early life ==
Aroeste grew up in Princeton, New Jersey. Her family roots can be traced to the formerly vibrant Sephardic Jewish community of Monastir (now known as Bitola, North Macedonia, Битола, Македонија) which was almost completely destroyed in the Holocaust. Her family immigrated to the United States from Monastir during the Balkan Wars in the early 20th century.

Aroeste trained in classical opera singing at Westminster Choir College and Yale University. She attended the Israel Vocal Arts Institute in 1997, first learning traditional Ladino songs while studying under Nico Castel.

== Career ==
=== Ladino beginnings ===
In the late 1990s, Aroeste was working for the Foundation for Jewish Culture in New York, where she created The New Jewish Musics Initiative. She was disappointed that, while there was a revival of Ashkenazi klezmer music at that time, there was no similar revival for Sephardic music. She started her own Judaeo-Spanish rock band in 2001. Born Sarah Silverman, she adopted her mother's maiden name when she began performing as a Ladino musician. Aroeste has been at the forefront of the contemporary Ladino music revival ever since.

=== A la Una and Puertas ===
Aroeste's first two albums, 2003's A la Una: In the Beginning and 2007's Puertas, were primarily Ladino updates of traditional Sephardic standards. The latter, produced by Grammy Award winner Frank London, was described as "traditional Ladino music updated with rock, funk and jazz."

=== Gracia ===
Aroeste's third album, Gracia, is named after Gracia Mendes Nasi, a 15th-century Jewish woman who helped Jews who had falsely converted to Catholicism in order to flee the Spanish Inquisition. Produced and arranged by Shai Bachar, it features the rapping of poet Vanessa Hidary, and its opening track samples from a 1971 speech by Gloria Steinem. Unlike her first two albums, many of the Ladino songs on Gracia are originals written by Aroeste. With this release, she "developed a style that borrows liberally from all sorts of unexpected places, from Santigold fusion-pop to gothic metal," while taking care to insure that "during these genre experiments the Ladino influences don’t disappear, but are integrated." Gracia has been labeled "the strongest case around for the ongoing relevance of Ladino music."

=== Ora de Despertar ===
Aroeste's fourth album is an all-original Ladino children's album, the only known contemporary recording of its kind. The songs teach simple concepts in Ladino and range in themes from learning about mealtimes to body parts to animals on a farm. The album won a coveted Parents' Choice Award for music. With this recording, Aroeste has been credited for helping to perpetuate Ladino culture for a new generation.

In July 2017 Aroeste released a bilingual illustrated children's book of the same name, as a companion to the recording.

=== Together/Endjuntos ===
Aroeste's fifth album is an all-original bilingual (Ladino/English) holiday album that cycles the Hebrew calendar.

=== Monastir ===
Aroeste's sixth album is a musical homage to the once-thriving Sephardic community of Monastir. It features 30 musicians from 5 countries, singing in 3 languages to honor the Macedonian Jewish community of Aroeste's family, destroyed in WWII. One of the songs in the album, Estreja Mara honors the memory of Estreya Ovadya, the Macedonian Jewish partisan from Monastir who died in battle against the Nazis in 1944. The album was selected as Best Jewish Album of the Year (2021) by Jewish media outlet, Alma.

=== Hanuká ===
Aroeste's seventh album is an all-Ladino recording of Hanuka songs old and new. Billboard named one of the tracks, a cover of "Ocho Kandelikas", as one of the eight great Hanukkah songs of 2021.

=== Savor ===
Aroeste's eighth concept album is a multi-sensory conversation between Sephardic music, food, and history. In partnership with Sephardic Chef Susan Barocas, Savor pairs ten Ladino songs about food with recipes and cooking videos by acclaimed female chefs who each works to preserve Sephardic culture in her work.

=== Orijinal (En Bivo) ===
Aroeste's ninth recording is a 25th anniversary album that includes original selections spanning her career and re-recorded live.

== Performances ==
For two decades, Aroeste has headlined music festivals all over the world. In 2008, she performed with the Jerusalem Symphony Orchestra as a finalist in Festiladino, the international competition of original Ladino songs. In 2014, Aroeste won the Sephardic Prize at the International Jewish Music Festival in Amsterdam, and in 2015 she represented the US in the International Sephardic Music Festival in Cordoba, Spain.

== Discography ==
=== Albums ===
- A la Una: In the Beginning (2003)
- Puertas (2007)
- Gracia (2012)
- Ora de Despertar (2016)
- Together/Endjuntos (2017)
- Monastir (2021)
- Hanuká (2021)
- Savor (2023)
- Orijinal (En Bivo) (2026)

=== Compilations ===
- Sephardic Music Festival, Vol. 1 – "Hija Mia (Tamir Muskat Remix)" (2010)
- Sephardic Music Festival, Vol. 2 – "Gonna Light" (feat. Y-Love) and "La Comida La Manana" (2012)

== Books ==
- Buen Shabat, Shabbat Shalom (Kar-Ben) (2020) Considered to be the first contemporary board book with Ladino words published by a mainstream publisher.
- Mazal Bueno! (Kar-Ben) (2023)
- Uno, Dos, Tres: A Sephardic Counting Book (PJ Publishing) (2025)
- Anyada Buena, Shanah Tovah (Kar-Ben) (2025)
- Bavajadas! That's Just Silly! (PJ Publishing) (2025)
