= Dave Schneider (musician) =

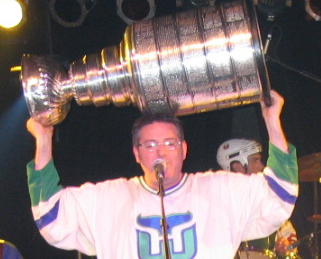

Background information
- Born: David Schneider; Trumbull, Connecticut
- Genres: rock music; indie rock; Hanukkah music
- Instrument(s): guitar, vocals
- Years active: 2005–present

Dave Schneider (born 23 April 1966) is a musician known for his work in the LeeVees and The Zambonis.

Schneider, who is Jewish, said he "grew up on the records of Allan Sherman, Woody Allen, and Mel Brooks and Carl Reiner" and wanted to create a Hannukah album that was funny as well as musically interesting. He and Adam Gardner created the album "Hanukkah Rocks" in 2005 and worked with Matisyahu on a collaboration in 2015.

Schneider was the on-ice MC for The Bridgeport Sound Tigers from 2001 to 2012.

Schneider plays a 1965 Gibson ES-335, a guitar that got seriously damaged by baggage handlers at an airport in Detroit in 2013. Delta Air Lines initially refused to pay in full for the repairs but eventually relented, and Gibson offered to do the repairs for free, and also offered Schneider a brand-new 50th anniversary reissue of a 1963 Gibson ES-335.

== Personal life ==
Schneider grew up in Trumbull, Connecticut. He is married and lives in Fairfield Connecticut and is the co-owner, with his father Robert, of Jimmy's Army-Navy in Bridgeport, Connecticut.
