= Amy Crawford (musician) =

American singer-songwriter

- Born: Amy Elizabeth Crawford
- Origin: Pacific Grove, California
- Genres: Pop rock, acoustic, indie, jazz
- Instruments: Vocals, keyboards, glockenspiel, melodica
- Years active: 2008–present
- Website: amycrawfordmusic.com

Amy Crawford is a songwriter, vocalist, keyboardist and producer originally from Northern California, and now living in Brooklyn, New York.

== Biography ==
As a solo artist Crawford has opened up for national acts including the Zac Brown Band, Wale, Bridget Kelly and K.Flay. She has also toured with the band DeLeon, opening for acts including Gogol Bordello, Ozomatli & Chali 2na, Phish bassist Mike Gordon and Os Mutantes. After meeting Sergio Dias, Crawford was invited to join Os Mutantes on keyboards and vocals for their 2012 and 2013 USA tours. In 2008 she received 3rd prize at the Shure/Montreux Jazz Festival International Jazz Vocal Competition. In 2007 she helped prepare parts and rehearse the children's choir for the Elton John concert & DVD production Elton 60: Live at Madison Square Garden. Her music has been licensed by MTV for the reality documentary series World of Jenks.

Crawford has composed music for and played keyboards on many pieces of music for television & advertising. She also works closely with noted composer/saxophonist Anthony Braxton and served as Assistant Producer on the recording of his opera "Trillium E" in 2010. She is a 2005 alumna of Wesleyan University in Connecticut, and won third place in the Shure Montreux Jazz Voice Competition of the 2008 Montreux Jazz Festival.

== Selected discography ==
=== Singles ===
- "Another Day," 2013
- "Weekend Girl," 2013
- "I Won't Tell," 2013
- "Down, Down, Down," 2013
- "Right & Left," 2013

=== EPs ===
- Amy Crawford & The Electric, 2009
