= Fa Fa =

Single by Guster

from the album Lost and Gone Forever
- Released: January 3, 2000
- Recorded: 1998
- Genre: Rock
- Length: 4:43
- Label: Hybrid
- Songwriter(s): Adam Gardner, Ryan Miller and Brian Rosenworcel
- Producer(s): Steve Lillywhite

Guster singles chronology
"Barrel of a Gun" (1998)	"Fa Fa" (2000)	"Happier" (2000)

"Fa Fa" is the second single from Guster's third studio album, Lost and Gone Forever. It is also on the live CD and DVD Guster on Ice. Karl Denson from the Greyboy Allstars plays the saxophone and flute on the song.

== Charts ==
Chart (2000)	Peak position
US Adult Alternative Songs (Billboard)	17
US Adult Pop Airplay (Billboard)	26
