= Goldfly =

Studio album by Guster
- Released: March 4, 1997
- Recorded: December 1996
- Genre: Rock
- Length: 42:11
- Label: Hybrid
- Producer: Steve Lindsey

Guster chronology
| Parachute (1994) | Goldfly (1997) | Lost and Gone Forever (1999) |

Professional ratings
Review scores
| Source | Rating |
|---|---|
| AllMusic | 3/5 stars |
| Pitchfork | 5.6/10 |

Goldfly is the second studio album by the rock band Guster, released in 1997. The album was recorded in December 1996 at the House of Blues Studios in Encino, California. It sold around 20,000 copies as an independent release, before being picked up by Sire Records. The Sire version was remixed by Mike Shipley.

There are three versions of the album. The original, rare, independently released version has the hidden song "Melanie" before the first song. The version released on Hybrid/Sire Records has the hidden song as the eleventh track. The third version, distributed to members of Guster's rep program, is a bad CD pressing of the album which contains "Melanie" as the first track, while "Getting Even" and "Bury Me" are combined as a single track.

== Track listing ==
All music is composed by Guster.

| No. | Title | Lyrics | Length |
|---|---|---|---|
| 1. | "Great Escape" | Ryan Miller | 3:06 |
| 2. | "Demons" | Miller; Phil Roy | 4:25 |
| 3. | "Perfect" | Miller; Roy | 4:23 |
| 4. | "Airport Song" | Adam Gardner; Steve Lindsey | 3:25 |
| 5. | "Medicine" | Miller | 3:56 |
| 6. | "X-Ray Eyes" | Miller; Roy | 3:27 |
| 7. | "Grin" | Miller | 4:17 |
| 8. | "Getting Even" | Miller | 4:43 |
| 9. | "Bury Me" | Miller | 2:35 |
| 10. | "Rocketship" | Miller | 4:01 |
| 11. | "Melanie" | | 3:48 |

== Personnel ==
Guster

- Adam Gardner – guitar, lead vocals
- Ryan Miller – guitar, lead vocals
- Brian Rosenworcel – percussion, background vocals

Additional musicians

- Davey Faragher – bass
- John Ferraro – drums
- Steve Lindsey – Hammond organ and Nord synthesizers
- Andy Happel – violin, string arrangements
- Rudy DiCello – cello

Technical personnel

- Steve Lindsey – producer
- David Schiffman – engineer, mixing
- Mike Shipley – additional mixes (1, 2, 4, 6)
- Leanne Unger – additional engineering
- Dave Bryant – additional engineering
- Andre Champagne – additional engineering
- Vic Anesini – mastering
