= Shawn Fogel =

American musician and singer-songwriter (born 1981)

Shawn Matthew Fogel
- Born: December 12, 1981 (age 44); New York City, New York, U.S.
- Origin: Amherst, Massachusetts
- Genres: Rock, Indie pop
- Occupations: Singer-songwriter, musician, audio engineer
- Instruments: Vocals, guitar, bass, piano, drums, harmonica, clarinet, saxophone
- Years active: 2004–present
- Labels: The Sleepy West
- Member of: The LeeVees; The Zambonis

Shawn Matthew Fogel (born December 12, 1981) is an American musician and singer-songwriter.

== Life ==
Shawn Matthew Fogel was born on December 12, 1981, in New York City. He began learning how to play music as a young child, picking up the piano in third grade. He continued to learn various other instruments through middle and high school, after which he enrolled in Hampshire College in Amherst, Massachusetts, where he studied songwriting, performance, audio engineering & studio recording, and music business. During his senior year at Hampshire, Fogel used the campus facilities to record, edit, and mix his first full-length album, Millions of Miles Away, all on his own. The album was released commercially in 2004. Fogel's next effort, One Day In The Desert - EP, was recorded with the record label The Sleepy West and released in late 2007. An accomplished multi-instrumentalist, Fogel sang all of the vocals and played all of the instruments on both albums; his talents cover a wide range of instruments, including the guitar, bass guitar, keyboard, harmonica, clarinet, saxophone, and drums.

Fogel also performs with The LeeVees, a New York City rock band that plays contemporary Hanukkah songs for whom Fogel plays bass guitar. Like the rest of the band members, Fogel maintains a strong Jewish identity, as he is also a songleader for the Garden Empire Region (GER) of the North American Federation of Temple Youths (NFTY).

Fogel is also a member of the world's only all hockey rock band The Zambonis. The Zambonis formed in 1991. Fogel joined in 2006.

Fogel claims his influences to be his mother's old Beatles LP's and Stevie Wonder, the latter of whom was specifically his inspiration to record his music in a one-man-band fashion.

== Discography ==
Fogel has recorded four albums, the first two of which are out of print.

Millions Of Miles Away

1. "Maybe Tonight" - 1:11
2. "Millions Of Miles Away" - 4:38
3. "Oh Yeah (How I Miss You)" - 3:09
4. "I'd Be Lyin'" - 2:47
5. "Walk It Off (Part I)" - 0:49
6. "Walk It Off (Part II)" - 1:58
7. "Everyone's Got Me Down" - 4:15
8. "It's You, My Love" - 3:37
9. "Days Go By" - 5:03
10. "Maybe Tonight Reprise" - 2:51

One Day In The Desert - EP

1. "The Season I Love Best" - 2:52
2. "Leaves, Corners, Stones" - 3:19
3. "What's Mine Is Mine" - 2:31
4. "Dead Petals" - 3:30
5. "Athens" - 6:01
