= Sephardic music =

Music of the Sephardic Jewish community

Sephardic music is an umbrella term used to refer to the music of the Sephardic Jewish community. Sephardic Jews have a diverse repertoire the origins of which center primarily around the Mediterranean basin. In the secular tradition, material is usually sung in dialects of Judeo-Spanish, though other languages including Hebrew, Turkish, Greek, and other local languages of the Sephardic diaspora are widely used. Sephardim maintain geographically unique liturgical and para-liturgical traditions.

Songs which are sung by women are traditionally sung while performing household tasks, without accompaniment or harmony. Tambourines and other percussion instruments are sometimes used, especially in wedding songs. Oud and qanún are also used in some instrumentations of Sephardic music, and more modern performers incorporate countless other imported instruments.

== History ==
Sephardic music has its roots in the musical traditions of the Jewish communities in medieval Spain and medieval Portugal. Since then, it has picked up influences from Morocco, Greece, Bulgaria, and the other places that Spanish and Portuguese Jews settled after their expulsion from Spain in 1492 and from Portugal in 1496. Lyrics were preserved by communities formed by the Jews expelled from the Iberian Peninsula. These Sephardic communities share many of the same lyrics and poems, but the melodies vary considerably.

Because so many centuries have passed since the expulsion, a lot of the original melodies have been lost. Instead, Sephardic music has adopted the melodies and rhythms of the various countries where the Sephardim settled in. The Greek and Turkish traditions are fairly close. The Moroccan or “western” Sephardic traditions are not that close to the eastern/Greek/Turkish traditions.

These song traditions spread from Spain to Morocco (the Western Tradition) and several parts of the Ottoman Empire (the Eastern Tradition) including Greece, Jerusalem, Armenia, the Balkans and Egypt. Sephardic music adapted to each of these locales, assimilating North African high-pitched, extended ululations; Balkan rhythms, (for instance in 9/8 time); and the Arabic maqam mode.

The song traditions were studied and transcribed in the early twentieth century by a number of ethnomusicologists and scholars of medieval Hispanic literature. From around 1957 until quite recently, Samuel Armistead (UC Davis) with colleagues Joseph Silverman and Israel Katz collected Judeo-Spanish songs from informants in North America, Turkey, the Balkans, Greece, North Africa, and Israel. The digitized recordings, with transcriptions and information about song type, are available on the website Folk Literature of the Sephardic Jews, now permanently hosted by the University of Illinois Library.

The early 20th century saw some popular commercial recordings of Sephardic music come out of Greece and Turkey, followed by recordings from Jerusalem and other parts of the Eastern Tradition. The first performers were mostly men, including the "Turks" Jack Mayesh, Haim Efendi and Yitzhak Algazi. Later, a new generation of singers arose, many of whom were not themselves Sephardic. Gloria Levy, Pasharos Sefardíes, Flory Jagoda the Parvarim, and Janet & Jak Esim Ensemble are popular Eastern Tradition performers of this period. Gerard Edery, Savina Yannatou, Stefani Valadez, Françoise Atlan, Marlene Samoun Yasmin Levy and Mara Aranda are among the new generation of singers bringing a new interpretation to the Ladino/Judeo-Spanish heritage and, in the large case of Levy and Edery, mixing it with Andalusian Flamenco. Opera singer and actor David Serero sings Ladino and Sephardic songs which he often includes in theater classics such as Merchant of Venice and Othello.

The Jewish Community of Thessaloniki Choir was founded in 1995 by members of the community. The choir was founded in the hope that the musical tradition that their ancestors took with them when they were expelled from the Iberian Peninsula 500 years ago would be preserved and revived. The research of its conductor 'Kostis Papazoglou' on Sepharadic music from the medieval tradition (songs like "Tres Ermanikas") and later as the music evolved resulted to a CD, produced by Minos EMI, with the participation of the Codex Ensemble, under the title " En la mar ay una torre." Today, this choir has 25-30 members of different ages. Its conductor Kostis Papazoglou, is an experienced and distinguished music teacher, soloist, and orchestras conductor, who has given concerts all over Greece as well as in Israel (Tel Aviv), Skopia, Vienna, Salzburg, Bulgaria (Sofia), Russia (St. Petersburg), Egypt (Cairo at the inauguration of the rebuilt Ben Ezra Synagogue), Turkey (Istanbul in the Ashkenaz Synagogue on the occasion of Jewish Culture Week), and Hungary (in the Great Budapest Synagogue).

== Instrumentation ==
Sephardic music, including pan-Sephardic music which may not necessarily be Judeo-Spanish, is primarily vocal. Instruments, when they are used, are played to accompany songs. the choice of Instruments used by Sephardim has generally reflected the instruments used in the host culture: (Greek, Ottoman, Moroccan, etc.) The instruments most commonly played are plucked lutes (fretless: oud, the Middle Eastern lute; and in what is now Turkey fretted saz or sometimes mandolin or the cumbus), the Assyrian kanun or santur (plucked or hammered Middle Eastern zither), violin and hand drums (frame and goblet).

For weddings and other celebrations, musicians might also be hired from the Muslim community, as skilled Jewish musicians are also hired by the Muslim community. Generally, Sephardic men played both local percussion and melody instruments, while women usually sang unaccompanied in domestic contexts, and at weddings, accompanying their singing with tambourines and sometimes other percussion instruments. Molho describes Sephardic women in Salonica using kitchen utensils as improvised percussion, in a manner reminiscent of Spanish and Portuguese village practice today. (Molho 2021) In the eastern Mediterranean, women musicians specializing in singing and drumming for weddings were known as tanyederas, and they played a central role in wedding events. Some early 20th-century Ottoman-area Jewish schools taught 'ud and mandolin to girls; and some women learned to play the piano. In any case, whether or not instruments are used, the main and always appropriate element in Sephardic music is the voice.

Sephardim, like other traditional musicians, often adapt traditional instruments to current norms; at a modern Sephardic wedding one will definitely not find any medieval instruments, but will likely hear an electronic keyboard.

== Composers ==
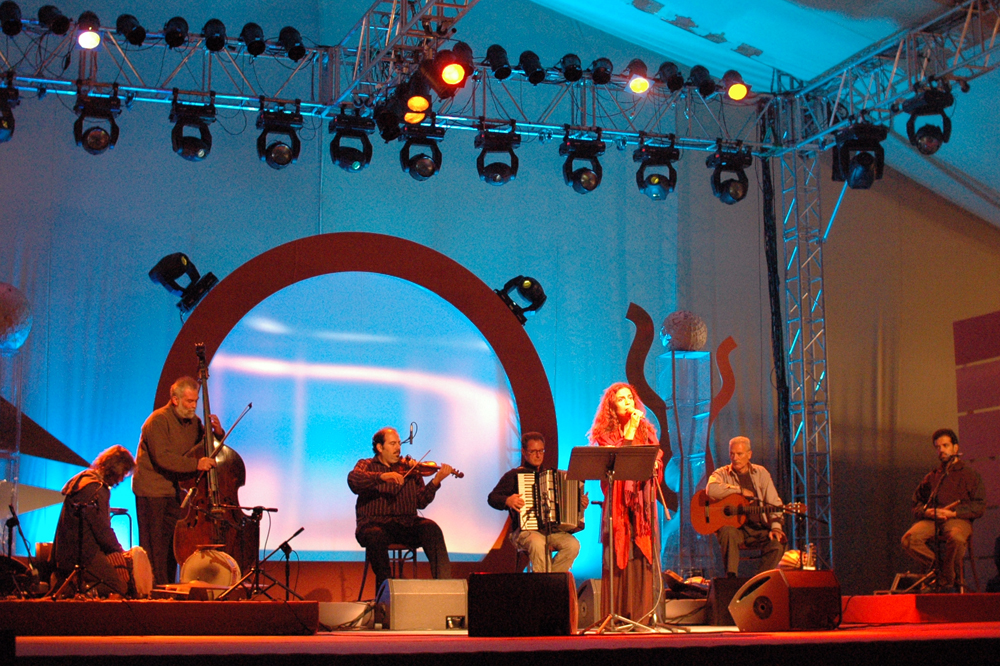
Sephardic ensemble Naguila from France and Morocco performing in Warszawa, September 2008.

From the sephardic music roots has grown a large corpus of original new classical music. Notable among modern composers are

- Flory Jagoda, who was known for her composition and interpretation of Sephardic songs and the Bosnian folk ballads.
- Yitzhak Yedid, who has written music mostly for chamber groups, strives to combine classical genres with improvisation on Sephardic roots and Arabic music. Yedid's composition 'Oud Bass Piano Trio' is a good example of this.
- Betty Olivero, who has taken traditional Jewish melodies – both Ashkenazic and Sephardic – and set them in complex, profoundly dissonant contexts. Her work "Serafim," for soprano, clarinet, violin, cello and piano is a good example of this.
- Tsippi Fleischer, who has composed vocal works that merge contemporary Western compositional techniques with the modal, quartertone scales of Arabic music.
- Marina Toshich, Bosnian-born Israeli contemporary composer and oud player who uses Sephardi elements from her homeland Bosnia. She has also published Oud educational books in USA (Mel Bays).
- Rabbi Simon Benzaquen from the Djudeo Espanyol Hip-Hop band Los Serenos Sefarad, who has composed rap lyrics to update Old Romanzas.

== Musicians ==
- Yasmin Levy (Israel)
- Nani Vazana (Netherlands)
- Ana Alcaide (Spain)
- Flory Jagoda (USA)
- Françoise Atlan (France)
- Mor Karbasi (Great Britain)
- George Dalaras (Greece)
- Glykeria (Greece)
- Los Serenos Sefarad (USA)
- Soledad Bravo (Venezuela)
- Esther Ofarim (Israel)
- Montserrat Figueras (Spain)
- Avishai Cohen (bassist) (Israel)
- Sarah Aroeste (USA)
- DeLeon (USA)
- Yitzhak Yedid (Israel)
- David Serero (France)
- La Mar Enfortuna (USA)
- Voice of the Turtle (USA)
- Dafné Kritharas (France)
- Lori Şen (Turkey)
- Mara Aranda (Spain)

== Discography ==
- Songs of the Sephardim: Traditional Music of the Spanish Jews by La Rondinella with Tina Chancey (Dorian Discovery, 1993)
- Spring in Salonica: Sephardic Popular Songs by Savina Yannatou and Primavera En Salonico (Lyra Records, 1996)
- "en la mar ay una torre" 19 Sephardic songs by the Jewish Community Choir of Thessaloniki, with the Codex ensemble under the direction of Kostis Papazoglou (Minos EMI)
- "The Sephardic Experience Volume 1-4", The Renaissance Players, Winsome Evans, Celestial Harmonies, 13166-2, 1998

== Sources ==
- Cohen, Judith. "Ladino Romance". 2000. In Broughton, Simon and Ellingham, Mark with McConnachie, James and Duane, Orla (Ed.), World Music, Vol. 1: Africa, Europe and the Middle East, pp 370–379. Rough Guides Ltd, Penguin Books. ISBN 1-85828-636-0
- Roda, Jessica. 2018. Se réinventer au présent. Les Judéo-espagnols de France. Famille, communauté et patrimoine musical. Presses universitaires de Rennes, ISBN 978-2-7535-6635-4
