= Hanukkah Rocks =

Studio album by The LeeVees
- Released: October 25, 2005
- Genre: Alternative rock
- Label: Reprise/Warner Bros. 49498
- Producer: Peter Katis

Hanukkah Rocks is a 2005 album by The LeeVees.

== Track listing ==
1. “Latke Clan”
2. “Apple Sauce vs. Sour Cream”
3. “Goyim Friends”
4. “At the Timeshare”
5. “How Do You Spell Channukkahh?”
6. “Kugel”
7. “Jewish Girls (at the Matzoh Ball)”
8. “Gelt Melts”
9. “Nun, Gimmel, Heh, Shin”
10. (Hidden track)
11. “Holiday”
