= The Zambonis =

American indie rock band

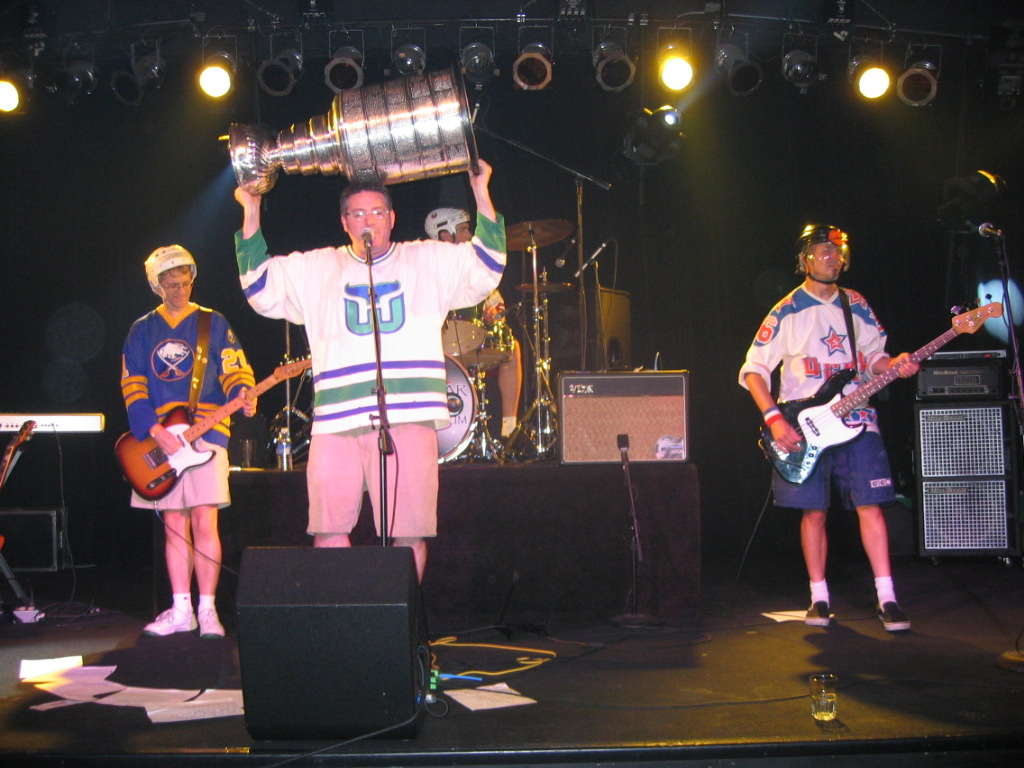
- The Zambonis

Background information
- Origin: Bridgeport, Connecticut, United States
- Genres: pop punk Indie rock
- Years active: 1991-present
- Label: Tarquin Records
- Members: Dave Schneider; Jon Aley; Mat Orefice; Tom Andrukevich; Shawn Fogel; Tarquin Katis; Cary Pollick; Peter Katis; Steve Tanski; Matt Gonzalez; Bob Anderson; Rich Dart
- Website: thezambonis.com

The Zambonis are an American indie rock band formed in 1991 by musicians Dave Schneider (The LeeVees), Peter Katis, Jon Aley. based in Connecticut. The Zambonis write songs exclusively about ice hockey. Schneider says of the band's musical style: “We’re the only band in the world whose two biggest influences are The Beatles and Wayne Gretzky!”

The NHL has commissioned the group to compose theme songs for the Boston Bruins and the Colorado Avalanche. The band has toured with the Stanley Cup and fundraised for Matt Cullen's organization, Cullen Children's Foundation.

In deference to the ice resurfacer and Frank Zamboni, the Zambonis are a licensee of the Zamboni Company.

== History ==
The Zambonis' debut album, 100% Hockey...and Other Stuff, was recorded at Tarquin Studios in Connecticut and was released in 1996. The 15-song disc cracked the Top 40 on the CMJ charts, and was added to the NHL, NCAA and minor league hockey arena playlists.

In October 1999, the band released its second full-length album, More Songs About Hockey...and Buildings and Food.

In 2002, the Zambonis opened the NHL All-Star Game along with Jewel and Five for Fighting.

In 2003, the Zambonis released a new album, Chippy Sessions, a compilation of rare live cuts, singles, and demos.

== Members ==
- Dave Schneider - guitar, bass, vocals
- Jon Aley - guitar, bass, keyboards, drums
- Mat Orefice - drums, vocals
- Tom Andrukevich - bass, guitar, vocals
- Shawn Fogel - guitar, bass, keyboards, sax, vocals
- Tarquin Katis - bass, hardcore vocalist
- Peter Katis - producer, guitar, drums, vocals
- Steve Tanski - guitar, bass, vocals
- Cary Polick - guitar, vocals
- Matt Gonzalez - Hockey Monkey
- Bob Anderson - Drums
- Rich Dart - Drums

== In popular media ==
In 2000, the Zambonis' single "Hockey Monkey" (co-written by cartoonist James Kochalka) was featured in the Mr. Wong episode "Meet the Creep, Pt. 2".

In 2002, four Zambonis songs (Breakaway, Slapshot Man, Shot Score, and Hockey Monkey) were featured in the Midway video game NHL Hitz 20-03.

In March 2006, the Zambonis' single "Hockey Monkey" (co-written by cartoonist James Kochalka) was chosen by Fox as the theme song to a new sitcom called The Loop.

== Discography ==
=== Albums ===
- 100% Hockey...and Other Stuff (1996)
- More Songs About Hockey...and Buildings and Food (1999)
- To Bleed Black and Gold (2000)
- Chippy Sessions (2003)
- Greatest Hits (2007, Nettwerk)
- Fight On The Ice (2008)
- Five Minute Major (in d minor) (2012)

=== Singles/EPs/Compilations ===
- "Away Game/Referee's Daughter/Shot Score " (1995)
- "Play-Off Fever EP " (1997)
- "Avalanche" (1997, split single with Lazerboy)
- "Tarquin Records Holiday Extravaganza" (1997 compilation)
- "Red Roses For Me" (2000, compilation)
- "Greasy Kid Stuff" (2002, compilation)
- Split EP with Harry and the Potters (2006, split EP)
- "Up End Atom" - Atom and His Package Tribute (2009 compilation)
