= Lost and Gone Forever =

Studio album by Guster
- Released: September 28, 1999
- Recorded: 1998
- Genre: Rock
- Length: 43:57
- Labels: Hybrid, Sire
- Producer: Steve Lillywhite

Guster chronology
Goldfly (1997)	Lost and Gone Forever (1999)	Keep It Together (2003)

Singles from Lost and Gone Forever
- 1. "Barrel of a Gun" Released: 1998; 2. "Fa Fa" Released: January 3, 2000; 3. "Happier" Released: 2000

Professional ratings
Review scores
Source	Rating
AllMusic	3/5 stars
Rolling Stone	3/5 stars
Sputnikmusic	5/5 stars

Lost and Gone Forever is the third studio album by the band Guster, released in September 1999. It was recorded earlier that year in Sausalito, California, and Bearsville, New York. In 1999, Ryan Miller claimed that Guster took the album's title "from the popular folk song 'Oh My Darling, Clementine'" and "chose it because we felt it reflected the lyrical content of the record." According to Guster's own website, other titles considered for the album included (jokingly) "The Ides of Guster", "When Guster Attacks", "Senior Week" and "Book on Tape". All of the drums on this album were played by hand (no sticks).

In February 2012, Paste magazine named Lost and Gone Forever the 79th greatest album of the 1990s.

== Track listing ==
All songs written by Ryan Miller.

No.	Title	Length
1.	"What You Wish For"	3:51
2.	"Barrel of a Gun"	3:11
3.	"Either Way"	4:43
4.	"Fa Fa"	4:43
5.	"I Spy"	2:57
6.	"Center of Attention"	4:07
7.	"All the Way up to Heaven"	5:00
8.	"Happier"	3:52
9.	"So Long"	2:38
10.	"Two Points for Honesty"	3:32
11.	"Rainy Day"	5:23

== Personnel ==
Guster

- Adam Gardner – vocals, guitar, bass guitar, trumpet
- Ryan Miller – vocals, guitar, piano, organ, harmonica
- Brian Rosenworcel – drums, percussion, trombone, typewriter

Guest musicians

- Karl Denson – flute, saxophone (on "Fa Fa")
- Tony Levin – bass guitar (on "Fa Fa" and "Rainy Day"), Chapman stick (on "Two Points for Honesty")
- Chris Manning – bass guitar (on "What You Wish For" and "Barrel of a Gun")
- Page McConnell – theremin (on "All the Way up to Heaven")
- Dan Rieter – cello (on "Either Way" and "So Long")
- Tracy Silverman – violin, viola (on "Either Way)
- Alicia Berger – whistling (on "All the Way up to Heaven")
- Chonie De Ocampo – whistling (on "All the Way up to Heaven")
- Katherine Forgacs – whistling (on "All the Way up to Heaven")
- Emily Martinez – whistling (on "All the Way up to Heaven")
- Kristen Randall – whistling (on "All the Way up to Heaven")
- Lisa Williams – whistling (on "All the Way up to Heaven")

== Charts ==
Chart (1999)	Peak position
US Billboard 200	169
