= Marvin Casey =

- מרווין קייסי
- Born: St. Louis, Missouri, United States
- Occupations: Dancer, Choreographer, Dance Instructor
- Spouse: Oshrat Kidron-Casey
- Children: 3
- Parent(s): Marvin Louis Casey Sr., Betty Olivia Casey
- Relatives: Christie Casey (sister)

Marvin Louis Casey II (Hebrew: ישראל משה קייסי or 'מרווין; born 1981 in St. Louis) is an Israeli-American hip-hop dancer, choreographer, and dance instructor. He is recognized for his contributions to dance and his unique journey from St. Louis, Missouri, to Israel.

== Biography ==
Marvin Casey was born in St. Louis Missouri in 1981 and was involved primarily with baseball, football, and tae kwon do until he started dancing at the age of 17. He became further immersed in it at age 22 while working for Utopia entertainment company, dancing hip-hop on the dance floor almost every night. He converted to Judaism in 2003, and immigrated to Israel in 2006. He was married in Jerusalem on October 31, 2010. and lives with his wife, Oshrat, and 3 children in Ashkelon, Israel.

== General references ==
- Eli Levine, "Marvin’s Dance", Aish.com, March 16, 2014
- Danna Harman, The Jewish African-American Who Brought Flash Mob Dancing to Israel, Haaretz, September 23, 2013
- Yael Brygel, Cityfront: Dancing to a Different Tune, The Jerusalem Post, June 4, 2009
- Leah Hakimian How Marvin met Oshrat, The New York Jewish Week, December 5, 2010
