= The LeeVees =

US musical ensemble

- Origin: New York City
- Genres: Rock
- Labels: Reprise/Warner Bros. Records/JDub Records
- Members: Adam LeeVee (Adam Gardner); David LeeVee (Dave Schneider); Michael LeeVee (Michael Azerrad); Shawn LeeVee (Shawn Fogel); DeLeon (Daniel Saks)
- Website: TheLeeVees.com

The LeeVees are a rock band from New York City featuring Adam Gardner of Guster and Dave Schneider of the Zambonis. The band was formed when the two bands toured together. The latter band only writes songs about ice hockey. Gardner and Schneider thought it would be fun to form another rock band, a Jewish one, that only wrote songs about Hanukkah, because there was a dearth of contemporary songs about that holiday. It first came to prominence near the end of 2005 with its debut album, Hanukkah Rocks. After realizing its initial approach was rather narrow, it continues as a band with a strong Jewish identity. Hanukkah Rocks producer Peter Katis had previously worked with Guster, as well as a range of indie-rock acts.

== Members ==
- Adam LeeVee (Adam Gardner) – vocals, guitar
- David LeeVee (Dave Schneider) – vocals, guitar
- Michael LeeVee (Michael Azerrad) – drums
- Shawn LeeVee (Shawn Fogel) – bass
- Shank LeeVee (Daniel Saks) – keyboards, banjo

== Discography ==
- Hanukkah Rocks (Reprise/Warner Bros. Records, 2005)
- "Outside of December" - single (Amazon, 2015)
