= Shene Zetim =

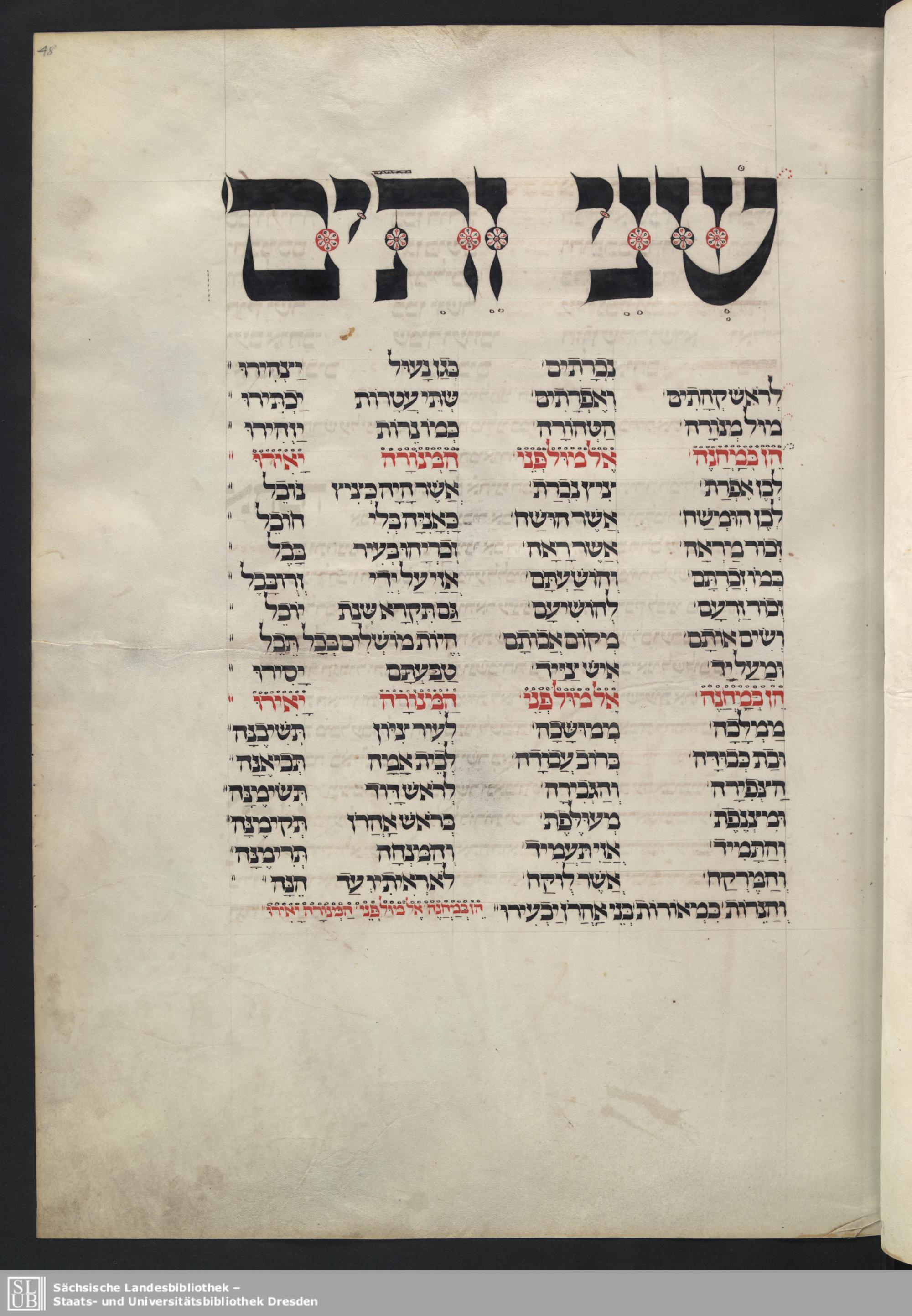

"Shene Zetim" (Hebrew: שני זיתים) is a piyyut (liturgical poem) by Rabbi Solomon Ibn Gabirol of the Me'orah type, intended to be recited as part of the blessing of Yotzer ha-me'orot. The piyyut is customary recited on the Sabbath of Chanukkah in both Western and Eastern Ashkenazic rites.

The piyyut focuses on the golden menorah, especially the menorah mentioned in the vision of the prophet Zechariah (chapter 4), which appears in the haftarah for the sabbath of Chanukkah. The content of the piyyut revolves around the plea for redemption, and for the return of the priesthood and the kingdom of the House of David. The priesthood and kingship are referred to as "Shene Zetim'" (two olive trees) based on the interpretation of the two olive trees in the prophecy of Zechariah.

== Customs of reciting the piyyut ==
In the early days of Ashkenazic piyyut, "Me'orot" were not recited, and the early Ashkenazic poets did not write such piyyutim in their compositions (similar to the "Ahavah," "Mi Khamokha," and "Ge'ulah" piyyutim). In later generations, influenced by the Sephardic piyyut, Ashkenazi Jews incorporated several Spanish "Me'orot" into their prayers, including this one.

It is customary in Western and Eastern Ashkenazi communities to recite this piyyut on Shabbat Chanukah, particularly on the first Shabbat. In Mainz, it is also recited on the second Shabbat of Chanukah, and in Posen it was recited on Shabbat Behaalotecha.

In the Romaniote tradition, generally only piyyutim like "Yotzer," "Ofan," "Zulat," and "Mi Khamokha" were recited, not "Me'orah" piyyutim. For this reason, in the Romaniote printed prayer book, the piyyut "Shene Zetim" is presented as the "Ofan" for Shabbat Chanukah and not as "Me'orah."
