= Steve Lindsey =

American music producer

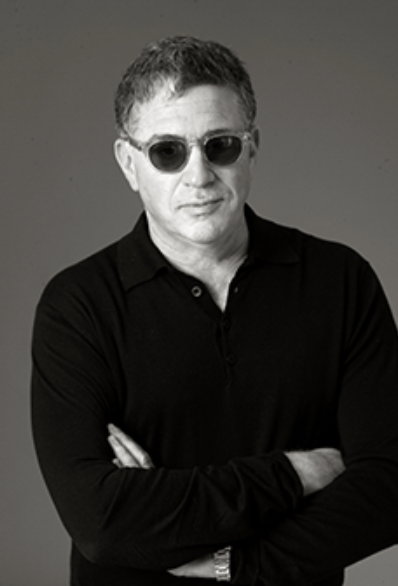
- Steve Lindsey pictured in 2013
- Born: May 6, 1956 (age 70); New York City
- Occupations: Composer, record producer

Steve Lindsey (born Steve Clark Lindsey; May 6, 1956) is an American record producer, songwriter music publisher and music industry executive.

== Early life ==
Steve Lindsey, born in New York City, to Mort Lindsey and his wife Judy. He had a connection to music from an early age and began playing piano at the age of five. Lindsey's father, Mort, was a conductor and composer who worked with Judy Garland, Barbra Streisand and Merv Griffin.

Lindsey's family moved to Malibu, California, when he was fifteen. He attended Santa Monica High School, and during his time there, played in local bands. He befriended session musicians, including David Paich and Bob Glaub, from the Los Angeles studio scene.

== Career ==
In his mid-20s, Lindsey built a studio at his Ocean Park home, and began making demos for artists such as Allee Willis, Brenda Russell, and Julie Brown.

Lindsey's first professionally released song which he wrote and produced was "Trapped in the Body of a White Girl" for Julie Brown, on Sire records, followed by "Hot Dog" for Martini Ranch. Within a few years Lindsey was an in-demand session keyboard player, writer and producer, and became the full-time associate producer for Richard Perry from 1986 to 1991. Under Perry, he worked on albums by The Pointer Sisters, Elton John, Luther Vandross, Randy Travis, Chaka Khan, and Ray Charles. Moonlighting under Perry, Lindsey produced Marvin Gaye's last top 10 single "My Last Chance" as well, as songs for The Temptations and Alexander O’Neal.

== Producer, publisher and songwriter ==
He left Perry to produce Leonard Cohen's album The Future, and four Aaron Neville albums at A&M, including The Grand Tour and Soulful Christmas. He later produced a song “Just Walk Away”, from Celine Dion's album, The Colour of My Love. He executive produced Leonard Cohen's Tower of Song album, for A&M, which included performances by Peter Gabriel, Willie Nelson, Trisha Yearwood, Aaron Neville and Elton John. For Elton John’s Duets album, he produced songs "Born To Lose" by Elton John and Leonard Cohen, as well as "I'm Your Puppet" by Elton John and Paul Young. In 1997, he produced Guster’s album Goldfly, and in 2005, produced Chris Botti’s breakthrough album A Thousand Kisses Deep.

In 1994, he started Blotter Music with Windswept, a publishing company in Los Angeles California. Through Blotter, he published, signed and developed an array of talent, including Bridget Benenate ("Breakaway" sung by Kelly Clarkson), Mickey Avalon, Mike Elizondo and Benji Hughes. During that time, Lindsey also taught Dr. Dre piano and music theory for four years.

In 2004, he started West Side Independent publishing, one of the four sides of the Independent Publishing Group, with Cameron Strang. They signed and developed J.R. Rotem, Bruno Mars and Brody Brown. Brown and Mars later wrote the songs "Grenade" and "Fuck You". Cameron Strang has since become chairman and CEO of Warner Chappell Music with whom Lindsey has exclusive joint ventures: Thou Art The Hunger and Mod Junkie. To date, Lindsey has sold over 100 million records as a publisher.

Lindsey wrote and produced the song, "Welcome to Burlesque", performed by Cher in the Screen Gems movie Burlesque (2010).

Currently, Steve has a venture with Hans Zimmer and Steve Kofsky at Remote Control Productions. His labels A-Tone Recordings and El Dorado have 150 high quality albums that have been licensed thousands of times and are distributed exclusively through Extreme Music.

== Music supervision and teaching ==
Lindsey supervised the Aaron Ryder films, My One and Only, House at the End of the Street, M.U.D., and "The Founder".

He taught a music supervision class at UCLA, and is a professor at Loyola Marymount University. He also lectures at the Musician's Institute, in Los Angeles.

He resides in Beverly Hills, California.
