= Flory Jagoda =

Bosnian-American musician (1923–2021)

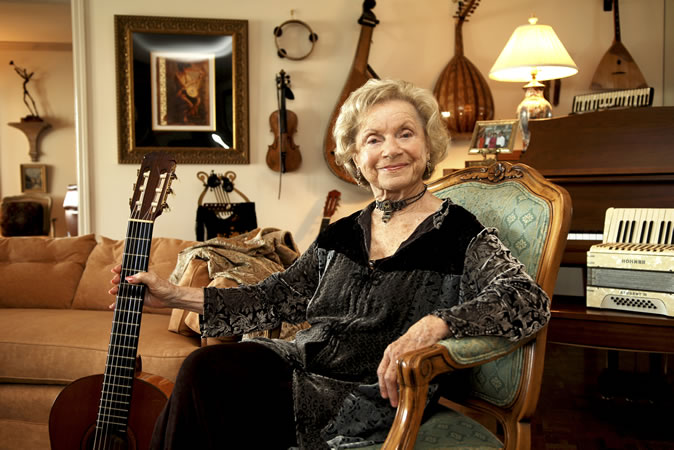
- Jagoda in 2002
- Born: Flora Papo; December 21, 1923; Sarajevo, Kingdom of Yugoslavia
- Died: January 29, 2021 (aged 97); Alexandria, Virginia, U.S.
- Occupations: Musician, singer-songwriter
- Spouse: Harry Jagoda (m. 1945; died 2014)
- Children: 4
- Honors: National Heritage Fellow – 2002; US Immigrant Achievement Award
- Musical career
- Genres: Ladino; Sephardic music; Sevdalinka
- Instruments: Guitar, vocals, accordion

Flory Jagoda (born Flora Papo; December 21, 1923 – January 29, 2021) was a Bosnian–born American guitarist, composer and singer-songwriter. She was known for her composition and interpretation of Sephardic songs, Judeo-Espanyol (Ladino) songs and the Bosnian folk ballads, sevdalinka. Her most famous song is the Hanukah standard, "Ocho Kandelikas."

== Biography ==
Flory Jagoda was born Flora Papo on December 21, 1923, to a Bosnian Jewish family. She grew up in the Bosnian towns of Vlasenica and her birth city of Sarajevo. She was raised in the Sephardic tradition, in the musical Altarac family. Her mother, Rosa Altarac, left her first husband and returned to the town of Vlasenica. There she met and married Michael Kabilio, and they settled in Zagreb, Croatia, where Kabilio owned a tie-making business.

When the Nazis invaded Yugoslavia in April 1941, her step-father (whom Flory referred to as her father), with the assistance of a gentile neighbor (who put her own life and her family's at risk by doing so), put 16-year-old Flory on a train to Split using false identity papers and removing the Jewish star from her coat. On the train she played her accordion ("hamonika" in Serbo-Croatian) all the way to Split (at that time controlled by the Italians), with other passengers and even the conductor singing along; she was never asked for her ticket. Her parents joined her in Split several days later, and after a brief sojourn there they and other Jews who had escaped the Nazis were moved to various islands off the Croatian coast. Flory and her parents were sent to the island of Korčula, where they lived until fall 1943. Following the Italian capitulation, Jews on Korcula left by fishing boats for Bari, Italy, which had recently been liberated by the British army. While in Italy, she met and fell in love with an American soldier named Harry Jagoda. She arrived in the United States as a war bride in 1946, going first to Harry's hometown of Youngstown, Ohio, and later moving to Northern Virginia.

Jagoda occasionally performed with her daughter, Lori Jagoda-Lowell; a 2003 review of Flory Jagoda and Friends at the Clarice Smith Center listed Lori among the featured performers.

Flory and her husband, Harry Jagoda, had four children: Betty Jagoda Murphy, Lori Jagoda Lowell, Andy Jagoda, and the late Elliot Jagoda.

The Sephardic community of Sarajevo and its surrounding communities were nearly obliterated during World War II.

Jagoda's recording Kantikas Di Mi Nona (Songs of My Grandmother) consists of songs her grandmother, a Sephardic folksinger, taught her as a young girl. Following the release of her second recording, Memories of Sarajevo, she recorded La Nona Kanta (The Grandmother Sings), songs she herself wrote for her grandchildren.

In her 90s, Jagoda has stated that Arvoliko: The Little Tree, released in 2006, would be her final solo recording. The tree, located in Bosnia, is said to be the only marker of the mass grave of 42 massacred members of the Altaras family. She referred to her four recordings as representing the four musical stages of her life. In 2006 she also released a series of duets with Ramón Tasat, Kantikas de amor i vida: Sephardic Duets.

Ladino, or Judeo-Espanyol, the language of the Sephardim, is in danger of extinction, but it is experiencing a minor revival among Sephardic communities, especially in music. Jagoda was a leader in this revival.

In 2002, Jagoda received a National Heritage Fellowship from the National Endowment for the Arts for her efforts in passing on the tradition of Sephardic songs sung in Ladino. In 2002, Ankica Petrovic produced a documentary film about her life. In the fall of 2013, a gala celebration concert honoring Flory's 90th birthday was held in Coolidge Auditorium at the Library of Congress. Jagoda was joined on stage by more than twenty of her students, colleagues, and family members. The concert was filmed by JEMGLO, which used portions of the concert interspersed with interviews with Jagoda, her family members, and several of her disciples and musical colleagues for the documentary Flory's Flame. Her music is known and sung by many musicians around the world, but especially by her apprentice, Susan Gaeta, as a soloist and with Trio Sefardi (with Tina Chancey and Howard Bass), and by her student, Aviva Chernick.

The 2019 children's book The Key from Spain by Debbie Levy is a tribute to Jagoda's life and music.

Flory and her husband, Harry Jagoda, had four children. In later life, Jagoda developed dementia and was unable to sing. Flory Jagoda died age 97 on January 29, 2021.

== Discography ==
=== Albums ===
- Kantikas Di Mi Nona (Songs of My Grandmother) (1988)
- Memories of Sarajevo
- La Nona Kanta (1992)
- Arvoliko (2006)
- Kantikas de amor i vida: Sephardic Duets (2006) Duets with Ramón Tasat

=== Video ===
- Petrovic, Ankica; Livingstone, Mischa (2002). The Key From Spain: The Songs and Stories of Flory Jagoda. (documentary)
- Fissel, Curt; Friedland, Ellen (2014). Flory's Flame. JEMGLO. (documentary)

== Bibliography ==
- Jagoda, Flory (1993). The Flory Jagoda Songbook: Memories of Sarajevo. New York: Tara Publications.

== See also ==
- Judaeo-Spanish
- Sephardic Jews
- "Ocho Kandelikas"
