= Ma'oz Tzur =

Jewish liturgical poem

"Ma'oz Tzur" (Hebrew: מָעוֹז צוּר, romanized: Māʾōz Ṣūr) is a Jewish liturgical poem or piyyut. It is written in Hebrew, and is sung on the holiday of Hanukkah, after lighting the festival lights. The hymn is named for its Hebrew incipit, which means "Strong Rock (of my Salvation)" and is a name or epithet for God in Judaism. It is thought to have been written sometime in the 13th century, although recent research suggests the 12th century. It was originally sung only at home, but has been used in the synagogue since at least the 19th century. In more recent years, of its six stanzas sometimes only the first stanza is sung (or the first and fifth).

== Time and author ==
"Ma'oz Tzur Yeshuati" is commonly thought to have been written in the 13th century, during the Crusades. The first letters of the first five stanzas form an acrostic of the composer's name, Mordechai (the five Hebrew letters מרדכי). There are several hypotheses regarding his identity. He may have been the Mordecai ben Isaac ha-Levi who wrote the Sabbath table-hymn "Mah Yafit". Judging from the appeal in the closing verse, he may have been the Mordecai whose father-in-law was martyred at Mainz massacre in 1096 as part of the First Crusade.

Avraham Fränkel suggests it was composed in Germany between 1160 and 1190.

Some argue that the sixth stanza is an original part of the poem and was removed due to concerns of creating conflict with non-Jews, while others argue that it is a late addition.

== Content ==
The hymn retells Jewish history in poetic form and celebrates deliverance from four ancient enemies, Pharaoh, Nebuchadnezzar, Haman and Antiochus. Like much medieval Jewish liturgical poetry, it is full of allusions to Biblical literature and rabbinic interpretation. Thus, malchut eglah denotes Egypt (Jeremiah 46:20); noges is Nebuchadnezzar; y’mini is Mordechai (Esther 2:5); y’vanim is Antiochus; shoshanim is the Jewish people (Shir HaShirim 2:2); b’nei vinah are the rabbinic sages; and shir refers to the Hallel psalms.

A second acrostic is found in the first letters of the opening words of the final stanza, the acrostic contains the word hazak (Hebrew: חזק, meaning "be strong").

The four middle stanzas refer to the salvations from the four persecutions of the Jewish people: The Exodus from Egypt, the end of the Babylonian captivity, escaping the persecution in Persia by Haman (the miracle of Purim according to the Book of Esther) and the successful revolt against the Greek rule in Syria during the Hasmonean period, as commemorated by Hanukkah.

The first and last stanzas are written in the present tense. The first expresses hope for the rebuilding of the Temple and for the defeat of enemies, who are metaphorically referred to as barking (menabe'ah).

The final stanza once again calls for divine retribution against the enemies of the Jewish people. The term Admon, meaning "the red one", was understood by some to refer to the emperor, Friedrich Barbarossa, whose name means Frederick "Redbeard". It was speculated that it was a later addition; at least it was not found in print up to the 18th century. It is suggested that the stanza was passed only in oral tradition as self-censorship due to its strong anti-Christian hints.

== Tune ==
Radomsk Hasidic Ma'oz Tzur sheet music. Former Chief Rabbi Yonah Stenzel

The bright and stirring tune now so generally associated with "Ma'oz tzur" serves as the "representative theme" in musical references to the feast (compare Addir Hu, Aḳdamut, Hallel). It is sung almost universally by Jews on this festival (although there are many other traditional melodies). It has come to be regarded as the only Hanukkah melody, four other Hebrew hymns for the occasion being also sung to it). It was originally sung for "Shene Zetim" (שני זיתים or שני זתים, "Two Olives" (the ones that supply oil to the Menorah from Zechariah's vision, Zech. 4)), a piyyut, preceding the Shema of shaharith of the (first) Shabat of Hanukah. "Shene Zetim" alone is now sometimes sung to a melody which two centuries ago was associated with "Ma'oz tzur". The latter is a Jewish-sounding air in the minor mode, and is found in Benedetto Marcello's "Estro Poetico Armonico," or "Parafrasi Sopra li Salmi" (Venice, 1724), quoted as a melody of the German Jews, and utilized by Marcello as the theme for his "Psalm XV." This air has been transcribed by Cantor Birnbaum of Königsberg in the "Israelitische Wochenschrift" (1878, No. 51)

Traditional version:

Mombach’s version:

This most popular melody for the Hanukkah hymn has been identified by Birnbaum as an adaptation from the old German folk-song "So weiss ich eins, dass mich erfreut, das pluemlein auff preiter heyde," given in Böhme's "Altdeutsches Liederbuch" (No. 635); it was widely spread among German Jews as early as 1450. By an interesting coincidence, this folk-melody was also the first utilized by Luther for his German chorales. He set it to his "Nun freut euch, lieben Christen g'mein". It is the tune for a translation by F. E. Cox of the hymn "Sei Lob und Ehr dem höchsten Gut," by J. J. Schütz (1640–1730). As such it is called "Erk" (after the German hymnologist), and, with harmonies by Bach (BWV 388), appears as No. 283 of "Hymns, Ancient and Modern" (London, 1875). The earliest transcription of the Jewish form of the tune is by Isaac Nathan, who set it to the poem "On Jordan's Banks" in Byron's "Hebrew Melodies" (London, 1815). Later transcriptions have been numerous, and the air finds a place in every collection of Jewish melodies. It was modified to the form now favoured by British Jews by Julius Mombach, to whom is due the modulation to the dominant in the repetition of the first strain. In Mombach's version the closing phrase of each verse is not repeated. Prior to World War II in Germany this hymn was commonly sung with an alternative melody to the 2nd and 4th verses as recorded by Cantor Israel Alter. This alternative pre-war melody was revived by the Jewish Amsterdam Chamber Ensemble in the Royal Concertgebouw in 2018.

== Text ==
Hebrew	Romanization	Translation
מָעוֹז צוּר יְשׁוּעָתִי, לְךָ נָאֶה לְשַׁבֵּחַ תִּכּוֹן בֵּית תְּפִלָּתִי, וְשָׁם תּוֹדָה נְזַבֵּחַ. לְעֵת תָּכִין מַטְבֵּחַ מִצָּר הַמְנַבֵּחַ. אָז אֶגְמוֹר בְּשִׁיר מִזְמוֹר חֲנֻכַּת הַמִּזְבֵּחַ.	Ma'oz Tzur Yeshu'ati, lekha na'eh leshabe'ach. Tikon beit tefilati, v'esham toda nezabe'ach. Le'et takhin matbe'ach mitzar hamnabe'ach. Az egmor beshir mizmor chanukat hamizbe'ach.	My Refuge, my Rock of Salvation! 'Tis pleasant to sing Your praises. Let our house of prayer be restored. And there we will offer You our thanks. When You will have slaughtered the barking foe. Then we will celebrate with song and psalm the altar's dedication.
רָעוֹת שָׂבְעָה נַפְשִׁי, בְּיָגוֹן כֹּחִי כָּלָה חַיַּי מֵרְרוּ בְקֹשִׁי, בְּשִׁעְבּוּד מַלְכוּת עֶגְלָה וּבְיָדוֹ הַגְּדוֹלָה הוֹצִיא אֶת הַסְּגֻלָּה חֵיל פַּרְעֹה וְכָל זַרְעוֹ יָרְדוּ כְּאֶבֶן בִּמְצוּלָה.	Ra'ot save'ah nafshi, b'yagon kochi kala. Chayai mereru be'koshi, b'shi'abud malkhut egla. Uvyado hagdola hotzi et hasgula. Cheil par'o v'khol zar'o yaredu ke'even bimtzula.	My soul was sated with misery, my strength was spent with grief. They embittered my life with hardship, When enslaved under the rule of Egypt. But God with His mighty power Brought out His treasured people; While Pharaoh's host and followers Sank like a stone into the deep.
דְּבִיר קָדְשׁוֹ הֱבִיאַנִי, וְגַם שָׁם לֹא שָׁקַטְתִּי וּבָא נוֹגֵשׂ וְהִגְלַנִי, כִּי זָרִים עָבַדְתִּי וְיֵין רַעַל מָסַכְתִּי, כִּמְעַט שֶׁעָבַרְתִּי קֵץ בָּבֶל זְרֻבָּבֶל, לְקֵץ שִׁבְעִים נוֹשַׁעְתִּי.	D'vir kodsho hevi'ani, ve'gam sham lo shakateti. Uva noges ve'higlani, ki zarim avadti. Ve'yein ra'al masakhti, kim'at she'avarti. Ketz Bavel Z'rubavel, le'ketz shiv'im nosha'ati.	He brought me to His holy abode. Even there, I found no rest. The oppressor came and exiled me, Because I served strange gods, and drank poisonous wine. (Note: Follower of heretical teaching i.e. heretical doctrines) Yet scarcely had I gone into exile, When Babylon fell and Zerubbabel took charge; Within seventy years I was saved.
כְּרוֹת קוֹמַת בְּרוֹשׁ בִּקֵּשׁ, אֲגָגִי בֶּן הַמְּדָתָא וְנִהְיָתָה לוֹ לְפַח וּלְמוֹקֵשׁ, וְגַאֲוָתוֹ נִשְׁבָּתָה רֹאשׁ יְמִינִי נִשֵּׂאתָ, וְאוֹיֵב שְׁמוֹ מָחִיתָ רֹב בָּנָיו וְקִנְיָנָיו עַל הָעֵץ תָּלִיתָ.	K'rot komat berosh bikesh, Agagi ben Hamdatah. ve'niheyata lo le'fach ulemokesh, ve'ga'avato nishbata. Rosh ye'mini niseta, ve'oyev shmo machita. Rov banav ve'kinyanav al ha'etz talita.	The Agagite, (Note: Haman) son of Hammedatha, plotted to cut down the lofty fir; (Note: Mordecai); But it proved a snare to him, and his insolence was silenced. You raised the head of the Benjamite, but the enemy's name You blotted out. His numerous sons and his household You hanged upon the gallows.
יְוָנִים נִקְבְּצוּ עָלַי, אֲזַי בִּימֵי חַשְׁמַנִּים וּפָרְצוּ חוֹמוֹת מִגְדָּלַי, וְטִמְּאוּ כָּל הַשְּׁמָנִים וּמִנּוֹתַר קַנְקַנִּים נַעֲשָׂה נֵס לַשּׁוֹשַׁנִּים בְּנֵי בִינָה יְמֵי שְׁמוֹנָה קָבְעוּ שִׁיר וּרְנָנִים	Ye'vanim nikbetzu alai, azai bimei Chashmanim. Ufartzu chomot migdalai, ve'tim'u kol hashmanim. Uminotar kankanim na'asa nes lashoshanim. B'nei vina y'mei shmona kav'u shir ur'nanim.	The Greeks gathered against me, in days of the Hasmoneans. They broke down the walls of my towers, and defiled all the oils. But from the last remaining flask a miracle was wrought for the Jews. (Note: Literally 'the lilies' [later interpreted by some as 'roses'], an affectionate name for Israel); Therefore the sages of the day ordained these eight for songs of praise.
חֲשׂוֹף זרוֹעַ קדְשֶׁךָ וְקָרֵב קֵץ הַיְשׁוּעָה נְקֹם נִקְמַת (דָם) עֲבָדֶיךָ מֵאֻמָּה הָרְשָׁעָה כִּי אָרְכָה הַשָּׁעָה וְאֵין קֵץ לִימֵי הָרָעָה דְּחֵה אַדְמוֹן בְּצֵל צַלְמוֹן הָקֵם לָנוּ רוֹעִים שִׁבְעָה	Chasof z'ro'a kodshekha, ve'karev ketz hayeshu'a. N'kom nikmat (dam) avadeikha me'uma haresha'a. Ki arkha hasha'a, ve'ein ketz limei hara'a. D'cheh admon betzel tzalmon, hakem lanu ro'im shiv'a.	O bare Your holy arm and bring the end [of] salvation. (Note: Yeshua literally means 'salvation' but its use here is ambiguously worded so that it may also be read as 'Jesus', and thus the longer phrase may be read either as 'final salvation' or as 'an end to Jesus[ism]'.); Wreak vengeance upon the (blood of the) wicked nation, On behalf of your faithful servants. For deliverance has too long been delayed; And the evil days are endless. O Reject the enemy (Note: Literally "the Red One" referring to Esau (Edom) (Genesis 25:25).) into the shadows of death, and set up for us the seven shepherds. (Note: Who will deliver Israel from oppression (Micah 5:4))

=== English version ===
A popular non-literal translation, called "Rock of Ages", is based on the German version by Leopold Stein (1810–1882), and was written by Talmudic linguist Marcus Jastrow and Gustav Gottheil.

These are the original English lyrics, which are sometimes changed into gender neutral language.

Rock of Ages, let our song, praise Thy saving power;
Thou, amidst the raging foes, wast our sheltering tower.
Furious they assailed us, but Thine arm availed us,
And Thy Word broke their sword, when our own strength failed us.

Kindling new the holy lamps, priests, approved in suffering,
Purified the nation's shrine, brought to God their offering.
And His courts surrounding, hear, in joy abounding,
Happy throngs, singing songs with a mighty sounding.

Children of the martyr race, whether free or fettered,
Wake the echoes of the songs where ye may be scattered.
Yours the message cheering that the time is nearing
Which will see, all men free, tyrants disappearing.

== In popular culture ==
The piyyut inspired Israeli songwriter Naomi Shemer to write the song "Shivchei Ma'oz" (meaning "praises of the fortress"), as performed by the IDF's Southern Command Band in 1969. In this song Shemer drew a connection between the Jewish hymn and the military positions (Bar Lev Line) that were attacked in the War of Attrition at the time.

Folk-rock band Blackmore's Night included a version of this song (as "Ma-O-Tzur") on their 2006 album Winter Carols, which includes the first verse in Hebrew followed by an adapted English translation.
