= Adam Gardner =

American musician

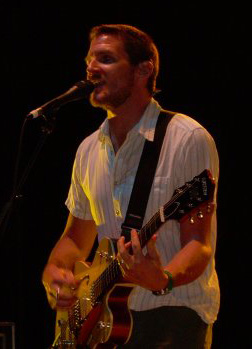
- Gardner in 2007

Background information
- Also known as: Adam LeeVee
- Born: Adam Seth Gardner; May 31, 1973 (age 52); New Jersey, U.S.
- Origin: Morristown, New Jersey, U.S.
- Genres: Alternative rock
- Occupation: Musician
- Instruments: Vocals, guitar, bass, keyboard, banjo, trumpet
- Member of: Guster

Adam Seth Gardner (born May 31, 1973) is an American guitarist and vocalist of the rock band Guster and a member of the Tufts University Beelzebubs.

== Biography ==
Gardner grew up outside Morristown, New Jersey, and played for a band called Royal Flush while a student at the Pingry School, from which he graduated in 1991. He also attended Harding Township School in New Vernon, New Jersey. Gardner, working with Dave Schneider, created a side-project in 2005 called The LeeVees. Its album, Hanukkah Rocks, consists of humorous original songs about the Jewish holiday. After living in Brooklyn near the other members of Guster for a time, Gardner relocated to Maine.

Gardner broadcasts a weekly radio show in Portland, Maine where he discusses everything from music to environmental issues.

=== Environmental activism ===
Adam and his wife Lauren started Reverb, an eco-friendly companion to summer rock tours. Gardner was interviewed about Reverb for the July 2006 issue of The Green Room.

== Awards and recognition ==
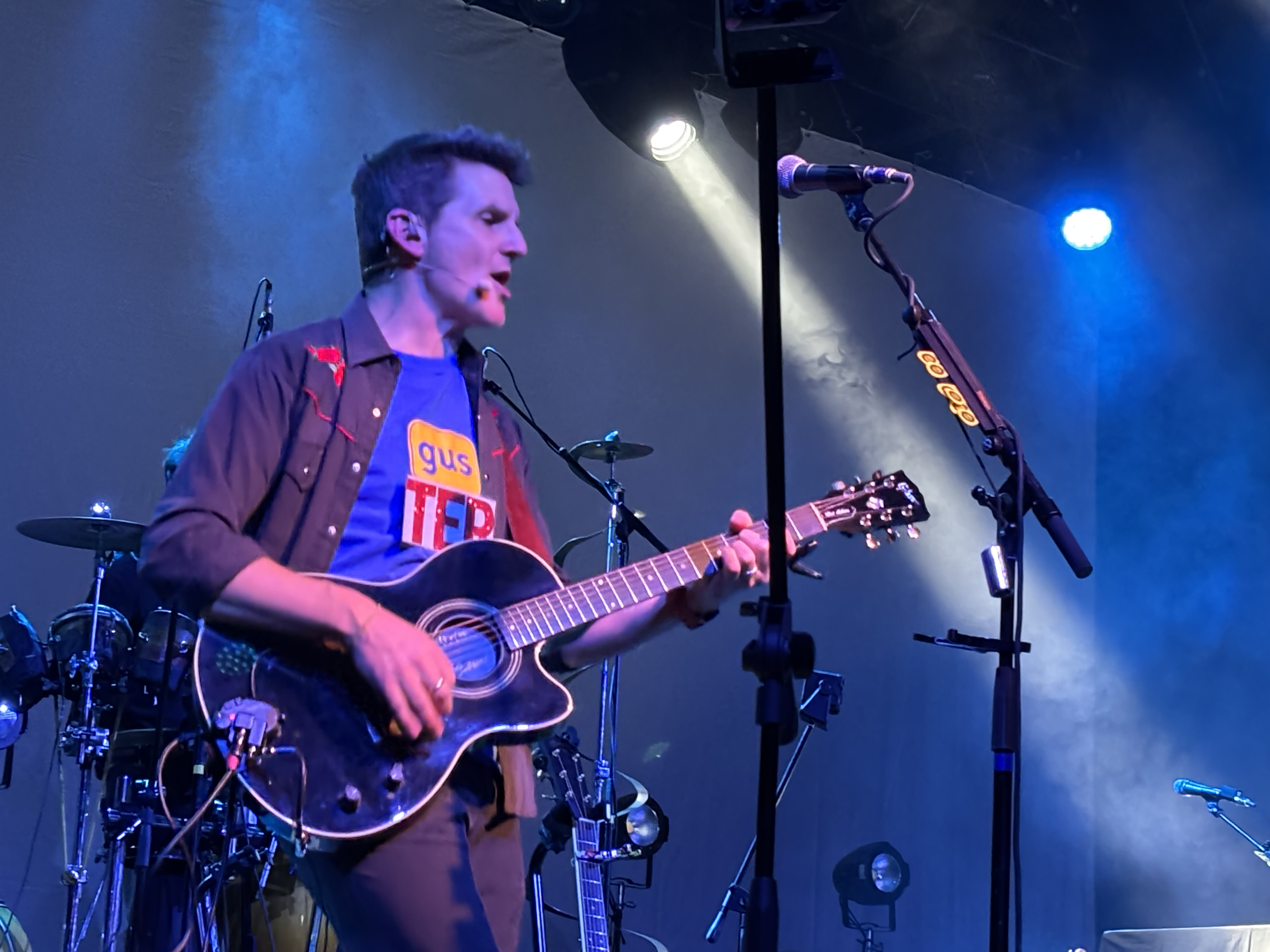
Adam Gardner performs on Guster's "We Also Have Eras" tour at The Fillmore in Philadelphia on January 24, 2025.

Gardner was recognized as Time100 Climate person of the year in 2023.
