= Ocho Kandelikas =

Ladino Hanukkah song

"Ocho Kandelikas"
Performed by the Singing Sergeants of the United States Air Force Band

"Ocho Kandelikas" ("Eight Little Candles") is a Judaeo-Spanish (Ladino) song celebrating the holiday of Hanukkah, written by the Jewish-American composer Flory Jagoda in 1983.

The song is sung in Ladino, an Old Spanish-derived language traditionally associated with the Sephardic Jewish community. The song is often performed in an Argentine tango-rhythm with accompanying accordion and violins. The lyrics of the song describe a child's joy of lighting the candles on the menorah every night of Hanukkah.

== Lyrics ==
Ladino (transliterated)
𝄆 Hanukka linda sta aki,
ocho kandelas para mi. 𝄇
Refrain:
O – Una kandelika,
dos kandelikas,
trez kandelikas,
kuatro kandelikas,
sintyu kandelikas,
sej kandelikas,
siete kandelikas,
ocho kandelas para mi

𝄆 Muchas fiestas vo fazer,
kon alegriyas y plazer. 𝄇
Refrain

𝄆 Los pastelikos vo kumer,
kon almendrikas y la myel. 𝄇
Refrain

Spanish
𝄆 Janucá linda está aquí,
ocho candelas para mi. 𝄇

O – Una candelita,
dos candelitas,
tres candelitas,
cuatro candelitas,
cinco candelitas,
seis candelitas,
siete candelitas,
ocho candelas para mi.

𝄆 Muchas fiestas van hacer,
con alegrías y placer. 𝄇

𝄆 Los pastelitos voy a comer,
con almendritas y miel. 𝄇

English
𝄆 Beautiful Hanukkah is here,
eight candles for me. 𝄇

O – One little candle,
two little candles,
three little candles,
four little candles,
five little candles,
six little candles,
seven little candles,
eight candles for me.

𝄆 Many parties to have,
with happiness and pleasure. 𝄇

𝄆 Little pastries to eat,
with little almonds and honey. 𝄇

== Performances ==
The song has been recorded and performed by:

- Sarah Aroeste, an American singer and composer, on her album: Hanuká
- Erran Baron Cohen
- Hip Hop Hoodíos, a multilingual rock group
- Flory Jagoda, a Bosnian-born American musician and singer-songwriter
- Yasmin Levy, an Israeli singer-songwriter of Ladino music
- Pink Martini, a Portland-based lounge orchestra
- Idina Menzel, an American actress, performer, singer and songwriter
- Vocolot, a female a cappella ensemble
- Voice of the Turtle, on their album Circle of Fire, Boston 1986
- Diego's Umbrella, American Gypsy rock band, 2018
