= Lilith Fair =

Canadian-American female-centric concert tour

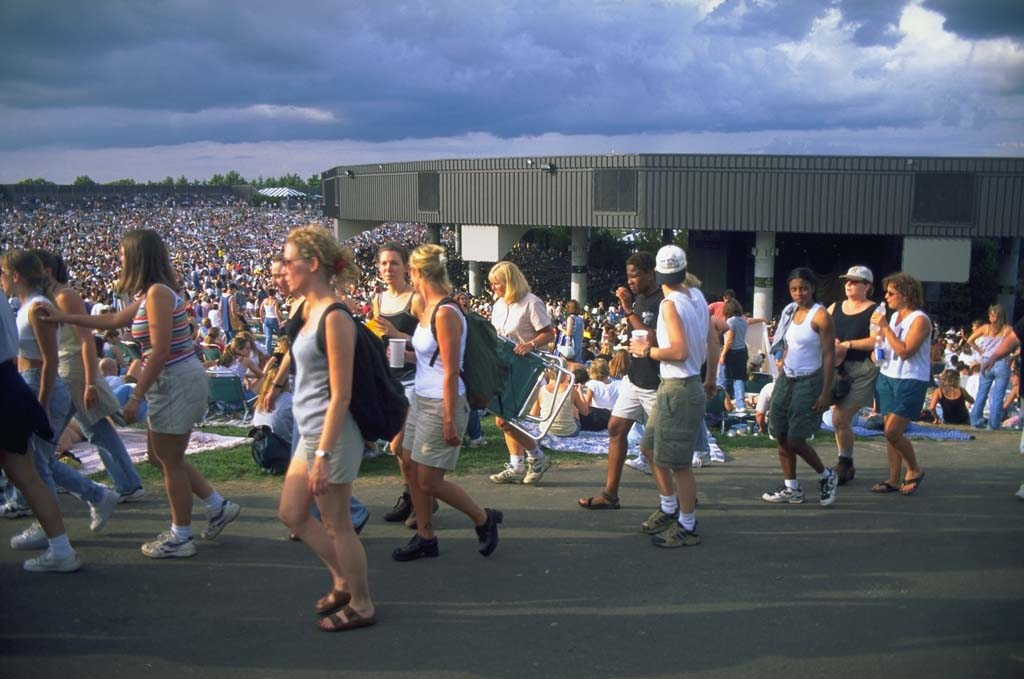
The main stage, September 22, 1998, Great Woods Center, Mansfield, Massachusetts

Lilith Fair was a concert tour and travelling music festival, founded by Canadian musician Sarah McLachlan, Nettwerk Music Group's Dan Fraser and Terry McBride, and New York talent agent Marty Diamond. It took place during the summers of 1997 to 1999, and was revived in the summer of 2010. It consisted solely of female solo artists and female-led bands. In its initial three years, Lilith Fair raised over $10 million for charity.

== History ==
In 1996, Canadian musical artist Sarah McLachlan became frustrated with concert promoters and radio stations that refused to feature two female musicians in a row. Bucking conventional industry "wisdom", she booked a successful tour for herself and Paula Cole. At least one of their appearances together—in Vancouver, British Columbia, on September 14, 1996—went by the name "Lilith Fair" and included performances by McLachlan, Cole, Lisa Loeb, and Michelle McAdorey, formerly of Crash Vegas.

The next year, McLachlan founded the Lilith Fair tour, taking the name "Lilith" from the medieval Jewish legend that Lilith was Adam's first wife who refused to be subservient to him.

In 1997, Lilith Fair garnered a $16 million gross, making it the top-grossing of any touring festival. Among all concert tours for that year, it was the 16th-highest grossing. McLachlan followed this success with two more rounds, in 1998 and 1999.

In 2010, Lilith Fair staged a revival with mixed results, as several dates were cancelled and many performers backed out of scheduled performances.

In March 2011, McLachlan declared that the Lilith concept was no longer being considered for future shows, due to changing audience views and expectations.

Three volumes of Lilith Fair: A Celebration of Women in Music documented the performances and a retrospective documentary, Lilith Fair: Building A Mystery - The Untold Story, premiered in 2025.

== Performers ==
=== 1997 ===
The artists appearing at Lilith Fair varied by date (with McLachlan and Suzanne Vega the only artists to play all dates). Appearances were organized into three stages. Almost all Village Stage artists performed only one or two dates. Many of them won slots on the bill in a series of local talent searches in their home cities.

Main stage artists

- Fiona Apple
- Tracy Bonham
- Meredith Brooks
- The Cardigans
- Mary Chapin Carpenter
- Tracy Chapman
- Paula Cole
- Shawn Colvin
- Sheryl Crow
- Indigo Girls
- Emmylou Harris
- Jewel
- Lisa Loeb
- Sarah McLachlan
- Joan Osborne
- Suzanne Vega

Second stage artists

- Leah Andreone
- Autour de Lucie
- Mary Black
- Holly Cole
- Patty Griffin
- Juliana Hatfield
- Susanna Hoffs
- Katell Keineg
- Dana Anton
- Mary Jane Lamond
- Yungchen Lhamo
- Lhasa de Sela
- Tara MacLean
- Dayna Manning
- Abra Moore
- Mudgirl
- Once Blue
- Madeleine Peyroux
- September '67
- Wild Colonials
- Wild Strawberries
- Dar Williams
- Victoria Williams
- Kelly Willis
- Cassandra Wilson

Village Stage artists

- Fleming and John
- Dido
- Pat Benatar
- Kinnie Starr
- Lauren Hoffman
- Kim Fox
- Garrison Starr
- Lori Carson
- Joy Askew
- Jill Sobule
- Alana Davis
- Beth Orton
- Michelle Malone
- Holly McNarland
- Elise Knoll
- Coco Love Alcorn
- Lovechild
- Dayna Manning
- Catherine Kidd
- Oh Suzanna
- Camille
- Alisha's Attic
- Gena and Sum Girl
- Marley & Lizann
- Sensual World
- Jenny Labow
- Suz Andreasen
- Davina
- Morcheeba
- K's Choice

Dates and venues

Date	City	Country	Venue
July 5	George	United States	The Gorge
July 6	Salem	United States	L. B. Day Amphitheatre
July 8	Mountain View	United States	Shoreline Amphitheatre
July 9	Irvine	United States	Irvine Meadows Amphitheatre
July 10	Phoenix	United States	Desert Sky Pavilion
July 12	Winter Park	United States	Winter Park Music Festival
July 14	Bonner Springs	United States	Sandstone Amphitheatre
July 15	Maryland Heights	United States	Riverport Amphitheatre
July 17	Cuyahoga Falls	United States	Blossom Music Center
July 18	Clarkston	United States	Pine Knob Music Theatre
July 19	Clarkston	United States	Pine Knob Music Theatre
July 20	Canandaigua	United States	Constellation Brands-Marvin Sands Performing Arts Center
July 22	Mansfield	United States	Great Woods Center
July 24	Hartford	United States	Meadows Music Theatre
July 25	Wantagh	United States	Jones Beach
July 26	Holmdel	United States	PNC Bank Arts Center
July 27	Camden	United States	Blockbuster-Sony E-Centre
July 29	Columbia	United States	Merriweather Post Pavilion
July 30	Raleigh	United States	Walnut Creek Pavilion

Date	City	Country	Venue
July 31	Charlotte	United States	Blockbuster Pavilion
August 1	Atlanta	United States	Coca-Cola Lakewood
August 3	The Woodlands	United States	Cynthia Woods Mitchell Pavilion
August 4	Dallas	United States	Starplex
August 6	Antioch	United States	Starwood Amphitheatre
August 7	Cincinnati	United States	Riverbend Music Center
August 8	Noblesville	United States	Deer Creek Music Center
August 9	Tinley Park	United States	New World Music Theater
August 10	Columbus	United States	Polaris Amphitheater
August 12	Burgettstown	United States	Star Lake
August 13	Scranton	United States	Montage Mountain
August 14	Ottawa	Canada	Frank Clair Stadium
August 15	Toronto	Canada	Molson Amphitheatre
August 16	Toronto	Canada	Molson Amphitheatre
August 17	Montreal	Canada	Stade Du Maurier
August 19	Milwaukee	United States	Marcus Amphitheater
August 20	Shakopee	United States	Canterbury Park
August 22	Calgary	Canada	McMahon Stadium
August 24	Vancouver	Canada	Thunderbird Stadium
December 16	West Palm Beach	United States	Coral Sky Amphitheater

=== 1998 ===
The artists appearing at Lilith Fair varied by date (with McLachlan the only artist to play all dates). Appearances were organized into three stages. Though Neneh Cherry and Lauryn Hill were scheduled to play some shows, both had to cancel. Almost all Village Stage artists performed only one or two dates. Many of them won slots on the bill in a series of local talent searches in their home cities.

Main stage artists

- Sarah McLachlan
- Bonnie Raitt
- Chantal Kreviazuk
- Cowboy Junkies
- Des'ree
- Diana Krall
- Emmylou Harris
- Erykah Badu
- Indigo Girls
- Joan Osborne
- Lisa Loeb
- Liz Phair
- Luscious Jackson
- Mary Chapin Carpenter
- Meredith Brooks
- Meshell Ndegeocello
- Missy Elliott
- Natalie Merchant
- Paula Cole
- Queen Latifah
- Shawn Colvin
- Sheryl Crow
- Sinéad O'Connor
- Suzanne Vega
- Tracy Bonham

Second stage artists

- K's Choice
- Mono
- Sister 7
- Heather Nova
- Morcheeba
- Rebekah
- Lucinda Williams
- Victoria Williams
- Abra Moore
- Neneh Cherry
- Elise Knoll
- Mary Lou Lord
- The Tuesdays
- Billie Myers
- N'Dea Davenport
- Martina McBride
- Litany
- Paris Hampton
- Davina
- Beth Orton
- Holly Cole
- Diana King
- Chantal Kreviazuk
- Eden aka
- Wild Strawberries
- Patty Griffin
- Lhasa de Sela
- Angélique Kidjo
- Imani Coppola
- Lucy Gamelon
- Kacy Crowley
- Holly McNarland
- Ebba Forsberg
- Catie Curtis
- Letters to Cleo
- Neko Case
- Fisher

Village Stage artists

- Tara MacLean
- Sinéad Lohan
- Autour de Lucie
- Ana Gasteyer
- Garrison Starr
- Emm Gryner
- Anggun
- Kacy Crowley
- Bic Runga
- Melanie Doane
- Abra Moore
- Mae Moore
- Joaelle Ndine Romero
- Tia Texada
- Jenny Bird
- Sherri Jackson
- 1/2 Mad Poet
- Mono
- Thornetta Davis
- Julie Kryk
- Lori Amey
- Fontaine
- Donna Martin
- Abba Rage
- Deni Bonet
- Jabber
- Victoria Hogg
- Eden White
- Antigone Rising
- Paris Hampton
- Nancy Falkow
- Dead Girls and Other
- Love Riot
- Trish Murphy
- The Nields
- Glassoline
- Roadie Ray
- INHOUSE
- Audra Jost
- Clandestine
- Gordian Knot
- Cling
- Frankly Scarlet
- Sixpence None the Richer
- Robyn Ragland
- Rose Polenzani
- Alexis Antes
- Amy Rigby
- Erin Echo
- Syd Straw
- Laurie Geltman
- Melissa Ferrick
- Lenni Jabour
- Ali Eisner
- Swamperella
- Alison Pipitone
- Nina Storey
- Julianne Blue
- Idina Menzel
- Noëlle Hampton
- Arone Dyer
- India Arie

Dates

Date	City	Country	Venue
June 19	Portland	United States	Civic Stadium
June 20	George	United States	The Gorge Amphitheatre
June 21	George	United States	The Gorge Amphitheatre
June 23	Mountain View	United States	Shoreline Amphitheatre
June 24	Mountain View	United States	Shoreline Amphitheatre
June 26	Del Mar	United States	Del Mar Fairgrounds
June 27	Pasadena	United States	Rose Bowl
June 28	Phoenix	United States	Desert Sky Pavilion
June 29	Bernalillo	United States	New Mexico Wine Festival
July 1	Oklahoma City	United States	All Sports Stadium
July 2	Bonner Springs	United States	Sandstone Amphitheatre
July 4	Noblesville	United States	Deer Creek
July 5	Columbus	United States	Polaris Amphitheater
July 6	Clarkston	United States	Pine Knob Music Theatre
July 7	Clarkston	United States	Pine Knob Music Theatre
July 8	Clarkston	United States	Pine Knob Music Theatre
July 10	Canandaigua	United States	Constellation Brands-Marvin Sands Performing Arts Center
July 11	Hartford	United States	Meadows Music Theatre
July 12	Saratoga Springs	United States	Saratoga Performing Arts Center
July 13	Holmdel	United States	PNC Bank Arts Center
July 15	Wantagh	United States	Jones Beach Theatre
July 16	Wantagh	United States	Jones Beach Theatre
July 17	Camden	United States	Blockbuster-Sony E-Centre
July 18	Columbia	United States	Merriweather Post Pavilion
July 19	Columbia	United States	Merriweather Post Pavilion
July 21	Virginia Beach	United States	GTE Virginia Beach Amphitheatre
July 22	Raleigh	United States	Hardee's Walnut Creek Amphitheatre
July 23	Charlotte	United States	Blockbuster Pavilion
July 24	Atlanta	United States	Coca-Cola Lakewood Amphitheatre

Date	City	Country	Venue
July 26	West Palm Beach	United States	Coral Sky Amphitheatre
July 27	Orlando	United States	Central Florida Fairgrounds
July 29	The Woodlands	United States	Woodlands Pavilion
July 30	The Woodlands	United States	Woodlands Pavilion
July 31	Austin	United States	South Park Meadows
August 1	Dallas	United States	Coca-Cola Starplex Amphitheatre
August 3	Antioch	United States	Starwood Amphitheatre
August 4	Maryland Heights	United States	Riverport Amphitheatre
August 5	Tinley Park	United States	New World Music Theatre
August 6	Cuyahoga Falls	United States	Blossom Music Center
August 8	Cincinnati	United States	Riverbend Music Center
August 9	Burgettstown	United States	Star Lake Amphitheatre
August 10	Hershey	United States	Hersheypark Stadium
August 11	Mansfield	United States	Great Woods
August 12	Mansfield	United States	Great Woods
August 14	Ottawa	Canada	Lansdowne Park
August 15	Toronto	Canada	Molson Amphitheatre
August 16	Toronto	Canada	Molson Amphitheatre
August 17	Darien	United States	Darien Lake Theme Park Resort
August 19	Milwaukee	United States	Marcus Amphitheater
August 20	Milwaukee	United States	Marcus Amphitheater
August 21	Shakopee	United States	Canterbury Park
August 23	Greenwood Village	United States	Fiddler's Green Amphitheatre
August 25	Park City	United States	The Canyons/Wolf Mountain Ski Resort
August 26	Nampa	United States	Idaho Center Amphitheatre
August 28	Calgary	Canada	McMahon Stadium
August 29	Edmonton	Canada	Commonwealth Stadium
August 31	Vancouver	Canada	Thunderbird Stadium

=== 1999 ===
The artists appearing at Lilith Fair varied by date (with McLachlan the only artist to play all dates). Appearances were organized into three stages.

Main stage artists

- Sandra Bernhard
- Shawn Colvin
- Deborah Cox
- Sheryl Crow
- Dixie Chicks
- Indigo Girls
- Queen Latifah
- Lisa Loeb
- Luscious Jackson
- Martina McBride
- Sarah McLachlan
- Monica
- Mýa
- Meshell Ndegeocello
- Liz Phair
- The Pretenders
- Joanelle Romero
- Disappear Fear
- Suzanne Vega

Second stage artists

- Battershell
- Cibo Matto
- Kacy Crowley
- Dance Hall Crashers
- Dido
- Melanie Doane
- Patty Griffin
- Emm Gryner
- The Innocence Mission
- Joan Jones
- Elise Knoll Band
- Jennifer Knapp
- K's Choice
- Sinéad Lohan
- Tara MacLean
- Aimee Mann
- Melky Sedeck
- Mediæval Bæbes
- Morley
- Trish Murphy
- Bif Naked
- Beth Orton
- Kendall Payne
- Bijou Phillips
- Samsara
- Sixpence None the Richer
- Splashdown
- Susan Tedeschi
- Wild Strawberries
- Victoria Williams
- Kelly Willis

Village Stage artists

- Christina Aguilera
- Coco Love Alcorn
- Badi Assad
- Bertine Zetlitz
- Toni Blackman
- Diana Braithwaite
- Cowlily
- Kacy Crowley
- E.G. Daily
- Keren DeBerg
- Anne E. DeChant
- Jennie DeVoe
- Eden AKA
- Ana Egge
- Essence
- Nancy Falkow
- Amy Fairchild
- Fleming and John
- Nelly Furtado
- Fuzzy Comets
- Glassoline
- Grace in Gravity
- Greta Gaines
- Kitty Gordon
- Nina Gordon
- Kay Hanley
- Kristin Hersh
- Noella Hutton
- Jarah Jane
- Brenda Kahn
- Jennifer Kimball
- Nikol Kollars
- Nicol Lischka
- Ginger Mackenzie
- The Marty Winkler Group
- Melissa Mathes
- Lori McKenna
- Tiffany Shea
- The Murmurs
- Leona Naess
- Juliana Nash
- Kari Newhouse
- Leslie Nuchow
- Maren Ord
- Ginny Owens
- Deborah Pardes
- Adrienne Pierce
- Melissa Reaves
- Renann
- Doria Roberts
- Loni Rose
- Rachael Sage
- Tegan and Sara
- Summer Sage
- Lisa Sanders
- Stephanie Schneiderman
- Bree Sharp
- She-Haw
- Shelley Doty X-Tet
- Alexandra Sleightholm
- Soul Miner's Daughter
- Sozzi
- Surrender Dorothy
- Kinnie Starr
- Melanie Susuras
- Kashi Tara
- Tekla
- Too Cynical to Cry
- Deborah Vial
- Victoria White
- Wendy Woo
- Zoebliss
- Xolie Morra & The Strange Kind

Dates and venues

Date	City	Country	Venue
July 8	Vancouver	Canada	Thunderbird Stadium
July 9	George	United States	The Gorge Amphitheatre
July 10	George	United States	The Gorge Amphitheatre
July 11	Portland	United States	Civic Stadium
July 13	Mountain View	United States	Shoreline Amphitheatre
July 14	Mountain View	United States	Shoreline Amphitheatre
July 16	Chula Vista	United States	Coors Amphitheatre
July 17	Pasadena	United States	Rose Bowl
July 18	Phoenix	United States	Desert Sky Pavilion
July 20	Austin	United States	South Park Meadows
July 21	Dallas	United States	Starplex Amphitheatre
July 23	Atlanta	United States	Lakewood Amphitheatre
July 24	Atlanta	United States	Lakewood Amphitheatre
July 25	Antioch	United States	First American Music Center
July 27	Charlotte	United States	Blockbuster Pavilion
July 28	Columbia	United States	Merriweather Post Pavilion
July 30	Camden	United States	Blockbuster-Sony E-Centre
July 31	Hershey	United States	Hersheypark Stadium
August 1	Canandaigua	United States	Constellation Brands-Marvin Sands Performing Arts Center
August 3	Mansfield	United States	Tweeter Center

Date	City	Country	Venue
August 4	Hartford	United States	Meadows Music Theatre
August 6	Wantagh	United States	Jones Beach Theater
August 7	Holmdel Township	United States	PNC Bank Arts Center
August 8	Holmdel Township	United States	PNC Bank Arts Center
August 10	Columbus	United States	Polaris Amphitheater
August 11	Cincinnati	United States	Riverbend Music Center
August 13	Burgettstown	United States	Star Lake Amphitheatre
August 14	Clarkston	United States	Pine Knob
August 15	Clarkston	United States	Pine Knob
August 17	Cuyahoga Falls	United States	Blossom Music Center
August 18	Noblesville	United States	Deer Creek Music Center
August 19	Tinley Park	United States	World Music Theater
August 21	Toronto	Canada	Molson Amphitheatre
August 22	Toronto	Canada	Molson Amphitheatre
August 24	Milwaukee	United States	Marcus Amphitheater
August 25	Shakopee	United States	Canterbury Park
August 26	Bonner Springs	United States	Sandstone Amphitheatre
August 28	Greenwood Village	United States	Fiddler's Green Amphitheatre
August 29	Greenwood Village	United States	Fiddler's Green Amphitheatre
August 31	Edmonton	Canada	Commonwealth Stadium

== 2010 revival ==
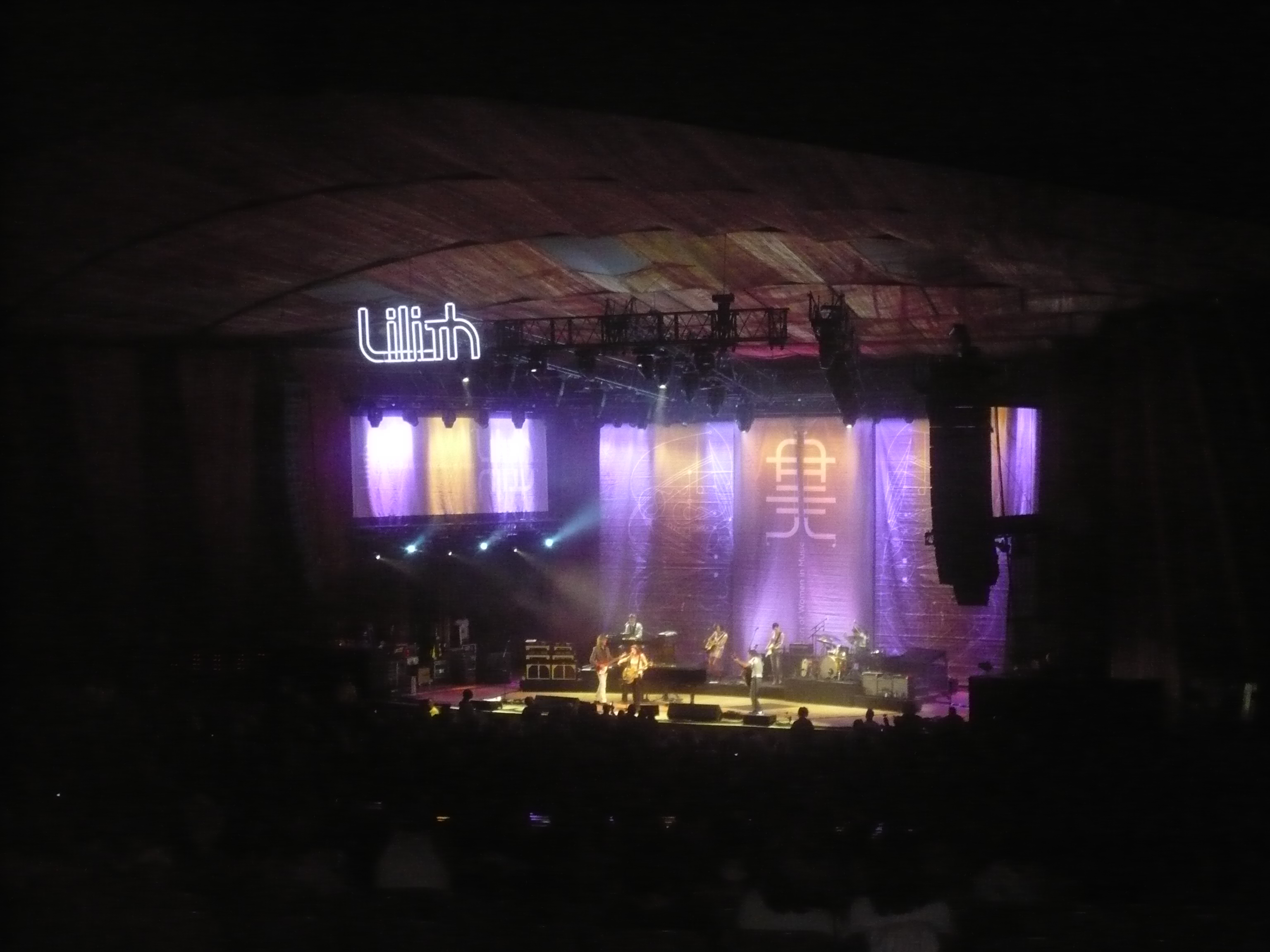
The 2010 stage at a date in Cuyahoga Falls

In an April 25, 2009, Twitter post, Nettwerk founder Terry McBride announced that a Lilith Fair tour through North America would be relaunched for the summer of 2010, with a two-week tour of Europe to follow.

The tour was plagued with financial problems from the beginning. The first seven shows were sparsely attended and the eighth show was the first to be cancelled. Initially, Sarah McLachlan claimed (in an interview posted on the Arizona Republic website on July 9) that the July 8 Phoenix show was cancelled in protest of Arizona Senate Bill 1070, which she strongly opposes.

The tour fell apart on the road as headliners Carly Simon, Norah Jones, Kelly Clarkson, the Go-Go's, and Queen Latifah dropped out, fearing that they would not be paid for their performances.

Due to poor ticket sales, thirteen shows (about one-third of the tour) were scratched (two announced on June 25, ten more on July 1, one additional on July 2) and one reassigned to a smaller venue.

The artists appearing at Lilith Fair vary by date (with McLachlan the only artist to play all dates). Appearances are organized into three stages. Below is a list of artists who performed at Lilith Fair in the 2010 revival.

Main stage artists

- Ann McNamee / Ann Atomic
- Anya Marina
- The Bangles
- Beth Orton
- Brandi Carlile
- Cat Power
- Chantal Kreviazuk
- Colbie Caillat
- Court Yard Hounds
- Emmylou Harris
- Erykah Badu
- A Fine Frenzy
- Gossip
- Heart
- Indigo Girls
- Ingrid Michaelson
- Janelle Monáe
- Jenni Rivera
- Lights
- Mary J. Blige
- Metric
- Miranda Lambert
- Missy Higgins
- Rosie Thomas
- Sara Bareilles
- Sarah McLachlan
- Serena Ryder
- Sheryl Crow
- Sugarland
- Suzanne Vega
- Tegan and Sara

Second stage artists

- Anjulie
- Ash Koley
- Donna De Lory
- Erin McCarley
- Jasmine Chadwick
- Jennifer Knapp
- Kate Miller-Heidke
- Kate Nash
- Kina Grannis
- Marina and the Diamonds
- Nikki Jean
- Nneka
- The Submarines
- Susan Justice
- Vedera
- Vita Chambers
- The Weepies

Village Stage artists

- Xolie Morra & The Strange Kind
- Sierra Noble
- Airplanes
- Amanda Lucas & Audrey Cecil
- Bella Ruse
- Butterfly Boucher
- Cara Salimando
- Corrin Campbell
- Darrelle London
- Elizaveta
- Jes Hudak
- Jesca Hoop
- Jetty Rae
- Joy Ike
- Jill Hennessy
- Julia Othmer
- Kate Tucker
- Katie Todd
- Kitten
- Lissie
- Lucy Schwartz
- Marié Digby
- Meagan Smith
- Melissa McClelland
- Molly Jenson
- Sara Swanson
- Steph Macpherson
- Tara MacLean
- Terra Naomi
- Winterbloom (Antje Duvekot, Anne Heaton, Meg Hutchinson, Rose Polenzani, Natalia Zukerman)
- Zee Avi

Dates

Date	City	Country	Venue
June 27	Calgary	Canada	McMahon Stadium
June 28	Edmonton	Canada	Rexall Place
July 1	West Vancouver	Canada	Ambleside Park
July 2	Ridgefield	United States	The Amphitheater at Clark County
July 3	George	United States	The Gorge Amphitheatre
July 5	Mountain View	United States	Shoreline Amphitheatre
July 7	Chula Vista	United States	Cricket Wireless Amphitheatre
July 9	Las Vegas	United States	Mandalay Bay Events Center
July 10	Irvine	United States	Verizon Wireless Amphitheatre
July 13	Greenwood Village	United States	Comfort Dental Amphitheatre
July 15	Bonner Springs	United States	Capitol Federal Park @ Sandstone
July 16	Maryland Heights	United States	Verizon Wireless Amphitheater
July 17	Tinley Park	United States	First Midwest Bank Amphitheatre
July 18	Minneapolis	United States	Target Center
July 20	Noblesville	United States	Verizon Wireless Music Center
July 21	Clarkston	United States	DTE Energy Music Theatre
July 24	Toronto	Canada	Molson Amphitheatre
July 27	Cuyahoga Falls	United States	Blossom Music Center
July 28	Camden	United States	Susquehanna Bank Center
July 30	Mansfield	United States	Comcast Center
July 31	Holmdel	United States	PNC Bank Arts Center
August 1	Hartford	United States	Comcast Theatre
August 3	Columbia	United States	Merriweather Post Pavilion

Cancelled dates and venues

Date	City	Country	Venue
July 8	Phoenix	United States	Cricket Wireless Pavilion
July 12	West Valley City	United States	USANA Amphitheatre
July 23	Montreal	Canada	Bell Centre
August 4	Raleigh	United States	Time Warner Cable Music Pavilion at Walnut Creek
August 6	Charlotte	United States	Verizon Wireless Amphitheatre Charlotte
August 7	Nashville	United States	Bridgestone Arena
August 8	Atlanta	United States	Aaron's Amphitheatre at Lakewood
August 10	West Palm Beach	United States	Cruzan Amphitheatre
August 11	Tampa	United States	1-800-ASK-GARY Amphitheatre
August 12	Pelham	United States	Verizon Wireless Music Center Birmingham
August 14	Austin	United States	Never determined
August 15	The Woodlands	United States	Cynthia Woods Mitchell Pavilion
August 16	Dallas	United States	Superpages.com Center

== See also ==
- Lilith Fair: Building a Mystery, a 2025 documentary film about the festival
- Moondance International Film Festival
- Daisy Chain Fields
