= Teaching Mrs. Tingle =

1999 film by Kevin Williamson

- Theatrical release poster
- Directed by: Kevin Williamson
- Written by: Kevin Williamson
- Produced by: Cathy Konrad
- Starring: Helen Mirren; Katie Holmes; Barry Watson; Marisa Coughlan; Jeffrey Tambor; Liz Stauber; Molly Ringwald; Vivica A. Fox
- Cinematography: Jerzy Zieliński
- Edited by: Debra Neil-Fisher
- Music by: John Frizzell
- Production companies: Dimension Films; Konrad Pictures; Interscope Communications
- Distributed by: Miramax Films
- Release date: August 20, 1999
- Running time: 96 minutes
- Country: United States
- Language: English
- Budget: $14 million
- Box office: $8.9 million

Teaching Mrs. Tingle is a 1999 American teen black comedy thriller film written and directed by Kevin Williamson in his directorial debut, and starring Helen Mirren, Katie Holmes, Barry Watson, Marisa Coughlan, and Jeffrey Tambor. It follows a trio of high school seniors who must prove their innocence to their vindictive history teacher, who accuses them of cheating on their final exams. Williamson wrote the script before his work on Scream and Dawson's Creek. Following the success of those projects, his script was picked up and production of the film proceeded.

Released in the United States by Miramax Films on August 20, 1999, the film was originally titled Killing Mrs. Tingle and had a darker tone. It was delayed, re-edited and retitled due to the uproar over teen violence in films after the Columbine High School massacre. The film received mostly negative reviews from critics and was a box-office bomb.

== Plot ==
In Grandsboro, California, Leigh Ann Watson is a high school student living with her single mother, Faye, who works as a waitress. Leigh Ann's goals are to get top grades, become valedictorian, and leave town. However, her grade in history class is threatened by her teacher, Mrs. Eve Tingle, who has a special dislike for Leigh Ann and downgrades her well-designed project due to a minor historical inaccuracy. Fellow student Luke Churner makes a copy of Tingle's final exam and offers it to Leigh Ann, but she declines. However, Luke stashes the copy in Leigh Ann's backpack. Tingle discovers the copy and threatens to expel her. Tingle immediately heads to Principal Potter's office, but he has left for the day so she decides to tell him in the morning.

Leigh Ann, her best friend Jo Lynn Jordan, and Luke visit Tingle's house that night and try to persuade her that Leigh Ann is innocent. Tingle, however, refuses to listen. Luke threatens Tingle with a loaded crossbow, fellow student Brian Berry's project. A physical struggle ensues, and in the ensuing mêlée, Tingle is accidentally knocked unconscious. The trio panic and tie Tingle to her bed. Leigh Ann returns to her house and promises to return in the morning, while Luke and Jo Lynn are left to watch Tingle. While under Jo Lynn's watch, Tingle regains consciousness, and playing on her guilt, asks to be untied. Tingle immediately attacks Jo Lynn, but is restrained again by Luke.

The next morning, Jo Lynn calls the school and impersonates Tingle, calling in sick. Leigh Ann and Luke go to school, leaving Jo Lynn to watch Tingle. When they return, the trio devise a plan to blackmail Tingle by using fake photos of Luke and Tingle in bed together. Meanwhile, Tingle plays mind games with Jo Lynn, concerning her jealousy about Leigh Ann's supposed relationship with Luke. Later that day, the plan goes awry when Coach Richard Wenchell, the school's married gym teacher and Tingle's secret lover, visits the house. Jo Lynn, again, impersonates Tingle and blindfolds Coach Wenchell to hide her identity. When Wenchell passes out after a high intake of alcohol, the trio decide to blackmail Tingle by producing photographic evidence of her affair with Wenchell.

While Leigh Ann and Luke leave to have the pictures printed and take an unconscious Wenchell back home, Tingle reveals to Jo Lynn that Leigh Ann and Luke spent the night together at a party. Distraught, Jo Lynn leaves. When Leigh Ann and Luke arrive back, Leigh Ann berates Tingle for hating her because she has, unlike Tingle herself, the potential to leave town and experience life. Tingle retaliates that she used to be like Leigh Ann and that Tingle herself is Leigh Ann's future. In response, Leigh Ann and Luke have sex downstairs. Later, the two find Tingle's grade book. Leigh Ann marks down her rival Trudie Tucker's top A grade down to a B, and upgrades her own C to an A+. Tingle tells Jo Lynn that Leigh Ann and Luke had sex, and Jo Lynn confronts Leigh Ann. Leigh Ann confesses and Jo Lynn walks off in anger.

The next day at school, Jo Lynn ignores Leigh Ann, still hurt over the revelation. Leigh Ann tries to make amends, but admits that she had sex with Luke, further infuriating Jo Lynn. Tingle escapes from her bonds, ties Luke down in her place, and using the loaded crossbow, threatens Leigh Ann. Jo Lynn returns in a failed attempt to persuade Tingle she will help her blackmail Leigh Ann. After a violent fight, Tingle fires the crossbow, hitting Trudie in the chest as she enters the house. Leigh Ann checks her pulse and says she is dead. Potter arrives to check up on Tingle and is horrified by the scene. Guilt-ridden, Tingle confesses that she shot Trudie and wanted to make Leigh Ann fail like Tingle did herself. However, Trudie was protected by the thick textbook she was holding to her chest and is completely unharmed, which Leigh Ann already knew. Potter calls the police and fires Tingle. The film ends with Leigh Ann being named valedictorian at graduation.

== Cast ==
- Helen Mirren as Mrs. Eve Tingle
- Katie Holmes as Leigh Ann Watson
- Barry Watson as Luke Churner
- Marisa Coughlan as Jo Lynn Jordan
- Jeffrey Tambor as Coach Richard "Spanky" Wenchell
- Liz Stauber as Trudie Tucker
- Michael McKean as Principal Potter
- Lesley Ann Warren as Mrs. Faye Watson (uncredited)
- Molly Ringwald as Miss Banks
- Vivica A. Fox as Miss Gold
- John Patrick White as Brian Berry
- Cherie Johnson as Student (uncredited)
- Marissa Jaret Winokur as Student (uncredited)
- Robert Gant as Professor (scenes deleted)

== Production ==
=== Casting ===
Meryl Streep, Glenn Close, Sigourney Weaver and Sally Field were considered for the role of Mrs. Eve Tingle, the antagonist. Gillian Anderson was offered the role of Mrs. Tingle, but turned it down. Alicia Silverstone was considered for the role of Leigh Ann Watson, the protagonist.

Katie Holmes, who then had a principal role on Kevin Williamson's TV series Dawson's Creek, was cast as Leigh Ann in February 1998. Shortly after, Helen Mirren was cast in the role of Mrs. Tingle. Of Mirren, Williamson said, "I think Helen Mirren is one of the greatest living actresses that we have and the fact that she wanted to play this role was amazing. She elevated Mrs. Tingle to a new level."

Of her casting, Mirren said: "This is not the sort of film that I'm usually associated with, so I was thrilled that Kevin would think of me for this role." Mirren commented: "For me Teaching Mrs. Tingle addresses teenagers' insecurities, ambitions, and fears about the future. Remembering back to the ages of Leigh Ann, Luke, and Jo Lynn, fear of the future is the most powerful thing driving you on. You don't know what's going to happen to you and it's terrifying. I think adults forget how scary that is."

=== Filming ===
Production began in April 1998 on a budget of $14 million. The film was entirely shot in the Los Angeles area and wrapped in July 1998. The fictional Grandsboro High School was a combination of location work filmed at Rose City High School in Pasadena, Culver City High School in Culver City, and sound stage sets at Culver Studios. Exterior shots of Mrs. Tingle's house took place at a Victorian-style residence in Pasadena.

=== Controversy ===
Originally called Killing Mrs. Tingle, the film was intended to have an earlier release date and an R rating. Its overall tone was darker, with certain characters being killed off. Holmes' character, Leigh Ann, was also much less sympathetic; in a 2023 interview, Williamson revealed the character was supposed to be a "take no prisoners" type of person, who had no issue with people dying if it meant accomplishing her goals.

Owing to the Columbine High School massacre that occurred on April 20, 1999—and the ensuing public outcry over the portrayal of violence in the media—the re-titled film was pushed back to August, with certain scenes being reshot or re-edited to earn a PG-13 rating.

== Reception ==
=== Critical response ===
On Rotten Tomatoes, it has an approval rating of 19% based on 69 reviews, with an average score of 4/10. The site's critics consensus reads: "As a dark comedy-thriller, this movie lacks humor and thrill." On Metacritic, the film scored 35 out of 100 based on 32 critics, indicating "generally unfavorable reviews".

Roger Ebert gave the film one and a half stars and compared the film to Election in its concept, but said that Teaching Mrs. Tingle fell short of Election in wit, and in that Teaching Mrs. Tingle had no sympathetic characters; although he complimented Mirren's acting. Common Sense Media gave the film one star of out of five, calling it a "misguided teen thriller". There were some positive reviews for the film. Thom Bennett of Film Journal International praised the film, calling it "an entertaining film full of Williamson's familiar movie-reference-laced dialogue". Michael Dequina of The Movie Reporter gave the film three out of four stars, calling it "admittedly junky but wickedly watchable revenge fantasy".

=== Box office ===
The film was a box-office bomb; it made US$3.3 million in its opening weekend, debuting at number 10 at the North American box office. However, by its second week, the film dropped down to number 15 and brought in $2,344,298. The film continued to drop, and on its final week in the box office, the film was at number 44. By the end of its run, the film grossed $8,951,935 at the domestic box office against an estimated budget of $13 million.

== Music ==
=== Soundtrack ===
Teaching Mrs. Tingle: Music from the Dimension Motion Picture

Soundtrack album by various artists
- Released: August 17, 1999
- Genre: Post-grunge
- Length: 44:37
- Labels: Capitol; EMI

The original motion picture soundtrack was released by Capitol Records on August 17, 1999. The album features music from Eve 6, The Moffatts, Stretch Princess, Tara MacLean, Duncan Sheik, Kendall Payne, Sozzi, Bree Sharp, Radford, and Eman.

Teaching Mrs. Tingle: Music from the Dimension Motion Picture
No.	Title	Writer(s)	Artist	Length
1.	"Sorry"	Elizabeth Cutler, Jo Lloyd, David Magee and James Wright	Stretch Princess	3:30
2.	"Tongue Tied"	Max Collins, Tony Fagenson and Jonathan Siebels	Eve 6	3:12
3.	"If I Fall"	Tara MacLean	Tara MacLean	4:09
4.	"'Til I Cry You out of Me"	Jonnie Most	Sozzi	4:09
5.	"Wonderland"	Kendall Payne	Kendall Payne	3:42
6.	"I Shut Down"	Emanuel Kiriakou	Eman	4:20
7.	"Fall At Your Feet"		Radford	4:27
8.	"Show Me"	Simon Austin, Mike Rogers and Bree Sharp	Bree Sharp	3:59
9.	"Alibi"	Duane Lavold and Duncan Sheik	Duncan Sheik	4:10
10.	"Misery"	Klaus Major Heuser, Bob Moffatt, Clint Moffatt, Dave Moffatt and Scott Moffatt	The Moffatts	4:51
11.	"At Seventeen"	Janis Ian	Tara MacLean	4:08
Total length:				44:37

=== Score ===
Teaching Mrs. Tingle: Original Score From the Dimension Motion Picture

Soundtrack album by John Frizzell
- Released: August 24, 1999
- Genre: Soundtrack
- Length: 30:21
- Label: Varèse Sarabande

The score was composed by John Frizzell and was released as an album on August 24, 1999, by Varèse Sarabande.

Teaching Mrs. Tingle: Original Score From the Dimension Motion Picture
No.	Title	Length
1.	"The Incident At School"	2:02
2.	"Untie Me... Please"	2:15
3.	"The Crossbow Accident"	2:49
4.	"Get a Television, Mrs. Tingle"	1:08
5.	"Spanky Shows Up"	3:14
6.	"I Know You"	2:20
7.	"Caught Cheating"	1:38
8.	"My Mom Has Been Very Sick"	1:10
9.	"Luke Confides In Tingle"	2:31
10.	"Close Your Eyes"	1:21
11.	"Leigh Ann Crosses The Line"	1:42
12.	"I Don't Think So"	0:49
13.	"I'm Your Friend"	1:10
14.	"Destiny"	5:13
15.	"Triumph"	0:58
Total length:		30:21

== Home media ==
The film was released on DVD and VHS on December 21, 1999, by Dimension Home Video. As part of a deal with Miramax, Echo Bridge Home Entertainment released the film on Blu-ray on May 3, 2011. In April 2020, ViacomCBS (now known as Paramount Skydance) bought a 49% stake in Miramax from Qatari company beIN Media Group, which gave them the rights to the Miramax library and the pre-October 2005 Dimension library. They later made it available on their streaming service Paramount+, and on November 29, 2022, Paramount Home Entertainment reissued it on a double feature DVD with Tangled, another Dimension film they acquired the rights to.

Teaching Mrs. Tingle was released in several countries on Blu-ray, including the United Kingdom on June 25, 2012, by StudioCanal UK, Germany on June 7, 2012, by Studio Canal, France on July 3, 2012, by Studio Canal and Spain on November 30, 2011, by Emon Home Entertainment.

== Accolades ==
Year	Award	Category	Work	Result
2000	Saturn Award	Best Horror Film	Teaching Mrs. Tingle	Nominated
2000	MTV Movie Award	Best Kiss	Katie Holmes; Barry Watson	Nominated
2000	Teen Choice Award	Choice Movie Villain	Helen Mirren	Nominated
2000	Teen Choice Award	Choice Movie Chemistry	Katie Holmes; Barry Watson	Nominated

== See also ==
- Killing Mr. Griffin

== Bibliography ==
- Mangels, Andy (2000). From Scream to Dawson's Creek: An Unauthorized Take on the Phenomenal Career of Kevin Williamson. Renaissance Books. ISBN 9781580631228.
