= Choreography (disambiguation) =

Choreography may refer to:

- Choreography, the process and result of designing movement sequences
- Choreography (dance), the process and result of designing dances

== Computer science ==
- In choreographic programming, a programming paradigm in which programs are choreographies
- Service choreography, used in business computing

== Music ==
- Choreography (Bright Light Bright Light album)
- Choreography (Lauren Hoffman album)
- Choreography (Vanessa-Mae album)
- "Choreography", a song by Irving Berlin

== Other ==
- N-body choreography, a solution to a particular case of the n-body problem in classical mechanics
- Service choreography, web services-related computing terminology

== See also ==
- "Choreographed" (Law & Order: Special Victims Unit), a TV episode
