= Jai Waetford (EP) =

Jai Waetford EP

EP by Jai Waetford
- Released: 6 December 2013
- Recorded: 2013
- Genre: Pop
- Label: Sony

Singles from Jai Waetford EP
- 1. "Your Eyes" Released: 1 November 2013

Jai Waetford is the debut EP by Australian singer Jai Waetford. It was released in Australia as a digital download on 6 December 2013. The EP includes the single "Your Eyes". It has peaked to number 21 on the ARIA Albums Chart.

== Singles ==
- "Your Eyes" was released as the lead single from the EP on 1 November 2013. The song has peaked to number six on the ARIA Singles Chart.

== Track listing ==
No.	Title	Writer(s)	Length
1.	"Your Eyes"	Louis Schoorl; Hayley Warner; Alex Hope	3:52
2.	"Don't Let Me Go"	Jai Waetford	3:07
3.	"Fix You"	Chris Martin; Jonny Buckland; Guy Berryman; Will Champion	4:01
4.	"Plans"	Birds of Tokyo	3:27
5.	"The Only Exception"	Hayley Williams; Josh Farro	3:28
6.	"When a Child Is Born" (featuring Ronan Keating)		3:59

== Chart performance ==
=== Weekly charts ===
Chart (2013)	Peak position
Australian Albums (ARIA)	21

=== Year-end charts ===
Chart (2013)	Position
Australian Artist Albums Chart	42

== Release history ==
Region	Date	Format	Label
Australia	6 December 2013	Digital download	Sony Music Entertainment Australia
