= Your Eyes (Jai Waetford song) =

Single by Jai Waetford

from the album Jai Waetford
- Released: 1 November 2013
- Recorded: 2013
- Genre: Pop, R&B
- Length: 3:51
- Label: Sony
- Songwriters: Louis Schoorl; Hayley Warner; Alex Hope
- Producer: Louis Schoorl

Jai Waetford singles chronology
"Your Eyes" (2013)	"Get to Know You" (2014)

"Your Eyes" is the debut single by season five second runner-up of The X Factor Australia, Jai Waetford. It was released digitally by Sony Music Australia on 1 November 2013 as the lead single from his debut EP Jai Waetford (2013). The song peaked at number six on the ARIA Singles Chart and was certified Gold by the Australian Recording Industry Association for selling over 35,000 copies.

== Background and release ==
"Your Eyes" was written by Louis Schoorl, Hayley Warner and Alex Hope, and produced by Schoorl. It would have been Waetford's winner's single for the fifth season of The X Factor, if he had won the show. However, Waetford finished in third place. On 1 November 2013, it was announced that Waetford signed a recording contract with Sony Music Australia, and "Your Eyes" was released digitally as his debut single later that day. A CD single will be released on 8 November. The song debuted and peaked at number six on the ARIA Singles Chart on 9 November 2013.

== Live performances ==
Waetford performed "Your Eyes" live for the first time during The X Factor grand final performance show on 27 October 2013.

== Track listing ==
CD / digital download
No.	Title	Length
1.	"Your Eyes"	3:51

== Charts ==
=== Weekly charts ===
Chart (2013)	Peak position
Australia (ARIA)	6

=== Year-end charts ===
Chart (2013)	Position
Australian Artist Singles Chart	39

== Certifications ==
Region	Certification	Certified units/sales
Australia (ARIA)	Gold	35,000^{^}
^{^} Shipments figures based on certification alone.

== Release history ==
Country	Date	Format	Label	Catalogue
Australia	1 November 2013	Digital download	Sony Music Australia	
Australia	8 November 2013	CD	Sony Music Australia	88843013152
