= Jai Waetford =

Australian musician

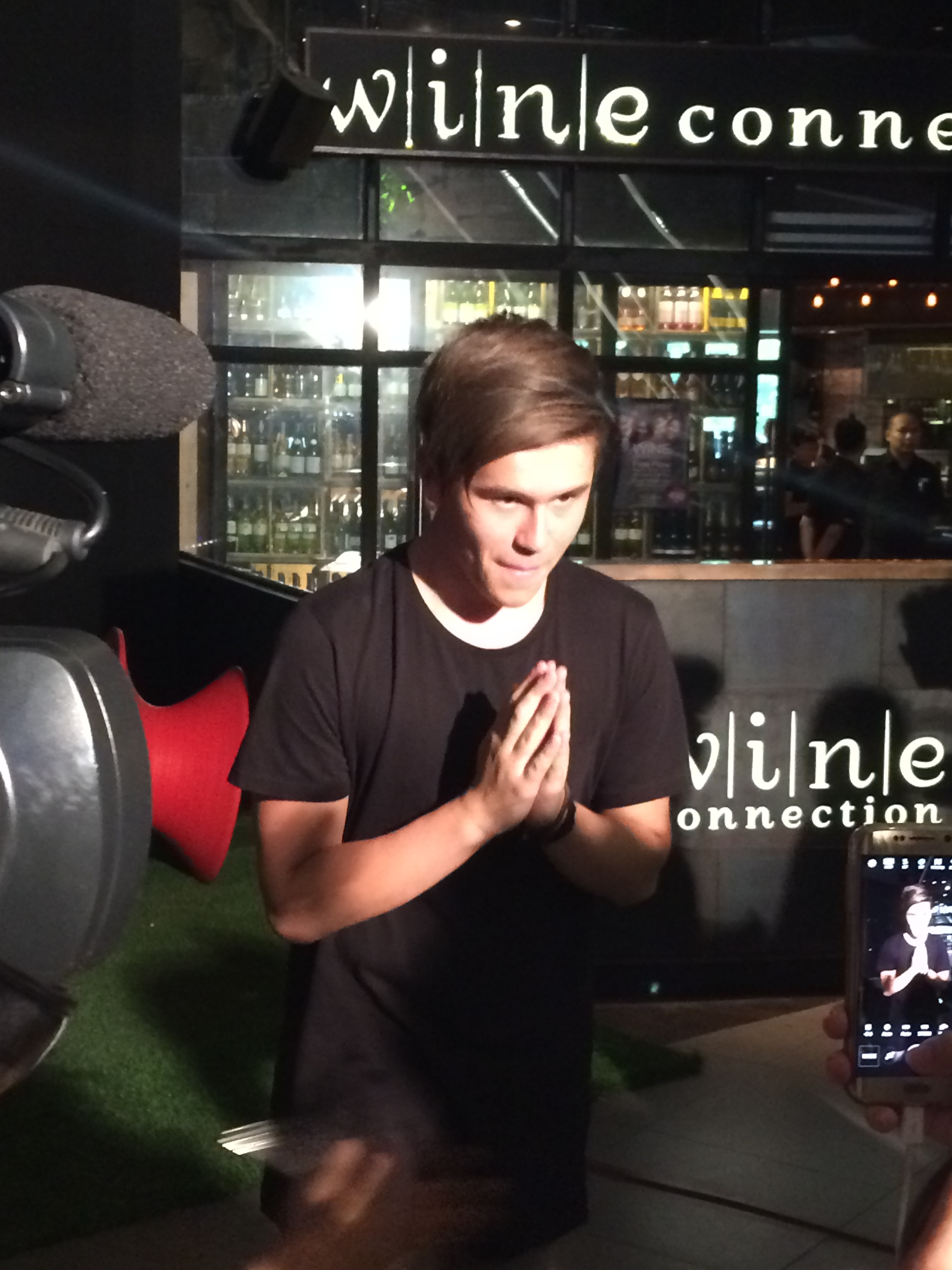
- Jai Waetford in 2016

Background information
- Born: 25 January 1999 (age 27); Campbelltown, New South Wales
- Genre: Pop
- Occupations: Singer; songwriter; actor
- Instruments: Vocals; guitar
- Years active: 2013–present
- Label: Sony
- Website: www.jaiwaetfordofficial.com
- Height: 178 cm (70 in)

Jai Ethan Waetford (born 25 January 1999) is an Australian pop singer and songwriter who was the last contestant eliminated on the fifth season of The X Factor Australia. He subsequently signed with Sony Music Australia and released his debut single "Your Eyes", which peaked at number six on the ARIA Singles Chart. Waetford's self-titled debut EP was released in December 2013 and peaked at number 21 on the ARIA Albums Chart. Waetford joined the Australian soap opera Neighbours in February 2016 as Angus Beaumont-Hannay; his debut episode aired on 2 May. His latest EP Heart Miles was released 3 June 2016.

== Early life ==
Jai Waetford was born in 1999 and is from Campbelltown, a suburb in south-western Sydney, New South Wales, Australia. He was raised by his mother Alana Dow and grandparents Hannah and Roger Dow. At a young age, Waetford's father left him and his mother. He taught himself how to play guitar from watching videos on YouTube. He was educated at Campbelltown Performing Arts High School and left school in 2014 after completing Year 10.

== Music career ==
=== 2013: The X Factor Australia ===
In 2013, Waetford auditioned for the fifth season of The X Factor Australia, singing "Different Worlds" by Jes Hudak and an original song titled "Don't Let Me Go". He progressed to the super bootcamp stage of the competition. On the first day of super bootcamp, Waetford performed "Titanium" by David Guetta and advanced to the second stage of super bootcamp, where he sang "Last Request" by Paulo Nutini. On the final day of super bootcamp, Waetford performed "We Are Never Ever Getting Back Together" by Taylor Swift to the judges and a live audience of one thousand. He made it through to the home visits round and was put into the Boys category, which was mentored by Ronan Keating. At the home visits, he sang Elvis Presley's version of "Always on My Mind" and made it through to the live shows. Waetford went on to reach the grand final, being the last contestant eliminated, behind Taylor Henderson (who was runner-up) and Dami Im (who won the show).

denotes a performance that entered the ARIA Singles
denotes eliminated

==== Performances on The X Factor ====
| Show | Song choice | Original Artist | Theme | Result |
|---|---|---|---|---|
| Auditions | "Different Worlds" | Jes Hudak | —N/a | Through to Super bootcamp |
| Auditions | "Don't Let Me Go" | Jai Waetford | —N/a | Through to Super bootcamp |
| Super bootcamp | "Titanium" | David Guetta ft. Sia | —N/a | Through to Home visits |
| Super bootcamp | "We Are Never Getting Back Together" | Taylor Swift | —N/a | Through to Home visits |
| Home visits | "Always On My Mind" | Elvis Presley | —N/a | Through to Live shows |
| Week 1 | "Fix You" | Coldplay | Judges' Choice | Safe |
| Week 2 | "I Want to Hold Your Hand" | The Beatles | Legends | Safe |
| Week 3 | "The Way You Make Me Feel" | Michael Jackson | Top 10 Hits | Safe |
| Week 4 | "It Will Rain" | Bruno Mars | Latest and Greatest | Safe |
| Week 5 | "Drops of Jupiter" | Train | Rock | Safe |
| Week 6 | "That Should Be Me" | Justin Bieber | Family Heroes | Safe |
| Week 7 | "Somewhere Only We Know" | Lily Allen | Judges' Challenge | Safe |
| Week 8 | "Plans" | Birds of Tokyo | Aussie Week | Safe |
| Week 9 | "I Won't Give Up" | Jason Mraz | Power and Passion | Safe |
| Week 9 | "Dynamite" | Taio Cruz | Power and Passion | Safe |
| Week 10 | "Don't Let Me Go" | Jai Waetford | Audition song | Eliminated (3rd place) |
| Week 10 | "The Only Exception" | Paramore | Last shot song | Eliminated (3rd place) |
| Week 10 | "Your Eyes" | Waetford | Winner's single | Eliminated (3rd place) |

=== 2013: Jai Waetford EP and Get to Know You ===
After The X Factor ended Waetford signed a recording contract with Sony Music Australia. His debut single "Your Eyes", which would have been his winner's single if he had won The X Factor, was released that same day. The song peaked at number six on the ARIA Singles Chart and was certified gold by the Australian Recording Industry Association for sales exceeding 35,000 copies. On 23 November 2013, Waetford toured alongside Third Degree, Taylor Henderson, Dami Im and Jiordan Tolli for The X Factor Live Tour, which ended on 2 December 2013. On 6 December 2013, he released his self-titled debut EP, which peaked at number 21 on the ARIA Albums Chart. Waetford's second EP, Get to Know You, was released on 28 March 2014. Its title track was released as a single and peaked at number 32 on the ARIA Singles Chart. Waetford served as the supporting act for Justice Crew's #HypeTour in April 2014 around Australia. Waetford's third EP, Shy consisted of six covers and one single.

=== 2016–2017: "Living Not Dreaming" and Heart Miles ===
He released the single "Living Not Dreaming" in February 2016. followed by the EP Heart Miles which was released 3 June 2016. Music videos have been recorded for both 'Living Not Dreaming' and 'Heart Miles' as well as a promotional video called Heart Miles EP which shows Jai discussing a long-distance relationship featuring snippets of each of the new songs from his EP. Jai toured a variety of cities to promote his new work across Europe, Indonesia and Thailand in May and June 2016, during which he performed his new material as well as covers of Drake's single "One Dance" and Justin Bieber's "Love Yourself".

=== 2018: Return to music, "Lost in You", "Get Over" and "Friends" ===
In October 2018, Waetford released his first single in a year, titled "Lost in You". Waetford said: "I wrote 'Lost in You' about someone who I met in a dark time that captivated me to a point where my life suddenly revolved around this person. When I was writing this, it was strange to me because I found myself involving her in everything I did; I was living for someone else." Waetford spoke candidly about his past mental health struggles, in an interview with the Herald Sun, saying he "couldn't find happiness in anything".

After sharing his mental health struggles in a candid social media post in August, Waetford was approached by the Australian Suicide Prevention Foundation to become an ambassador for their You Are Not Alone campaign.

Waetford then released the singles "Get Over" and "Friends", which premiered with urban music outlet Complex. "Friends" is co-written by Waetford with James Agnus (Carmouflage Rose, Tigerilla, Tkay Maidza) who also produced the record. "James and I were trying to find a sound that mashed urban drums with pop instrumentation and vocal melody," explains Jai of the collaboration. "We then stumbled across this beat James had made a while back, ran with it, and ended up really digging the result." "'Friends' is all about the online world and the real world colliding. Often we say things online that we wouldn't say in real life, and 'Friends' is about a situation where that happened to me".

== Artistry ==
Aside from singing, Waetford also plays guitar and writes his own songs. He cites Justin Bieber, Bruno Mars, Guy Sebastian, Michael Jackson, Elvis Presley and Stevie Wonder as his musical influences.

== Concert tours ==
Headlining

- The X Factor Live Tour (2013)
- 'Drunk Together' Tour (2017)
- 'Friends' Tour (2019)

Supporting

- Justice Crew's #HypeTour (2014)
- Little Mix's The Get Weird Tour (2016)
- Selena Gomez's Revival Tour (2016)

Joining

- Amplify Live Australian Tour #Amplifylive

== Discography ==
=== Extended plays ===
| Title | EP details | Peak chart positions |
| Title | EP details | AUS |
|---|---|---|
| Jai Waetford | Released: 6 December 2013; Label: Sony Music Australia; Formats: CD, digital download | 21 |
| Get to Know You | Released: 28 March 2014; Label: Sony Music Australia; Formats: CD, digital download | — |
| Shy | Released: 16 January 2015; Label: Sony Music Australia; Formats: CD, digital download | — |
| Heart Miles | Released: 3 June 2016; Label: Sony Music Australia; Formats: CD, digital download | 24 |
| Figure It Out | Released: 24 May 2019; Label: Sony Music Australia; Formats: CD, digital download | — |
"—" denotes an EP that did not chart.

=== Charting singles ===
| Year | Title | Peak chart positions | Certifications | Album/EP |
| Year | Title | AUS | Certifications | Album/EP |
|---|---|---|---|---|
| 2013 | "Your Eyes" | 6 | ARIA: Gold | Jai Waetford |
| 2014 | "Get to Know You" | 32 | | Get to Know You |

=== Other charted songs ===
| Year | Title | Peak chart positions |
| Year | Title | AUS |
|---|---|---|
| 2013 | "Fix You" | 55 |
| 2013 | "The Way You Make Me Feel" | 97 |
| 2013 | "That Should Be Me" | 83 |
| 2013 | "Somewhere Only We Know" | 95 |
| 2013 | "Dynamite" | 89 |
| 2013 | "Don't Let Me Go" | 37 |

=== Album appearances ===
| Year | Title | Album |
|---|---|---|
| 2014 | "White Christmas" | The Spirit of Christmas 2014 |

=== Music videos ===
| Year | Title | Director |
|---|---|---|
| 2014 | "Get to Know You" | |
| 2015 | "Shy" | |
| 2016 | "Living Not Dreaming" | Nick Waterman |
| 2016 | "Heart Miles" | |

== Awards and nominations ==
| Year | Type | Award | Result |
|---|---|---|---|
| 2013 | Poprepublic.tv Awards | Favourite Australian Male Artist/Breakthrough Artist of 2013 | Nominated |
| 2017 | TV Week Logie Award | Best New Talent | Nominated |
| 2017 | Kids' Choice Award | Favourite #Famous | Nominated |
