= Nancy Falkow =

American singer-songwriter

Nancy Falkow (April 22, 1970, in Atlantic City, New Jersey – January 6, 2020 in Dublin, Ireland) was an American singer/songwriter and musician from Philadelphia.

== Biography ==
Falkow grew up in Margate City, New Jersey, as part of a Jewish family and at sixteen took first prize for writing in the National Foundation for Advancement in the Arts. After graduating high school in 1988, she graduated from Temple University with a BA, and from Beaver College with an MA. At Temple, she met Mark Getten who later introduced her to Scot Sax, (who both went on to be involved in a number of bands including Wanderlust (band) and Feel). They encouraged her musical and songwriting efforts and spurred her into pursuing Philly area gigs which culminated in recording a 5-song EP (produced by Scot Sax) in 1997 which gained many favorable reviews.

On the strength of this, Nancy won a local talent search for Sarah McLachlan's Lilith Fair festival, winning one of 14 slots on the tour. The prize saw her sharing the stage with Sarah McLachlan and the Indigo Girls.

From this many opportunities followed, doing background vocals for artists such as Astrud Gilberto and G. Love & Special Sauce. Nancy combined her day job at Indre Recording Studios with time to record her first full-length album "Smitten" (produced by Emmy-winning engineer and multi-instrumentalist Shane McMartin). The album was greeted by many positive reviews including Billboard Magazine which singled her out by saying,

Falkow is writing infectious pop/folk songs with palpable soul.

The song "It Could've Been Anyone" from Smitten made it to the soundtrack of the movie Emmett's Mark, starring Tim Roth and Gabriel Byrne.

A string of nominations in previous years from the Philadelphia City Paper Music Awards resulted in a win in 2002, as Best Singer-Songwriter/Folk Performer. A number of notable gigs confirmed Nancy as a fixture on the Philadelphia music scene. The highlight of her career occurred when she toured with Daniel Lanois as a background vocalist on his "Shine" tour of the east coast in 2003. Nancy also was the main female vocalist with Mike Brenner's slide guitar hip-hop hybrid "Slo-Mo" and appeared extensively on their second album "My Buzz Comes Back". By 2003, Nancy was busy recording and co-producing (with McMartin) her second album "Clear View," which she released in 2004.

This brought a close to the Philadelphia chapter of her career as Nancy relocated to Dublin, Ireland in 2004. With marriage, a baby daughter and a chance meeting on a train, Nancy started a new project called "Sunflow" in 2006 with Dublin singer/songwriter Fran King, an album of lullabies followed called "Under The Stars" (2008) produced by Duncan Maitland. In 2010 "I Wish You Love" from that album featured in an episode of "Life UneXpected" and in a Toyota Prius commercial.

In December 2012 Falkow reunited with Producer Duncan Maitland and recorded the single "What I'm Doing Right," which was released December 1, with initial proceeds to benefit the Irish charity The Jack & Jill Children's Foundation.

She married Frankie McBride in 2005, and they had a daughter, Hannah, in 2006. Falkow died of ovarian cancer on January 5, 2020.

== Discography ==
- "What I'm Doing Right" - Single Produced by Duncan Maitland 2012
- Under the Stars - with the band Sunflow Produced by Duncan Maitland 2008
- Clear View – Produced by Falkow and McMartin 2004
- Smitten – Produced by Shane McMartin 2000
- Nancy Falkow – 5-song E.P. – Produced by Scot Sax 1997

== Songs on other compilations and recordings ==
- "1921" – Facedown Records tribute to The Who - Who's Forgotten
- "My Head is Only in My House When it Rains" – Genus Records tribute to Captain Beefheart- Mama Kangaroos

== Notable vocal appearances ==
- Wood - Songs from Stamford Hill (Columbia)
- G Love & Special Sauce - Electric Mile (Epic/Okeh!)
- Astrud Gilberto - Jungle (Magya Productions)
- Shirley Caesar/Patti LaBelle duet – on "You are My Friend" (Word Entertainment)
- Marah - 20,000 Streets Under the Sky (Yep Roc Records)
- Slo-Mo - My Buzz Comes Back (PHIdelity)
- Slo-Mo - Smokey Mountain (PHIdelity)
- Daniel Lanois – Live from the World Café appearance March 2003
