= Shannon Worrell =

American singer

- Origin: Charlottesville, Virginia, US
- Genres: Rock; Folk
- Occupations: Singer-songwriter, musician
- Instruments: Vocals, guitar
- Years active: 1991–present
- Labels: The Enclave; Super Duke Records

Shannon Worrell is a singer-songwriter based in Charlottesville, Virginia. Known for a series of critically acclaimed albums in the 1990s culminating with an appearance (as September 67) on the Lilith Fair tour and for collaborations with fellow Charlottesville-based musicians Dave Matthews and Tim Reynolds, Worrell's acoustic songwriting has been described as "subtly orchestrated chamber pop" and "like a lean country cousin of the Throwing Muses."

== Early career and Three Wishes ==
Worrell grew up in Charlottesville in a prominent local media family; her grandfather, Gene Worrell, founded a Worrell Newspapers in Bristol, Virginia in the 1940's, which grew to include the Charlottesville Daily Progress and 30+ more dailies and weeklies. She graduated from the University of Virginia in 1990 and stayed in Charlottesville, participating in the local music scene.

Worrell played in a band called Paris Match while earning an undergraduate degree in Religious Studies at UVA , but left to work as a solo artist sometime after 1991. She played in various locations around Charlottesville's Downtown Mall for several years; in particular, she jammed with Haines Fullerton (formerly of local band the Deal), Tim Reynolds, and Dave Matthews on several occasions. All three would subsequently perform on her solo recordings.

Worrell's first album, Three Wishes, was released in 1994 on her own label, Super Duke Records. The album, co-produced by John Alagia, was recorded in a basement studio in Northern Virginia and comprises nine original songs. Collaborators on the album included Tim Reynolds, the Dave Matthews Band's LeRoi Moore, and Matthews himself, who sang backing vocals on "Eleanor and See Jane" Haines Fullerton participated as well, writing vocal arrangements for the album.

== Monsoon and September 67 ==
Between 1995 and 1998, Worrell collaborated with a number of Charlottesville area musicians in various group settings. The first to form was a trio collaboration with Kristin Asbury and Lauren Hoffman initially called Monsoon. During this time period, the group appeared on the Dear Charlottesville compilation to support the local club scene.

Initially, all three members were contributors to Monsoon. However, Hoffman ultimately decided she wanted to go her own way and left the band, eventually signing a contract with Virgin Records. Worrell and Asbury continued as a duo under the name September 67. The group signed to The Enclave, an indie label affiliated with EMI, and released the album Lucky Shoe at the end of 1996. Lucky Shoe was produced by David Lowery of Camper Van Beethoven and Cracker and featured contributions from Bryan Harvey, John Alagia (who co-wrote "Little Lantern Face"), and the backing musicians from Sparklehorse.

The tour behind Lucky Shoe saw them supporting Wilco's "Being There" tour, and participating in Lilith Fair '97. During the Lilith Fair tour, the group recorded a live song called "Steve Malkmus is a Fucking Snob," which appeared as a non-album track on the EP "What's Wrong with Alice." The song earned the band some controversy and a mention in Rolling Stone.

When The Enclave was acquired by Virgin Records, Worrell's contract was not picked up, and the band made the decision to go their separate ways.

== The Moviegoer, hiatus, and new album ==
Post September 67, Worrell returned to the studio to record a follow-up album. The Moviegoer, released in April 2000 on her Super Duke label, saw her collaborating again with Kristin Asbury, Bryan Harvey; the album features John Stirratt on bass, John Linnell on accordion and was produced by his wife, Karen Brown. Worrell took time off from music after the release of the album to raise her children and start Light House Studio, a non-profit media education center for Charlottesville youth.

At the end of 2007, Worrell began performing publicly again, playing supporting gigs for Charlottesville band Sons of Bill. In 2008, she entered the studio to record her first album in eight years, The Honey Guide. The album was released in October 2008, and was a featured pick on the iTunes folk store.

In 2009, Worrell wrote original music for "Our American Ann Sisters", performed at Live Arts by PEP (Performers' Exchange Project), written by Martha Mendenhall.

In 2018, Kristin Hott and Worrell's band, September 67, performed a 20th reunion concert to benefit The Bridge Progressive Arts Initiative in Charlottesville, Virginia.

== Discography ==
=== Albums ===
- Shannon Worrell: Three Wishes (CD). Super Duke Records (1994).
- September 67: Lucky Shoe (LP, CD). The Enclave/Super Duke (1996).
- Shannon Worrell: The Moviegoer (CD). Super Duke Records (2000).
- Shannon Worrell: The Honey Guide (CD/digital). Dualtone (2008).

=== Singles and EPs ===
- Shannon Worrell (four-track cassette EP). Super Duke (1994).
- Monsoon (cassette/vinyl). Self-released (1995).
- September 67, Busy Building (3-track UK CD single). The Enclave/Virgin (1996).

=== Promotional singles, EPs, and LPs ===
- Shannon Worrell & Kristen Asbury (four-track Lucky Shoe Sampler CD, DPRO-11700). The Enclave (1996).
- September 67: Lucky Shoe (Advance Promo CD, DPRO-11703). The Enclave/Super Duke (1996).
- September 67, Busy Building (1-track UK CD single, VSCDJ 1627). The Enclave/Virgin (1996).
- September 67, Busy Building (2-track US CD single, DPRO-11704). The Enclave (1996).
- September 67, Busy Building (1-track US 45). The Enclave (1996).
- September 67, What's Wrong with Alice (4-track CD EP, DPRO-11718). The Enclave (1997).
- Shannon Worrell: The Moviegoer (Advance Promo CD in card-sleeve, inc. booklet with alternate silver cover printing). Super Duke Records (2000).

=== Appearances in compilations ===
- Dear Charlottesville as Shannon Worrell and Monsoon (1995). "Hazel Motes."
- Lilith Fair: A Celebration of Women in Music (CD, 1998). "Long Distance Runner."
- Aware II (CD, 1994). "Eleanor" & “Not Athena”
- "Aware IV" "Movie Star Mom"
- "Aware's Greatest Hits"

=== Appearances in promotional compilations ===
- The Enclave Music Sampler SXSW 97 (CD). The Enclave (1997). "What's Wrong With Alice"
- Fired Up – Badge New Music: Vol 1 (CD). EMI/Capitol Records (1997). "Busy Building"
