= Kendall Payne =

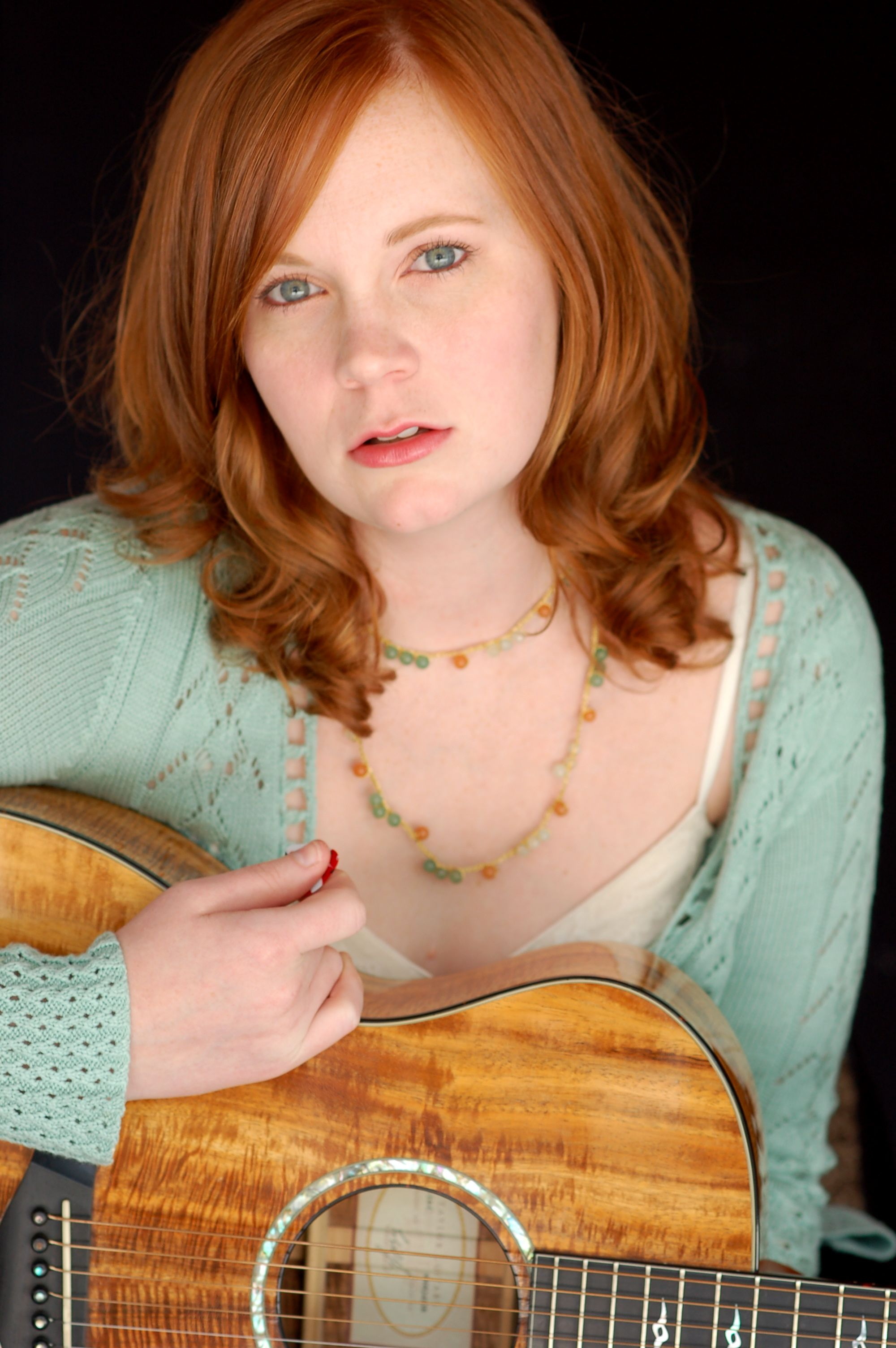

Background information
- Born: Kendall Payne Tschudi; April 10, 1980 (age 45); Santa Monica, California, United States
- Occupation(s): Singer, songwriter, multi-instrumentalist
- Instrument(s): Singing, multiple instruments
- Years active: 1999–present
- Website: kendallpayne.com

Kendall Payne is a singer-songwriter recording artist who was born in Santa Monica, California and raised in nearby Malibu. When she was a teenager, Payne signed a recording contract with Capitol Records, which released her first album, Jordan's Sister, in 1999. Her second album, Grown, was executive produced by her friend Zachary Levi and released independently in 2004. Over the next five years, Payne released four more albums independently. She spent two years on the Lilith Fair tour with Sarah McLachlan and has also toured with Dido, Ron Sexsmith, Third Day, Switchfoot, and Delirious?. From 2014 to 2018 she served as the Senior Director of Contemporary Worship at Bel Air Church (also known as Bel Air Presbyterian Church).

== Awards ==
At the 32nd Annual GMA Dove Awards in 2001, Payne won the award for Modern Rock Album of the Year for her debut album Jordan's Sister. In 2007, her songwriting was further recognized when she received The ASCAP Foundation Sammy Cahn Award.

== Discography ==
- 1999 – Jordan's Sister
- 2004 – Grown
- 2007 – Paper Skin
- 2008 – That's Why There's Grace (Worship album)
- 2008 – December (Holiday album)
- 2009 – Wounds to Scars
- 2021 – Raw

== Television and film ==
Payne's music has been used in films and television shows including her song "Supermodels," which was the theme song for The WB Television Network's teen dramedy Popular.

Album	Song	Movie or TV series
Jordan's Sister (1999)	"Closer to Myself"	Never Been Kissed (1999)
Jordan's Sister (1999)	"Closer to Myself"	Someone Like You (2001)
Jordan's Sister (1999)	"Supermodels"	Popular (1999–2001)
Jordan's Sister (1999)	"Wonderland"	Teaching Mrs. Tingle (1999)
Jordan's Sister (1999)	"The Second Day"	Beautiful (2000)
Jordan's Sister (1999)	"On My Bones"	Mysterious Ways (2000–2002)
Jordan's Sister (1999)	"Never Leave"	Cupid (1998–99)
Grown (2004)	"Scratch"	Felicity (Senior Year Soundtrack)
Grown (2004)	"Scratch"	Grey's Anatomy (2006)
Grown (2004)	"Scratch"	Kyle XY (2006)
Grown (2004)	"Scratch"	Grey's Anatomy (2007)
Grown (2004)	"Rollercoaster"	Pepper Dennis (2006)
Paper Skin (2007)	"I Will Show You Love"	Grey's Anatomy (2007)

== Publications ==
In addition to her music, Payne has published two books. The first book, Mirror, Mirror: Reflections on Who You Are and Who You'll Become, was co-authored with Kara Powell and published in 2003 by Zondervan. Her second book, Connect: The Lowdown on Friendships and Relationships, was published in 2005 by Regal Books.
