= Tekla (singer) =

Pernilla Sternäng (born Pernilla Sternäng, 4 March 1969 in Helsingborg), better known by her stage name Tekla, is a Swedish singer. She released four albums in the 1990s - two in Swedish and two in English on the MNW label in Sweden. Tekla's fourth album was released in 1999 on the Vancouver, British Columbia, Canada label Nettwerk. She toured with Sarah McLachlan on the 1999 Lilith Fair tour as one of the Village Stage artists.

Tekla left the music industry in the early 2000s and little is known of her since. She is reportedly living in Stockholm today.

== Discography ==
Oranga Blad (Orange leaves) 1992

Tekla 1994

Cactuses 1996

Somebody Else 1999
