= Lilith Fair: A Celebration of Women in Music =

Compilation album series

Lilith Fair: A Celebration of Women in Music is a series of three live compilation albums that collect performances from several years of the Lilith Fair festival tour.

== Volume 1 ==
Lilith Fair: A Celebration of Women in Music, Volume 1

Compilation album live by various artists
- Released: April 28, 1998
- Recorded: 1997
- Venue: various
- Genre: various
- Length: 103:02
- Language: English
- Label: Arista
- Producer: Terry McBride
- Compiler: Sarah McLachlan

Lilith Fair: A Celebration of Women in Music, Volume 1 was released in 1998 and served as a fundraiser for Lifebeat and the Rape, Abuse & Incest National Network. The recording was produced by Terry McBride and compiled over four months, going through recordings spanning the entire festival.

Writing for The A.V. Club, Stephen Thompson called this compilation "a mixed bag of promising performers... and practitioners of pneumatic, white-bread girly music..., with precious few highlights worth owning". Editors at AllMusic rated this album 3 out of 5 stars, with critic Stephen Thomas Erlewine writing that "while it doesn't dispel the notion that Lilith Fair was essentially a homogenous music festival, it does capture the feeling of the tour quite well, and it has some very good music" and it makes for "a nice souvenir" from the festival. A review for Entertainment Weekly rated this release a B−, noting criticisms about genre, lack of diversity, and individual performances, wrapping up that "the ultimate lesson to be gleaned is dispiritingly simple: As an album, Lilith is only fair".

Disc one

1. "Mississippi" (Paula Cole) by Paula Cole – 4:51
2. "Scooter Boys" (Amy Ray) by Indigo Girls – 3:27
3. "Sur Tes Pas" by Autour de Lucie – 3:25
4. "Been It" (lyrics: Nina Persson and Peter Svensson, music: Svensson) by The Cardigans – 4:06
5. "I Want" (Dayna Manning) by Dayna Manning – 4:45
6. "Four Leaf Clover" (Abra Moore) by Abra Moore – 4:31
7. "Falling in Love" (Lisa Loeb) by Lisa Loeb – 4:36
8. "Loneliness of the Long Distance Runner" (Shannon Worrell) by September '67 – 4:14
9. "El Payande" (Susan Urban) by Lhasa de Sela – 3:59
10. "Eternal Flame" (Susanna Hoffs, Tom Kelly, and Billy Steinberg) by Susanna Hoffs – 3:16
11. "Rock in This Pocket (Song of David)" (Suzanne Vega) by Suzanne Vega – 4:09
12. "Ladder" (Eric Bazilian, Rick Chertoff, Rob Hyman, and Joan Osborne) by Joan Osborne – 4:16
13. "Building a Mystery" (Pierre Marchand and Sarah McLachlan) by Sarah McLachlan – 4:25

Disc 2

14. "Water Is Wide" (traditional) by Sarah McLachlan, Indigo Girls, and Jewel – 4:18
15. "Going Back to Harlan" (Anna McGarrigle) by Emmylou Harris – 5:04
16. "Wash My Hands" (Meredith Brooks, Larry Dvoskin, and Shelly Pelken) by Meredith Brooks – 5:18
17. "Cain" (Patty Griffin) by Patty Griffin – 3:49
18. "I Don't Want to Think About It" (Kenneth Harrison) by Wild Strawberries – 4:02
19. "What Do You Hear in These Sounds" (Dar Williams) by Dar Williams – 3:52
20. "Trouble" (Shawn Colvin, John Leventhal, and Tom Littlefield) by Shawn Colvin – 4:08
21. "Lama Dorje Chang" (Yungchen Lhamo) by Yungchen Lhamo – 3:05
22. "The One" (Tracy Bonham) by Tracy Bonham – 4:38
23. "Charm" (Tony Berg, Jon Brion, Paul Cantelon, Angela McCluskey, and Scott Roewe) by Wild Colonials – 3:22
24. "Hold Me Jordan" (Tara MacLean) by Tara MacLean – 5:04
25. "Periwinkle Sky" (Victoria Williams) by Victoria Williams – 2:36

Additional personnel:

- Steve Addabbo – mixing
- Ray Coburn – mixing
- Susan Alzner – photography
- Cathy Barrett – photography
- Greg Calbi – mastering
- Angelique Crowther – artwork, design, photography
- Tom Davis – mixing
- Joe Ferla – mixing
- Jim Grant – associate production
- Gary L. Hacking – photography
- Fred Hayes – photography
- Crystal Heald – photography
- Steve Jennings – photography
- Steve Johnson – mixing assistance
- Amy Lehman – photography
- David Leonard – mixing
- David Leyes – photography
- Chris Lord-Alge – mixing
- Terry McBride – executive production
- Buddy Miller – mixing
- Brian Minato – photography
- Roger Moutenot – mixing
- Tim Oberthier – associate production, engineering, mixing
- Juan Patino – mixing
- Michelle Pedone – photography
- Mike Plotnikoff – mixing
- Neal Preston – photography
- Scott Roewe – engineering, mixing
- John Rummen – art direction, artwork, design
- Peter Shurkin – mixing assistance
- Vanessa Smith – photography
- A. W. Thomas – photography
- Rick "Soldier" Will – mixing
- Vanessa Williams – photography

== Volumes 2 and 3 ==
Lilith Fair: A Celebration of Women in Music, Volume 2

Compilation album live by various artists
- Released: May 18, 1999
- Recorded: 1998
- Venue: various
- Genre: various
- Length: 66:20
- Language: English
- Label: Arista

Lilith Fair: A Celebration of Women in Music, Volume 3

Compilation album live by various artists
- Released: May 18, 1999
- Recorded: 1998
- Venue: various
- Genre: various
- Length: 61:19
- Language: English
- Label: Arista

Lilith Fair: A Celebration of Women in Music, Volume 2 and 3 were released in 1999, alongside one another.

A review in Entertainment Weekly for the two discs by Beth Johnson rated them a B, calling them "a more compelling, less whiny, listen" than the first volume and praising the diversity represented in this music.

Volume 2:

1. "Fire on Babylon" (Sinéad O’Connor and John Reynolds) by Sinéad O’Connor – 7:28
2. "Never Know" by Angélique Kidjo – 4:52
3. "Life" by Queen Latifah – 5:28
4. "Island" by Heather Nova – 5:09
5. "New Thing Now" by Shawn Colvin – 3:46
6. "Angel" (Sarah McLachlan) by Sarah McLachlan with Emmylou Harris – 5:58
7. "The Sea" (Paul Godfrey, Ross Godfrey, and Skye Edwards) by Morcheeba – 5:19
8. "I Do" (Lisa Loeb) by Lisa Loeb – 3:45
9. "Sway" (Bic Runga) by Bic Runga – 3:14
10. "In the Ghetto" (Mac Davis) by Natalie Merchant with Meshell Ndegeocello – 4:13
11. "Miles from Our Home" (lyrics: Michael Timmins, music: Greg Clarke, Brodie Lodge, and Timmins) by Cowboy Junkies – 4:19
12. "Meat Hook" by Tracy Bonham – 3:14
13. "Elmo" by Holly McNarland – 5:41
14. "Trampoline" by Wild Strawberries – 3:52

Volume 3:

1. "Soul Record" (Ndegeocello) by Meshell Ndegeocello – 5:21
2. "Naked Eye" (Jill Cunniff, Kate Schellenbach, and Vivian Trimble) by Luscious Jackson – 4:16
3. "Never Said" (Liz Phair) by Liz Phair – 3:38
4. "Onion Girl" (Laura Harding and Jeff Hull) by Holly Cole – 4:20
5. "Kiss Me" (Matt Slocum) by Sixpence None the Richer – 3:17
6. "Luka" (Suzanne Vega) by Suzanne Vega – 3:20
7. "Black & White" (Sarah McLachlan) by Sarah McLachlan – 4:48
8. "Underneath a Red Moon" (N’Dea Davenport and Colin Wolfe) by N’Dea Davenport – 3:33
9. "Not an Addict" (Gert Bettens and Sam Bettens) by K’s Choice – 5:02
10. "Get Out the Map" (Emily Saliers) by Indigo Girls – 3:23
11. "Little Black Girl" (Rebekah) by Rebekah – 4:06
12. "Deeper Well" (Emmylou Harris, Daniel Lanois, and David Olney) by Emmylou Harris – 5:59
13. "Surrounded" (Chantal Kreviazuk) by Chantal Kreviazuk – 5:14
14. "Spit of Love" (Bonnie Raitt) by Bonnie Raitt – 5:01

== See also ==
- List of 1998 albums
- List of 1999 albums
