= Radford (band) =

American alternative rock band

- Origin: Los Angeles, California, U.S.
- Genres: Alternative rock
- Years active: 1997–2000; 2003–present
- Labels: RCA; Universal
- Members: Jonny Mead; Sean Woolstenhulme; Kane McGee; Soloman Snyder
- Past members: Chris Hower; Bobby Stefano
- Website: radfordband.com

Radford are an American alternative rock band from Los Angeles. Formed in 1997 by frontman Jonny Mead (lead vocals, guitar, keyboards), Chris Hower (guitar), Bobby Stefano (bass), and Kane McGee (drums), the band has undergone several line-up changes since its formation. The current lineup features Mead, McGee, guitarist Sean Woolstenhulme, and bassist Soloman Snyder.

The band signed to RCA Records in 1997 and released their self-titled debut studio album in 2000. Led by the single "Don't Stop", the band experienced moderate success on the Billboard Modern Rock chart, where the song peaked at number 32. The band also had several songs prominently featured in and on the soundtracks to the films Never Been Kissed, Teaching Mrs. Tingle, and Scary Movie. Following the corporate restructuring of RCA Records in the early 2000s, Radford was dropped from the label and broke up.

Following the band's breakup, Mead became reclusive and spent a year writing and recording songs in his home studio. These recordings secured him a recording contract with Universal Music, which resulted in the release of Sleepwalker in 2004 under the Radford moniker. Radford parted ways with Universal Music after the album's release. Mead then recruited Woolstenhulme, McGee, and Snyder as band members and they released an extended play titled Black Out the Sun in 2006.

== History ==
=== 1995–2000: Formation and Radford ===
In 1995, frontman Jonny Mead emigrated from Oxford, England, to Los Angeles, California. Mead relocated in hopes of "find[ing] a more open musical home" in the United States, as he believed that the music scene in England was too "self-important" at the time. Upon arrival, Mead became acquainted with guitarist Chris Hower and bassist Bobby Stefano while visiting a Guitar Center store. The three began to recreationally compose music together, which eventually led to the decision to form a band. The band circulated demos locally, which ultimately ended up in the possession of RCA Records' senior vice president Bruce Flohr in July 1998. Flohr was impressed over a song titled "Closer to You" and, after observing one of the band's rehearsals, convinced the label's president Bob Jamieson to sign the band. Radford signed to RCA Records in September 1998 and began to work on their debut studio album.

After signing to RCA, the band met drummer Kane McGee and discarded all of their prior recorded material in order to start fresh with this new, completed line-up. The album was written and composed by the band, while production was helmed by Paul Fox. The album was completed in May 1999, and its lead single was slated for a release in August 1999. However, RCA executives held off on releasing the album under the belief that the musical climate was not right for Radford's sound. In the lead-up to the album's release, two scrapped songs from the effort were featured on film soundtracks; "Stay" and "Fall at Your Feet" were included on the soundtracks to Never Been Kissed and Scary Movie and Teaching Mrs. Tingle, respectively. "Don't Stop" was eventually released to alternative radio as the band's debut single on February 8, 2000, with their self-titled debut studio album following on March 21, 2000. To promote the effort, Radford toured in the United States alongside Vertical Horizon and Stroke 9. Radford failed to attain any notable commercial success, although "Don't Stop" achieved some moderate success on the Billboard Modern Rock Tracks chart, where it peaked at number 32. A second single, "Closer to You", was released to alternative radio on July 18, 2000.

=== 2001–2004: Breakup, reformation, and Sleepwalker ===
"I really thought I was done with music after that. I remember feeling like I didn’t want to have anything more to do with the industry ever again."

—Jonny Mead talking to Alternative Addiction about the aftermath of the band's breakup.

As a part of the corporate restructuring of RCA Records, Radford was dropped from the label. The band was shocked with the label's decision and shortly made the decision to break up. Feeling disillusioned by the music industry, Mead became reclusive and spent the next year writing and recording music in his own home studio. Mead recorded over 30 songs, which ultimately secured him a recording contract with Universal Music. Ten of these songs comprised the record Sleepwalker, which was released on April 13, 2004, under the label. "Fake a Smile" was released to adult alternative radio as the album's lead single on September 22, 2003. Despite the album being a sole effort by Mead, it was still released under the Radford moniker.

=== 2005–2006: Black Out the Sun ===
Following the release of Sleepwalker, Radford parted ways with Universal Music. Rather than signing with another major music label, the band made the decision to independently release their music. On March 28, 2006, Radford released their first extended play, Black Out the Sun. The extended play was made available for digital download from Alternative Addiction and could be ordered in a physical format as a CD from the band's official website. Unlike the solitary recording process of Sleepwalker, Mead collectively worked on Black Out the Sun with the band's touring members from the previous two years. Radford never officially announced a second breakup, although they have not released any new music nor updates about the band since 2006.

== Musical style and influences ==
Billboard senior editor Chuck Taylor described the band's musical style as "neatly walk[ing] the line between the accessible teen appeal of [M]atchbox 20 and the more credible rock antics of Third Eye Blind." Mead compared Radford's music to songs by artists such as Radiohead, R.E.M., and the Verve. He commented: "[Y]ou can approach [their] music on more than one level. I think many of our songs are like that."

== Band members ==
Current members

- Jonny Mead – lead vocals, guitar, keyboards (1997–2000; 2003–present)
- Sean Woolstenhulme – guitar (2004–present)
- Kane McGee – drums (1997–2000; 2004–present)
- Soloman Snyder – bass (2004–present)

Former members

- Chris Hower – guitar (1997–2000)
- Bobby Stefano – bass (1997–2000)

== Discography ==
=== Studio albums ===
Title	Details
Radford	Released: March 21, 2000; Label: RCA; Format: CD
Sleepwalker	Released: April 13, 2004; Label: Universal; Format: CD

=== Extended play ===
Title	Details
Black Out the Sun	Released: March 28, 2006; Label: Self-released; Format: Digital download

=== Singles ===
Title	Year	Peak chart positions	Album
Title	Year	US Alt.	Album
"Don't Stop"	2000	32	Radford
"Closer to Myself"	2000	—	Radford
"Fake a Smile"	2003	—	Sleepwalker
"—" denotes a recording that did not chart or was not released in that territory.

=== Other appearances ===
Year	Song	Release
1999	"Fall at Your Feet"	Teaching Mrs. Tingle: Music from the Dimension Motion Picture
2000	"Stay"	Scary Movie: Music That Inspired the Soundtrack?
2001	"Sweet Summer"	Summer Catch: Music from the Motion Picture
