= Lucky Shoe =

Studio album by September '67
- Released: October 15, 1996
- Recorded: July, 1995 – January, 1996
- Studio: Sound of Music, Richmond, Virginia, US
- Genre: Alternative rock
- Length: 43:16
- Language: English
- Label: Capitol/The Enclave
- Producer: David Lowery; John Morand

Lucky Shoe is the only album by American alternative rock combo September '67. It has received positive reviews by critics.

== Reception ==
Editors at AllMusic rated this album 3 out of 5 stars, with critic JT Griffith writing this album "will appeal less to [fellow Virginia act Dave Mathews Band] than fans of the Blake Babies, Sheryl Crow, Shelby Lynne, Cracker folk, and roots rock who will find Lucky Shoe an inspired (and largely undiscovered) gem". Industry magazine Billboard included a review that called this album one that "deserves consideration at college, triple-A, and modern rock outlets". In CMJ New Music Monthly, Scott Burke wrote that songwriter Shannon Worrell "reveals her truths slowly, taking her time to warm up to you, in measured tones", resulting in music that is "more than sweetly catchy". A 2021 retrospective in Perfect Sound Forever by Kurt Wildermuth called this "an album to remember" for being "lovingly crafted yet unstuffy pop-rock with articulate lyrics, delicious melodies, copious hooks, velvety vocals, and textures you can feel-sort of synaesthetically, as though someone just ran a finger down your back" with "recording [that] is so eerily physical, you want to trace the instrumental lines in the air".

== Track listing ==
All songs written by Shannon Worrell, except where noted.

1. "Busy Building" – 4:09
2. "Setting the Old House on Fire" – 3:10
3. "Fire Engine Red" – 3:41
4. "Lucky Shoe" – 3:00
5. "What's Wrong with Alice" (Kristin Asbury and Worrell) – 3:34
6. "Giant" – 4:44
7. "Mercy Is the Red Bird" – 3:05
8. "Don't Break" – 3:23
9. "Hazel Motes" – 3:00
10. "Poor Boy" – 2:50
11. "Cassandra on the Dance Floor" – 3:54
12. "Little Lantern Face" (John Alagia and Worrell) – 1:06
13. "Bring Back the Weight" – 3:41

== Personnel ==
September '67

- Kristin Asbury – accordion, drums, harp, Wurlitzer, vocals
- Shannon Worrell – guitars, vocals

Additional personnel

- Jamie Coan – violin on "Lucky Shoe", mandolin on "Setting the Old House On Fire"
- John Crist – drums on "Lucky Shoe"
- Bryan Harvey – guitar on "Busy Building", "Setting the Old House On Fire", "Fire Engine Red", "Don't Break", "Poor Boy", and "Cassandra On the Dance Floor"; bass guitar on "Hazel Motes"; accordion on "Cassandra On the Dance Floor"; keyboards on "Cassandra On the Dance Floor"
- Richard Hasal – audio engineering
- Johnny Hickman – vocals on "Giant"
- David Immerglück – bass guitar on "Giant", pedal steel guitar on "Giant"
- Kelly Lonergan – design
- David Lowery – Mellotron on "Giant", drum machine on "Giant", production
- Micheal McLaughlin – photography
- John Morand – tambourine on "Busy Building", "What's Wrong with Alice", and "Poor Boy"; clapping on "Poor Boy"; drum machine on "Little Lantern Face"; production
- Charles Nill – guitar on "Fire Engine Red" and "Don't Break"
- Bob Rupe – bass guitar on "Mercy Is the Red Bird" and "Poor Boy", guitar
- Jonathan Sullivan – bass guitar on "Busy Building", "Setting the Old House On Fire", and "Fire Engine Red"
- Matt Tifford – cello on "Setting the Old House On Fire" and "What's Wrong with Alice"
- Rob Veal – bass guitar on "Lucky Shoe" and "What's Wrong with Alice"

== See also ==
- List of 1996 albums
