= Stretch Princess (album) =

Studio album by Stretch Princess
- Released: August 25th, 1998
- Genre: Alternative rock; Power pop
- Label: Wind-Up
- Producer: Sean Slade; Paul Q. Kolderie

Stretch Princess chronology
Stretch Princess (1998)	'Fun with Humans' (2002)

Stretch Princess is the debut studio album of English alternative rock band Stretch Princess. It was released on August 25th, 1998, through Wind-Up Records.

== Release ==
Stretch Princess was produced by Sean Slade and Paul Q. Kolderie, known for working with bands such as Hole and Radiohead, and released on August 25th, 1998.

The album spawned two singles: "Sorry" (1998) as its lead single and "Free" (1999). The former reached number 27 on Billboard's Adult Top 40 chart in 1999.

== Track listing ==
All music is composed by Stretch Princess.

No.	Title	Length
1.	"Oooh!"	2:41
2.	"Sorry"	3:34
3.	"Shoes"	3:44
4.	"Lost on Me"	3:37
5.	"Twisted"	3:36
6.	"Free"	3:36
7.	"Nice Thing"	4:21
8.	"Sugar"	3:08
9.	"J.W.B.A"	3:51
10.	"Heavy"	3:37
11.	"Universe"	4:51
Total length:		40:36

== Personnel ==
=== Stretch Princess ===
- Dave Magee - drums
- James Wright - guitar
- Jo Lloyd - vocals, bass

=== Additional personnel ===
- Andrew Southam - photography
- Bob Ludwig - mastering
- Chris Sheldon - mixing
- Mark Droescher - design
- Paul Q. Kolderie - producer
- Sean Slade - producer
