= Soundtrack 90210 =

Soundtrack album 90210 by Various
- Released: October 13, 2009
- Recorded: Various dates
- Genre: Soundtrack
- Language: English
- Label: CBS Records

Professional ratings
Review scores
Source	Rating
Allmusic	2.5/5 stars
Rock on Request	(favorable)

Soundtrack 90210 is the first soundtrack album from the television series 90210 since it relaunched in 2008. The album features 14 tracks that appeared in season two of 90210.

During production of the second season of 90210, executive producer Rebecca Sinclair and music supervisor Scott Vener listened to dozens of submitted tracks before choosing those they felt best suited to upcoming story-lines. The album features those songs that were selected.

The track listing on the compact disc version of the album mislabeled "I Want You So Bad I Can't Breathe" by OK Go as "I Want You So Bad" and "Understand" by Darrelle London as "Understood".

== Track list ==
No.	Title	Artist	Length
1.	"Many Shades of Black"	Adele & The Raconteurs	4:28
2.	"Soldier (feat. Santigold)"	N.E.R.D.	4:41
3.	"One Hipster One Bullit"	Jet	2:11
4.	"Valium"	Mutemath	4:22
5.	"I Want You So Bad I Can't Breathe"	OK Go	3:21
6.	"Sierra's Song"	The All-American Rejects	4:14
7.	"A Perfect Tourniquet"	Anberlin	3:13
8.	"Sunburn"	Owl City	3:48
9.	"You're So Cold"	Will Dailey	3:04
10.	"Love Seat"	The Red Jumpsuit Apparatus	3:05
11.	"One Small Step"	Parachute	3:29
12.	"Hearts Collide"	Sarah Solovay	3:05
13.	"Understand"	Darrelle London	2:20
14.	"City Girl"	Stars Crashing Cars	3:27
15.	"90210 Main Title (2009 Remix)"	John E. Davis	0:23
Total length:			44:33
