= Victoria Hogg =

English singer and songwriter (born 1983)

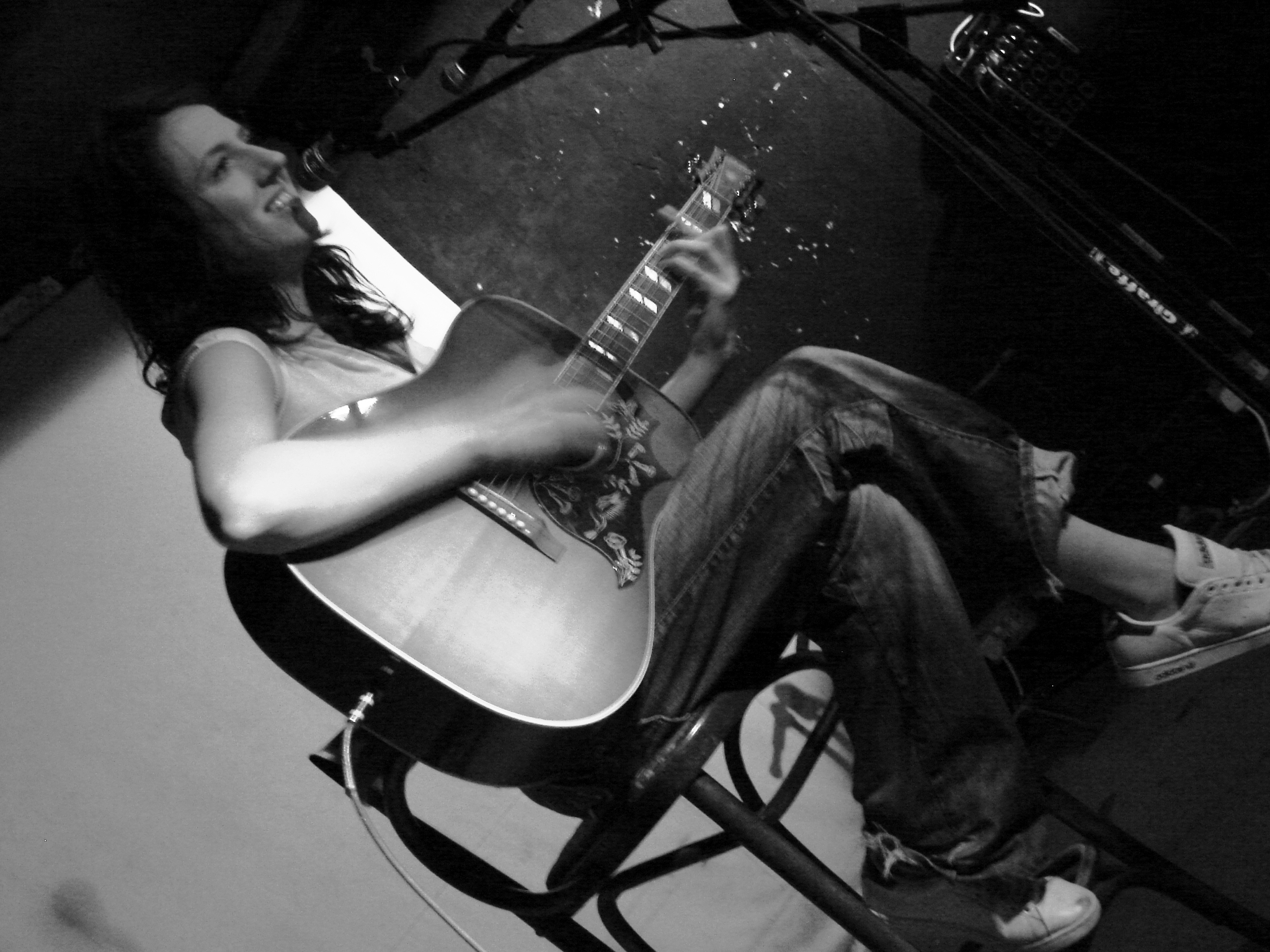
- Hogg performing live at The Grapes in 2007

Background information
- Born: 15 June 1983 (age 43); Darley Dale, Derbyshire, England
- Instruments: Vocals, guitar
- Years active: 1998–present
- Labels: Chrysalis Music, London
- Website: Victorialands

Victoria Hogg (born 15 June 1983) is an English singer and songwriter.

== Biography ==
Victoria Hogg was born in Darley Dale, Derbyshire, England.

She was discovered at the age of 15 after playing at a music seminar at Sheffield's Red Tape Studio. and was signed by Chrysalis Music and London Records. Her first performance upon signing with London Records was her joining the 1998 Lilith Fair at the Jones Beach venue in New York City. Kevin Bacon and Jonathan Quarmby (Bacon & Quarmby) produced much of her work as did Ian Stanley formally of Tears For Fears.

Singles were released but despite critical acclaim, they did not reach a significant chart position, but the song "Fall" received airplay on alternative UK radio stations and frequently on BBC Radio 2. The single was supported by a video which featured on The Box (UK TV channel).

Her work was generally positively received on release including The Times Comparisons were made with Billie Piper, but due to the lack of sales the recording contract was terminated.

Chrysalis Music did keep faith, and Hogg's later collaborations with James Dearlove produced a song titled "Voodoo Moon", which was included on the soundtrack for the 2006 film, Love and Other Disasters, which starred Brittany Murphy.

Hogg re-established her relationship with her former management and a band was formed "Victorialand" to showcase the new songs. An album called Chrysalis was produced for promotional purposes and had the following track list:

1. "Voodoo Moon"
2. "Crazy"
3. "Baby Don't Cry"
4. "Dayglo Skies"
5. "Waterfall"
6. "Fall"
7. "Innocent"
8. "Too Many People"
9. "Miss Understood"
10. "We'll Never Part"
11. "Loves Kiss"
12. "Cool Breeze"

== Discography ==
=== Singles ===
| Single | Month | Year | Country | Chart position |
|---|---|---|---|---|
| "Fall" | May | 1999 | UK | 70 |
| "Crazy" | August | 1999 | UK | |

=== Albums ===
| Album | Year | Country | Chart position |
|---|---|---|---|
| Chrysalis | 2003 | UK | |

- A blank box indicates it did not chart
