= Keren DeBerg =

American singer and lyricist

Keren DeBerg is an American singer and lyricist. Her music has featured in several TV shows, including Scrubs.

== Early career ==
DeBerg moved to New York City from Miami, Florida after graduating high school, and built a following in nightclubs. She sang with punk rock artist Jonathan Richman (There's Something About Mary) on his album I'm So Confused and performed at the third and final Lilith Fair in 1999.

Tracks from DeBerg's first record featured on The WB's Everwood and Jack & Bobby, MTV's Laguna Beach and The Hills, and NBC's Scrubs (in which she also appeared once, as a singing nurse). She started an Independent record label, 'Big Pea & A Dime Music', and wrote and featured in an article for Seventeen magazine which depicted the realities of being a woman in the male-dominated rock scene.

DeBerg's second album, the full-length Overwhelmed, was released on November 11, 2008.

DeBerg's song "Get Up & Go" was chosen by UEFA as the official song of the Under-21 Championship games that were held in Sweden in the summer of 2009. The song was played during every match leading up to finals, where she performed the song live at Eleda Stadion.
