= Stretch Princess =

- Stretch Princess as seen in the cover art of Free (1999)

Background information
- Origin: London, England
- Genres: Alternative rock, power pop
- Years active: 1996–2002
- Label: Wind-up
- Past members: Jo Lloyd; James Wright; Dave Magee

Stretch Princess was a British alternative rock band that formed in London, England in 1996. The band consisted of Jo Lloyd (vocals, bass, and piano), James Wright (guitar), and Dave Magee (drums). The band is mainly known for having its music featured in various films and television series, especially "Sorry", which was the lead track in the soundtrack of 1999 teen thriller Teaching Mrs. Tingle.

They released two studio albums, Stretch Princess (1998) and Fun with Humans (2002), and three singles.

== History ==
=== Background and formation ===
Jo Lloyd, born in Northern Ireland, had been attempting to make original compositions ever since her high school days, when she used to take piano classes. During her adolescence, she started meeting up with other musicians, further motivating her to pursue a career in music, which led to her not advancing into college after graduating. Instead, Lloyd performed at piano bars, playing casually alongside other musicians.

Dave Magee started learning music the age of 9. At first, he aspired to learn the saxophone, which he incorrectly believed to be an instrument played on the theme song of british animated series The Wombles. Around the same age, however, he was gifted a drum kit and start playing it. Magee reported a desire of attempting to play the drums as fast as possible allowed him to get into heavier music.

James Wright was born in Shoreham-by-Sea, West Sussex, but lived in Australia since the age of four. His father was a painter and had a studio at his home where he recorded local bands playing. The place was later used by Wright and his brother to write songs and host their own recording sessions. Wright performed in a few concerts in Perth before deciding to move to London.

At one point, a trio Lloyd was performing in disbanded due to the other two members moving on to playing professionally with different bands. It was around this time that she got to know Magee and share a demo tape with him. Having liked her recordings, the drummer agreed to help Lloyd find a guitarist and, in 1996, the two placed an advertisement in the music magazine Melody Maker, which caught the attention of Wright. Lloyd reported that the guitarist had been in England for only a few weeks when he contacted her and Magee and had answered thes advertisement "just for a laugh". Wright was accepted into the group, forming Stretch Princess.

The band was given its name in reference to the british car series Austin Princess, which had a model adapted into a limousine. According to Magee, the name is related to one owned by John Lennon of The Beatles.

=== Early years and Stretch Princess (1996–1998) ===
In 1996, Stretch Princess played in concerts throughout London, beginning with only around six original songs in their first performance. About this first concert, Wright stated: "We were so nervous and played so fast we had to play the whole set twice to fill up our time". The trio eventually traveled to Dublin, Ireland for the "In the City" music convention, which featured exclusively new bands. Lloyd reported that Stretch Princess got a lot of interest from british record labels but that she and the other members felt intimidated by the attention. Following the event, the trio would distance itself from the public to improve their playing and songwriting skills, composing many songs Lloyd considered "really good" with relative quickness.

In spite of the interests, the band wasn't generally well received in England due to the popularity of the britpop genre at the time. While Wright claimed that Lloyd's singing was "more honest" compared to the style adopted in britpop, Magee expressed that the trio had been discontent with the state of the british music scene for a long time, stating that Stretch Princess had "nothing in common with those so called new discoveries". The guitarist also claimed that the band always knew their music "would be better suited to American audiences".

The trio's opportunity to finally to perform in the United States arrived thanks to the College Music Journal festival, which allowed them to get the attention of several record labels. Among these was Wind Up Records, which Stretch Princess would sign up to in 1998 after sharing a demo tape. The contract motivated the band to move to New York, where the company was headquartered, making the city the group's home for their following years of activity. At Wind Up, Stretch Princess teamed up with producers Sean Slade and Paul Q. Kolderie, who had worked with bands such as Radiohead and Hole in the past, for their upcoming first release.

On August 25th of 1998, the band released their debut album, the homonymous Stretch Princess, with the song "Sorry" being released as a lead single. The record was positively received by critics, including Ira Robbins, editor of british rock and roll magazine Trouser Press, who placed it on his "Top 10 Albums for 1998" and described the trio as "energetic and confident". In 1999, "Sorry" peaked at #27 on Billboard's Adult Top 40 chart. The same year would see the release of "Free", another song first featured in Stretch Princess, as a single.

Following the release of Stretch Princess, the group toured frequently, being paired with bands such as Third Eye Blind and Better than Ezra.

During their early years, Stretch Princess also created other songs not featured in their debut album, such as "Stupid Boy".

=== Break from touring and Fun with Humans (1999–2002) ===
By March of 1999, the band already had a few songs either composed or planned after the release of Stretch Princess. Lloyd reported that she usually had written music on a piano, which kept the trio's music from having "cliched [sic]" guitar parts according to Wright, but had to switch her approach due to the impossibility of transporting the instrument in the group's van. Despite the limitation, the guitarist claimed that the band wanted to incorporate piano parts into songs for their next record.

Stretch Princess continued touring until Magee was diagnosed with an inoperable brain tumor, when its members decided to pause their travels and dedicate themselves to supporting each other. Alan Meltzer, founder of Wind Up Records, helped the trio during this period by paying the drummer's medical bills, which reportedly exceeded $100,000. During the break, the group continued to compose songs for their next album and Wright worked as a private investigator to supplement his income.

Magee eventually recovered from the tumor and, in August of 2002, the band would release their second album, Fun with Humans, produced with the aid of Luke Ebbin and Chris Johnson. The album's opening track "Freakshow" was released as a promotional single a few months prior and would reach #30 on the Billboard's Adult Top 40 chart on the same year.

== Songs in cinema and television ==
Songs from Stretch Princess saw somewhat frequent usage in cinema and television between the late 90s and early 2000s, with the earliest example being the 1999 TV series Felicity, which featured "Nice Thing". The album's second song and lead single "Sorry" is strongly associated with the 1999 film Teaching Mrs. Tingle, where it's used as the lead track in its soundtrack. In a live online chat with fans, James Wright commented on how Stretch Princess achieved "Sorry"'s feature in the film:

Actually, it's really down to a lot of hard work at the record company who forged good contacts with Miramax through Creed and things like that. Also, they've been big fans of the band and the record and we've been lucky enough to have had songs, as you know, in things like She's All That and Felicity.

Other uses of "Sorry" include the 15th episode of the first season of The West Wing and the film The Shrink Is In (2001). The latter featured "Oooh!" in its soundtrack as well, with the song also being used in the German TV show Mein Leben & Ich. Other songs from the band's debut record utilized in media include "Sugar", featured in She's All That (1999) and two Mary-Kate and Ashley Olsen films, Passport to Paris (1999) and Our Lips Are Sealed (2000), and "Universe", which was played in the first episode of the fourth season of Buffy the Vampire Slayer.

From Fun with Humans, "Time and Time Again" was featured in the first episode of the second season of Smallville.

== Band members ==
- Dave Magee - drums (1996–2002)
- James Wright - guitar (1996–2002)
- Jo Lloyd - vocals, bass, piano (1996–2002)

== Discography ==
=== Studio albums ===
- 1998: Stretch Princess
- 2002: Fun with Humans

=== Singles ===
- 1998: Sorry
- 1999: Free
- 2002: Freakshow

== See also ==
- List of power pop artists and songs
- Shelley Harland - musical career motivated by James Wright
