= Darrelle London =

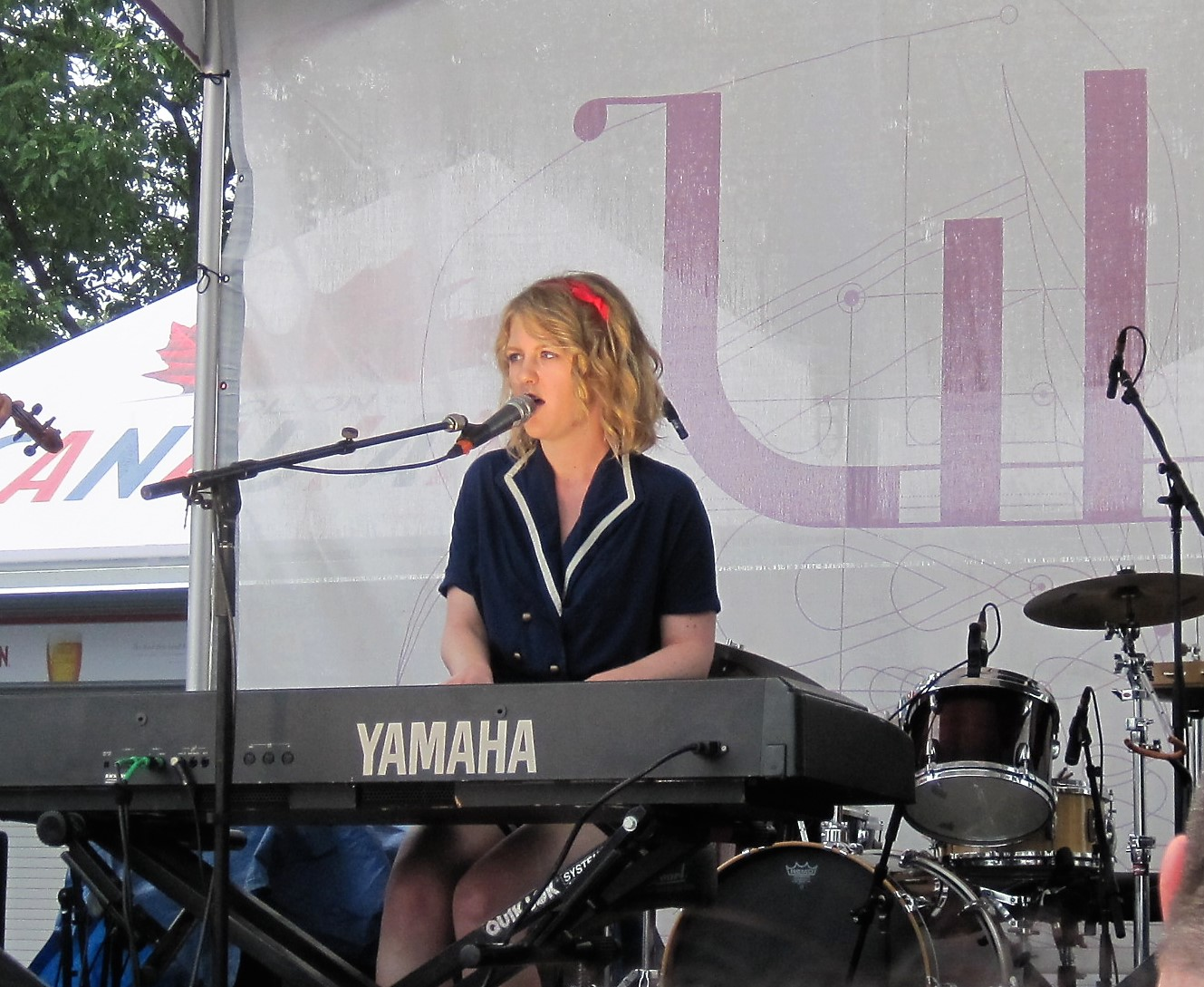
- Darrelle London performs at Lilith Fair on 24 July 2010

Background information
- Origin: Acton, Ontario, Canada
- Genres: Pop, piano pop
- Occupations: Musician, singer-songwriter
- Instruments: Piano, vocals
- Labels: Bandwidth, EMI
- Website: www.darrellelondon.com

Darrelle London is a piano pop singer-songwriter from Toronto, Canada known for her "clever quirkiness" and her "witty observations of everyday situations".

== Biography ==
Darrelle London began performing in cafes as a teen in her hometown of Acton, Ontario, outside Toronto. London turned down acceptance to law school in order to pursue her music career.

London released the My Piano EP in 2007 before releasing her debut album Edible World Parade independently in February 2009. Edible Word Parade was co-produced by Brian Allen (co-writer of Heart's "What About Love") and Marc Koecher. The song "Understand" was included on Soundtrack 90210, the first soundtrack album for 90210, released in October 2009 by CBS Records.

In 2010, London was approached by fellow Canadian singer-songwriter Chantal Kreviazuk and the two wrote three songs together – "Ceila", "Too Good" and "Peach" – which appeared on London's 2012 album Eat A Peach (Bandwidth/EMI). Kreviazuk also produced and sang backing vocals for "Ceila". The single "Fine" received national commercial airplay in Canada and peaked at Number 43 on Canada's Hot AC Mediabase chart.

London has performed at numerous festivals including Lilith Fair, North by Northeast, Canadian Music Week, and International Pop Overthrow. She has been featured on MuchMusic, ET Canada, MTVMusic.com, PerezHilton.com, CBC Music, and PBS.

London has also made PSAs and played benefits for mental health organization mindyourmind.

== Discography ==
- My Piano EP (2007)
- Edible Word Parade (2009)
- Eat A Peach (2012)
- Tangerine & Blue (2015)
- Sing to the Moon (2018)
- Primary (2023)

== Awards ==
- London was chosen as the Toronto Lilith Talent Search Winner by a judging committee including Lilith Fair founder Sarah McLachlan and performed at the 2010 Lilith Fair in Toronto.*London was chosen as a "Needle in the Haystack" artist by OurStage.
- London received a 2010 Toronto Independent Music Award for Best Pop.
- London was chosen as Bell Emerging Artist for May 2012.
- London was featured in a list of Extraordinary Women in The Huffington Post.
