= Choreography (Lauren Hoffman album) =

Studio album by Lauren Hoffman
- Released: 2006
- Genre: Experimental rock, Acoustic, Lo-fi
- Length: 41:52
- Label: Fargo Records

Lauren Hoffman chronology
From the Blue House (1999)	Choreography (2006)	Interplanetary Traveler (2009)

Choreography, released in 2006, is the third studio album by the American singer/songwriter Lauren Hoffman. For its production and recording, she worked with John Morand (who produced, mixed or played on Hoffman's releases throughout her career and ran Sound of Music Studios with Cracker's David Lowery), collaborator on 1997's Megiddo and 2010's Interplanetary Traveller. Consistent with her previous work, the album conveys an overall dark, moody atmosphere, as a result of its lyrical qualities, production, and variety of instruments, including prominent accordion, pump organ, cello, and piano parts throughout its tracks.

== Track listing ==
No.	Title	Length
1.	"Broken"	3:45
2.	"As The Stars"	4:47
3.	"White Sheets"	3:32
4.	"Ghost You Know"	4:08
5.	"Solipsist"	4:09
6.	"Another Song About the Darkness"	3:54
7.	"Hiding In Plain Sight"	3:41
8.	"Out of the Sky, Into the Sea"	3:15
9.	"Reasons To Fall"	3:11
10.	"Love Gone Wrong"	4:16
11.	"Joshua"	3:15
