= Lauren Hoffman =

American singer-songwriter (born 1977)

- Born: 1977 (age 47–48)
- Origin: Charlottesville, Virginia, U.S.
- Genres: Acoustic; Folk; Alternative rock Lo-fi; Pop; Indie
- Occupation: Singer-songwriter
- Instrument(s): Vocals, piano, synth, bass, tambourine, guitar
- Labels: Virgin Records; Fargo Records; Slow River Records; PIAS Recordings; Kill Rock Stars; Free Union Records; Dreamy Records; Pitch-a-Tent Records
- Website: www.laurenhoffman.com

Lauren Hoffman (born 1977) is an American singer-songwriter. She released her debut album Megiddo through Virgin Records in 1997 to critical praise. In 1999 Hoffman independently issued her second LP From The Blue House and an EP, A Harmless Little Kiss. Her third album Choreography was released through French record label Fargo Records in 2006 and includes her single "Broken".

She released her next album Interplanetary Traveler in 2010. Between 2015 and 2017, she performed and released music under a new moniker, The Secret Storm, during which she released two EPs and a fourth full-length album Family Ghost. Hoffman's 2019 EP Mercury Girls was positively reviewed by Rolling Stone as a "stunner."

== Biography ==
Hoffman was born in Los Angeles, in 1977. She moved to Charlottesville, Virginia at the age of 2, and started writing songs and playing guitar at 12 years old. She also played bass with Shannon Worrell and Kristin Asbury in a band called Monsoon, named after the Thai restaurant in which they played. She later left the band to focus on her career. She released her first full-length album Megiddo when she was 19. She parted ways with Virgin Records while taking full rights of the album – as it was poorly promoted, though it was largely recognized in Europe, especially France. Hoffman produced Megiddo with John Morand and Cracker's David Lowery; the album was mixed by Ethan Johns and recorded at the Sound of Music studio in Richmond. Hoffman and Jeff Buckley were friends for four years prior to his death – she called him a "mentor" and a "muse."

Hoffman produced her second album From The Blue House, released in Europe through PIAS in 1999. The album features "Song For A Boy," a tribute to her friend Jeff Buckley.

During 2003, Hoffman was in a band called The Lilas, based in Charlottesville. They worked up some of the songs that would appear on her next solo album.

Her third album, Choreography, was co-produced with John Morand - who has worked with Hoffman throughout her career, from early demos to Interplanetary Traveller, and as noted above Megiddo. Choreography was released in 2006 through French label Fargo Records. The album contains Hoffman's most successful single, "Broken".

Throughout her travel experiences she eventually recorded The Lucknow Demos, which partly inspirited her 2006 album Choreography. Her fourth album Interplanetary Traveler — which she recorded in Israel, was released in 2010. She released several of her EPs and albums in both Europe and America on 7" and 12" vinyl and CD. 2019 saw the release of her latest album Mercury Girls.

== Discography ==
=== Albums ===
- Megiddo (1997)
- From The Blue House (1999)
- Choreography (2006)
- Interplanetary Traveler (2010)
- Lauren Hoffman & The Secret Storm: Family Ghost (2017)
- Mercury Girls (2019)

=== Singles & EPs ===
- Fall Away (1996) 7" Vinyl
- The Chemist Said It Would Be Alright But I’ve Never Been The Same (1997)
- Rock Star (1997) 12" Vinyl
- Lolita (1997) 12" Vinyl
- A Harmless Little Kiss (1999)
- Song For A Boy (2000) 7" Vinyl
- Solipsist (2006) Single
- The Secret Storm: In The Sun (2015)
- The Secret Storm: The Dragon (2015)
- Lauren Hoffman & The Secret Storm: A Friend for the Apocalypse (2017) Single
- Shadow of the Moon (2018) Single
- Heartbreak and Tacos (2019) Single
- The Chemical (2019) Single
- The Chemical [Pandemic Remix] (2020) Single

=== Hallmark Releases ===
- The Lucknow Demos (2003) [Available to public 2018]
- Megiddo – 20th Anniversary All-Analog Vinyl Reissue (2018)

== Arts and filmography ==
After her album Megiddo was released in 1997, Hoffman spent some time traveling India, Europe and Israel to tour and forego her musical endeavour. She later studied the art of dance and choreography at Virginia Commonwealth University. In 2002 she decided to move forward from the study of dance to pursue her passion of music, while also incorporating her talent as a dancer. With her fellow peers, Hoffman went on to produce several musical and dance video productions for some of her songs, including Solipsist and Another Song About the Darkness — Choreography (2006).

The album cover for her EP The Chemist Said It Would Be Alright But I’ve Never Been The Same, was designed by outsider artist Wes Freed. Another Song About the Darkness, from her album Choreography, is included on The Sound the Hare Heard album.

Five of Hoffman's songs from Choreography were played throughout the groundbreaking LGBT series South of Nowhere: Ghost You Know, Magic Stick, Hope You Don't Mind, Reasons to Fall, and Broken. Her song Rock Star appears on the soundtrack of the 1998 motion picture, Palmetto.
