= Different Worlds (Jes Hudak song) =

2012 song by Jes Hudak and George Krikes

Single by Jes Hudak and George Krikes
- Released: April 3, 2012
- Length: 3:13
- Label: Selectracks
- Songwriters: George Krikes; Steven Stern

"Different Worlds" is a song recorded by American singer-songwriters Jes Hudak and George Krikes. Released as a production music song through the company Selectracks in October 2011, it went on to be featured in promotions for The Voice in Australia in 2012, and was released as a single, ultimately reaching number 21 on the ARIA Singles Chart.

== Background ==
Selectracks was an American production music company founded in 2000 by television and film music composer Steven Stern, and jazz recording artist Stuart Hart. The song "Different Worlds"—written by George Krikes and Steven Stern, and recorded by Jes Hudak with backing vocals by George Krikes—was released by Selectracks as part of their compilation Singer Songwriter Vol. 4, from their Selectracks Song Catalog series, on October 3, 2011. Earlier in 2011, Jes Hudak had placed second in the songwriting-themed reality television series Platinum Hit.

In March and April 2012, "Different Worlds" was used by the Nine Network to soundtrack promotions for the first Australian season of The Voice, which began airing on April 15, 2012. Interest in the song led it to be released as a commercial single on the iTunes Store on April 3, 2012, which Big Bang & Fuzz, the Australian distributor of Selectracks, noted was unusual for a production music song. It debuted at number 27 on the ARIA Singles Chart on the week of April 16, 2012, receding to number 30 the following week.

The following month, on May 21, 2012, "Different Worlds" was performed on The Voice by contestant Brittany Cairns. Following the show, Brittany Cairns' recording topped the Australian iTunes chart and the original version saw a surge in sales, leading to the former debuting at number 7 on the ARIA Singles Chart, and the latter re-entering at a new peak of number 21.

The song went on to be covered again on later Australian seasons of The Voice: in 2018 by Aja Elshaikh, and in 2020 by Claudia Harrison. It was also performed on The X Factor in 2013 by Jai Waetford.

== Charts ==
=== Jes Hudak and George Krikes version ===
==== Weekly charts ====
Chart (2012)	Peak position
Australia (ARIA)	21

=== Brittany Cairns version ===
==== Weekly charts ====
Chart (2012)	Peak position
Australia (ARIA)	7

==== Year-end charts ====
Chart (2012)	Position
Australian Artist Singles (ARIA)	47
