= Megiddo (Lauren Hoffman album) =

1997 studio album by Lauren Hoffman

Studio album by Lauren Hoffman
- Released: May 20, 1997
- Genre: Experimental rock, Acoustic, Lo-fi
- Length: 38:56
- Label: Virgin

Lauren Hoffman chronology
Megiddo (1997)	From The Blue House (1999)

Professional ratings
Review scores
Source	Rating
AllMusic	4/5 stars
San Francisco Chronicle	3/5 stars
Wall of Sound	72/100

Megiddo is the debut album by the American singer-songwriter Lauren Hoffman, released in 1997 through Virgin Records. The album was well received by critics, praised as "exceptional" by Billboard and "strikingly unconventional" by the Chicago Tribune. However, due to a lack of proper promotion by her record label and timing with releases by other artists, it went relatively unnoticed.

Single "Fall Away" and its b-side "Cold and Grey" were initially released in 1996 on a 7" vinyl through Slow River Records.

Overall, the album is known for its noticeably dark overtone, produced both by her songwriting and instrument choice, but is most prominent in the tracks "Blood", and "The Ashram Song". These qualities have since carried over to her later work.

The album was re-released on vinyl for its 20th anniversary in 2018.

== Track listing ==
No.	Title	Length
1.	"Blood"	3:21
2.	"Rock Star"	2:07
3.	"Lolita"	3:32
4.	"Fall Away"	4:09
5.	"Cold and Gray"	2:56
6.	"Hope You Don't Mind"	1:58
7.	"Strange Man"	3:13
8.	"Persephone"	3:34
9.	"Alive"	3:05
10.	"The Cannibal Ed"	1:47
11.	"Build a Home"	4:20
12.	"The Ashram Song"	4:54
