= Sozzi =

Sozzi is a surname. Notable people with the surname include:

- Francesco Sozzi (1732–1795), Italian painter, son of Olivio
- Giacomo Sozzi, late 19th century Italian sculptor
- Kim Sozzi (born 1978), American dance-pop singer
- Olivio Sozzi (1696–1765), Italian painter
