= The Silver Seas =

American pop-rock band

- Also known as: The Bees (U.S.)
- Origin: Nashville, Tennessee
- Genres: Pop rock
- Years active: 1999–present
- Label: The Lights Label/EMI (Europe)
- Website: Facebook

The Silver Seas, formerly the Bees, are a pop-rock band from Nashville, Tennessee.

== History ==
The Bees formed around the end of 2000 after singer-songwriter Daniel Tashian called producer-musician Jason Lehning. Tashian "had an instrumentation in his head and about 30-35 songs written for that sound," Lehning explained on his website. The two added Robbie Harrington (bass) and David Gehrke (drums) to the band's lineup within a few months and began playing shows and recording.

The Bees toured as an opening act for Guster in 2004 after the independent release of their debut album, Starry Gazey Pie. High Society followed in May 2006 (a non-album track titled "Silver Lining" played over the end credits of the Jeff Goldblum mockumentary Pittsburgh that same year).

On May 2, 2007, the Los Angeles-based label Cheap Lullaby announced that it had signed the Bees and intended to reissue High Society. Copyright issues involving the British band the Bees had already forced the Nashville group to add "U.S.," in parentheses, to the end of their name (even though the Bees of the UK are marketed as A Band of Bees stateside), so Cheap Lullaby encouraged Tashian and his bandmates to come up with a new moniker, hence the Silver Seas. The label reissued High Society under the band's new name on October 9, 2007.

Metromix gave the reissue of High Society a "Pick" rating and mentioned that the Silver Seas had a reputation as "one of the best unsigned bands in their hometown of Nashville," while Performing Songwriter magazine raved that the band had "made the catchiest album of the year." High Society was nominated at the seventh annual Independent Music Awards in 2008 for best pop-rock album of the year.

In July 2010, shortly after reissuing Starry Gazey Pie under their new name, the Silver Seas independently released their third album, Château Revenge! (in Europe, it was released by the Lights Label via EMI, which also distributed the band's subsequent two releases). It was followed six months later by a "blue edition" featuring acoustic versions of Château's 12 songs. BBC Radio presenter Danny Baker called the Silver Seas "the best group in the world" in 2011.

The band released their fourth LP, Alaska, produced by Joe Pisapia, in July 2013, describing it as their "country" album in an interview with BBC Radio 2, although its ten songs are by no means a departure from the lushly detailed arrangements of the Silver Seas' previous efforts. Having never been to Alaska himself, Daniel Tashian said that the name of the album reflects more of a state of mind than an actual geographical destination. The Guardian's Michael Hann gave Alaska a favorable review (four out of five stars), writing, "Daniel Tashian appears to be one of those songwriters from whom melodies simply pour, and there's barely a misplaced chord in this perfect miniature."

On May 14, 2015, Tashian announced on the Silver Seas' Facebook page that the band would be recording nine new songs in June. The lineup for those sessions, which took place in the same studio where the band recorded High Society ten years earlier, included Tashian on guitar, Lehning on piano and Juno-60 synthesizer, David Gehrke on drums, Lex Price on bass, and Jonathan Trebing on nylon string guitar, with Konrad Snyder engineering. In December, the Silver Seas released three songs from their upcoming fifth album, tentatively titled X, on iTunes: "Caitlin," "Melody," and "Run to You."

The fifth album, officially titled Moonlight Road, was made available as a SoundCloud stream on December 24, 2017, but was removed from that website soon after. Moonlight Road was officially released one week later, on New Year's Day, on various digital platforms, including iTunes and Spotify, and featured 11 new songs; "Caitlin," "Melody," and "Run to You" were not included.

Tashian has recorded several albums under his own name, including Sweetie (1996), Arthur (2011), and, although it's never been officially released, "The Lovetest," which he offered as a free download in 2005 on his now-defunct blog. His 2010 EP The Lights of Town is (like Arthur) available on iTunes, as is the self-titled 2014 EP by Skyline Motel, a Nashville quartet consisting of Tashian, Sarah Buxton, Ian Fitchuk, and Kate York. Tashian makes his living as a country songwriter for a music publisher in Nashville.

Lehning's side projects include coproducing David Mead's 1999 debut album, The Luxury of Time. He also played on Mead's next three releases, and Mead recorded "From My Window Sill," written by Tashian, for his 2008 album, Almost and Always, almost two years before the Silver Seas' version appeared on Château Revenge! Tashian, meanwhile, cowrote three songs with Josh Rouse for the latter's 2005 album, Nashville, as well as the opening track of Subtítulo, Rouse's 2006 follow-up. The singer-songwriter returned the favor by cowriting "Roxy," a track on Alaska, with Tashian.

== Band members ==
Current

- David Gehrke: drums, backing vocals
- Jason Lehning: piano, backing vocals
- Daniel Tashian: lead vocals, guitar

Former/recurring

- John Deaderick: bass, backing vocals on High Society; piano and synthesizer on Château Revenge!
- Robbie Harrington: bass on Starry Gazey Pie
- Lex Price: bass on Château Revenge! and Moonlight Road

== Discography ==
- Starry Gazey Pie (2004)
- High Society (2006)
- Château Revenge! (2010)
- Alaska (2013)
- Moonlight Road (2018)
