= Almost and Always =

Studio album by David Mead
- Released: October 22, 2008 [Japan]; August 25, 2009 [US]
- Recorded: May 1–7, 2008
- Studio: Alex the Great Recording (Nashville, Tennessee)
- Genre: Pop-rock
- Length: 43:30
- Label: Cheap Lullaby Records
- Producer: Brad Jones

David Mead chronology
Tangerine (2006)	Almost and Always (2008)	Dudes (2011)

Almost and Always is the fifth full-length album by singer-songwriter David Mead. "The elegant, torchy tunes were originally intended for a Bette Midler-style female vocalist, until Mead decided to cut them himself", wrote Steve Leftridge of PopMatters in November 2009, adding that Almost and Always "may be 2009's loveliest collection of pop songs". "Last Train Home" was NPR's Song of the Day on January 9, 2009, several months after Almost and Always was first released on CD in Japan and online at NoiseTrade.

Many of the album's songs saw their live debut at the Basement in Nashville, Tennessee, on July 30, 2008. "From My Window Sill", written by Daniel Tashian, was later recorded by his band, the Silver Seas, for their 2010 album Château Revenge!

== Track listing ==
All tracks written by David Mead and Bill DeMain, except where noted.

1. "Rainy Weather Friend" – 3:41
2. "Little Boats" – 2:49
3. "Blackberry Winters" (Mead) – 3:40
4. "Mojave Phone Booth" – 3:42
5. "Twenty Girls Ago" – 4:27
6. "From My Window Sill" (Daniel Tashian) – 2:46
7. "Sicily" – 3:05
8. "Gramercy Vaudeville" (Mead) – 3:09
9. "Last Train Home" – 3:53
10. "Almost and Always" – 2:47
11. "Love Don't Leave Me Now" – 1:50
12. "Sleeping In Saturday" – 3:59
13. "Home" (Mead) – 3:41

== Personnel ==
- Chris Carmichael – cello, violas, violins
- Bill DeMain – guitars
- Jim Hoke – clarinets, flutes
- Brad Jones – harmonium, mandolin, upright bass, vibraphone, whistling
- David Mead – guitar, percussion, ukulele, vocals
- Tyson Rogers – keyboards, piano, vibraphone

Production

- Recorded and mixed by Brad Jones (Renauldo Grant, assistant) and mastered by Jim DeMain. Photography by Heidi Ross and design by Hotel Romeo.
