= Wherever You Are (David Mead album) =

EP by David Mead
- Released: June 28, 2005
- Recorded: 2002
- Studio: Bearsville Studios and the Barn (Woodstock, New York); Real World Studios (Bath, England)
- Genre: Pop-rock
- Length: 22:37
- Label: Eleven Thirty Records
- Producer: Stephen Hague

David Mead chronology
Indiana (2004)	Wherever You Are (2005)	Tangerine (2006)

Professional ratings
Review scores
Source	Rating
AllMusic	4/5 stars

Wherever You Are is an EP by singer-songwriter David Mead, released on Eleven Thirty Records in 2005. "David Mead managed to survive record company legalese and emerge to release the finest tracks from his 2002 recording sessions with Stephen Hague (New Order, Blur, Pet Shop Boys)," John D. Luerssen wrote in a review for AllMusic. "EPs are rarely this accomplished or appealing."

"I recorded the full version with the band in late 2002," Mead told Nashville Rage in 2005. "Right when I turned it in to the record company [RCA, to which he was signed at the time], they merged with another company" — BMG combined RCA Records and J Records to form the RCA Music Group in 2003 — "so some artists were dropped. They were actually really very gracious, and gave us most of the rights to the record back. But the thing was, by the time all that legal mumbo jumbo had gone down, I was on to something different and my head was in a much different space. I had started this other record with David Henry because I didn't really know whether or not I was going to get Wherever You Are back, and [Indiana] seemed like a more timely thing to put out."

== Track listing ==
All tracks written by David Mead except where noted.

1. "Wherever You Are" (Mead, Jason Lehning) – 3:37
2. "Hold On" – 4:08
3. "Only a Dream" (Mead, Daniel Tashian) – 4:54
4. "Astronaut" – 3:23
5. "Make It Right" – 3:36
6. "How Much" – 2:59

== Session outtakes ==
- "All Is Forgiven"
- "Attitude"
- "Beauty" (rerecorded for Indiana)
- "Growin' Up"
- "How Will the Kids Get High" (rerecorded for Indiana but shelved)
- "Little Sister"
- "NYC Girl"
- "Oneplusone" (rerecorded for Indiana)
- "Patience"
- "Subway"
- "Wherever"

== Personnel ==
- Ethan Eubanks – drums, percussion, background vocals
- Stephen Hague – accordion
- Jeff Hill – cello
- Whynot Jansveld – bass, baritone guitar, background vocals
- David Mead – vocals, guitars, keyboards, piano
- Chuck Norman – programming, additional keyboards

== Production notes ==
Recorded by Graeme Stewart, mixed by Bob Kraushaar (tracks 1, 4, and 6) and Tchad Blake (tracks 2, 3, and 5), and mastered by Mike Marsh. Artwork by Natalie Cox Mead and Håkon Øynes.
