= Under Cold Blue Stars =

Studio album by Josh Rouse
- Released: 2002
- Genre: folk music/indie rock
- Label: Slow River Records

Josh Rouse chronology
Bedroom Classics, Vol. 1 (2001)	Under Cold Blue Stars (2002)	1972 (2003)

Professional ratings
Aggregate scores
Source	Rating
Metacritic	80/100 link
Review scores
Source	Rating
Pitchfork Media	6.4/10 link
Rolling Stone	favorable link

Under Cold Blue Stars is the third album by indie folk musician Josh Rouse. It was released in 2002 and was his last album for Slow River Records.

== Track listing ==
1. "Twilight" (Josh Rouse) — 0:28
2. "Nothing Gives Me Pleasure" (Rouse) — 3:16
3. "Miracle" (Rouse) — 3:58
4. "Christmas With Jesus" (Rouse) — 4:14
5. "Under Cold Blue Stars" (Rouse, Pat Sansone) — 4:26
6. "Ugly Stories" (Rouse) — 5:26
7. "Feeling No Pain" (Curt Perkins, Rouse) — 4:19
8. "Ears to the Ground" (Jason M. Phelan) — 2:51
9. "Summer Kitchen Ballad" (Rouse) — 2:59
10. "Women and Men" (Rouse) — 5:06
11. "The Whole Night Through" (Rouse) — 2:34

== Personnel ==
- Josh Rouse - guitars, vocals
- Pat Sansone - bass, keyboards, vibes, guitars, percussion
- Dennis Cronin - trumpet
- David Henry - cello
- Roger Moutenot - guitars, keyboards
- Curt Perkins - loops
- Darren Jessee - drums on 2, 3, 5, 6, 10
- David Gerhke - drums on 4, 11
- Marc Pisapia - drums on 7
- Tony Miracle, Kip Kubin - programming on 5, 8
- Mike Grimes - bass on 4, 11
