= Alaska (The Silver Seas album) =

Studio album by The Silver Seas
- Released: July 8, 2013 (Europe); July 9, 2013 (North America)
- Recorded: December 3–7, 2012
- Studio: Middletree Studios (Nashville, Tennessee)
- Genre: pop-rock
- Length: 37:22
- Label: self-released (North America); The Lights Label/EMI (Europe)
- Producer: Joe Pisapia

The Silver Seas chronology
Château Revenge! (2010)	Alaska (2013)	Moonlight Road (2018)

Alaska, the fourth album by the Silver Seas, was released in the summer of 2013. Frontman Daniel Tashian described it as the band's "country" record, explaining in a press release that they "tried to play well, crisply, economically, like country musicians. There is plenty of [producer Joe Pisapia's] steel guitar. The songs are about distance. Distance between places, weather, people, ideas. It's about somewhere you would never stumble on; you have to deliberately go to Alaska. I've never been there, I don't know if I will ever go, but I have a beautiful idea of what it's like." He added, "They say it takes an outsider to describe a place accurately; Joe's from New Jersey and I was born in Connecticut. Sometimes I see my friends go from relationship to relationship, looking for this place they see in their minds, but reality always falls short somehow ... Sometimes it's best to leave certain things to the imagination."

== Track listing ==
All songs written by Daniel Tashian, except where noted.

1. "Alaska" – 3:05
2. "I'm the One" – 3:34
3. "Lights Out" – 4:21
4. "As the Crow Flies" – 4:11
5. "Roxy" (Tashian, Josh Rouse) – 4:17
6. "Sea of Regret" – 4:03
7. "A Night on the Town" – 3:30
8. "Karaoke Star" (Tashian, Angelo Petraglia) – 3:09
9. "Wolfie" – 3:27
10. "Wild Honey" – 3:50

== Personnel ==
- David Gehrke: drums, percussion
- Jason Lehning: piano, Wurlitzer, organ, vibraphone, iPhone
- Joe Pisapia: bass, electric guitar, acoustic guitar, pedal steel guitar, banjo, keyboards, vocals
- Daniel Tashian: lead vocals, acoustic guitar, baritone guitar, mandolin, piano, Prophet '08 synthesizer, vibraphone, iPad, Logic Pro strings
- Jonathan Trebing: electric guitar on "I'm the One," "Roxy," and "A Night on the Town"

== Production notes ==
Engineered by Greg Goodman and Joe Pisapia, mixed by Pisapia, and mastered by Jim DeMain at Yes Master Studios. Artwork and design by Sam Smith.
