= Home (Josh Rouse album) =

Studio album by Josh Rouse
- Released: March 14, 2000 [US]
- Genre: Folk music, Indie rock
- Label: Slow River Records

Josh Rouse chronology
Chester EP (1999)	Home (2000)	Bedroom Classics, Vol.1 (2001)

Professional ratings
Review scores
Source	Rating
Allmusic	4/5 stars
The Austin Chronicle	3.5/5 stars
Entertainment Weekly	B

Home is the second full-length studio album by the indie folk musician Josh Rouse. The album was released in March 2000 by Slow River Records and included the single "Directions", which was also featured on the soundtrack to the Cameron Crowe movie "Vanilla Sky" entitled "Music from Vanilla Sky".

== Track listing ==
1. "Laughter" — 4:43
2. "Marvin Gaye" — 3:10
3. "Directions" — 3:26
4. "Parts and Accessories" — 3:55
5. "100m Backstroke" — 3:32
6. "Hey Porcupine" — 3:51
7. "In Between" — 4:05
8. "And Around" — 4:18
9. "Afraid to Fail" — 3:27
10. "Little Know It All" — 3:46
