= Indiana (David Mead album) =

Studio album by David Mead
- Released: May 4, 2004 [US]; June 7, 2004 [UK]; June 21, 2004 [Japan]
- Studio: True Tone Studios (Nashville, Tennessee)
- Genre: Pop-rock
- Length: 41:06
- Label: Nettwerk America
- Producer: David Henry, David Mead

David Mead chronology
Mine and Yours (2001)	Indiana (2004)	Wherever You Are (2005)

Professional ratings
Review scores
Source	Rating
AllMusic	4/5 stars

Indiana is the third album by singer-songwriter David Mead, released in 2004 on Nettwerk America. "While the material here can have the feel of adult contemporary singer/songwriter fare, the depth of Mead's writing, both lyrically and melodically, steers it clear of any of the banalities that can creep into the genre," wrote Brett Hartenbach in a review for AllMusic. "Indiana may lack the immediate hookiness that made The Luxury of Time and Mine and Yours so irresistible, but it's every bit as strong and should prove to be just as enduring." PopMatters's review of the album declared, "David Mead proves he’s only getting better — and while those looking to be rocked might be put off by this relatively mid-tempo collection, there’s no denying the quality of each of these special songs. His voice covers a wide range to falsetto and back again; his songs exude emotion, honesty and wit."

== Track listing ==
All tracks written by David Mead except where noted.

1. "Nashville" – 3:56
2. "You Might See Him" – 4:04
3. "Indiana" – 3:47
4. "Beauty" – 3:34
5. "Only a Girl" – 3:16
6. "Oneplusone" – 3:52
7. "Bucket of Girls" – 3:15
8. "New Mexico" – 3:19
9. "Ordinary Life" – 3:38
10. "Human Nature" (John Bettis, Steve Porcaro) – 3:39
11. "Queensboro Bridge" – 4:45
12. "Chutes and Ladders" (bonus track, Japan)

== Session outtakes ==
- "How Will the Kids Get High" (version 2)
- "Lease on Life"

== Personnel ==
- Butterfly Boucher – background vocals ("Oneplusone" and "Human Nature")
- Chris Carmichael – arrangement and string quartet ("Queensboro Bridge")
- Ethan Eubanks – drums ("Oneplusone")
- Shannon Forrest – drums ("Beauty")
- David Henry – cello, lead euphonium, trumpet, trombone
- Brad Jones – upright bass
- David Mead – vocals, guitar, piano, lap steel guitar
- Joe Pisapia – lap steel guitar
- Marc Pisapia – drums and percussion, background vocals

== Production notes ==
Recorded and mixed by David Henry and mastered by Jim DeMain. ("Beauty" was produced by Henry, David Mead, and Jason Lehning and mixed by Lehning; engineered by Casey Wood and Bart Morris, with assistance from Zach Dychs; and recorded at the Compound and Wolf Music, in Nashville.) Cover painting by Natalie Cox Mead, photography by John Painter, and layout by Kim Kinakin and Ralph Alfonso.
