= Chester (album) =

1999 EP by American musicians Josh Rouse and Kurt Wagner

EP by Josh Rouse, Kurt Wagner
- Released: September 14, 1999 [US]
- Genre: Folk music, Indie rock
- Label: Slow River

Josh Rouse, Kurt Wagner chronology
Dressed Up Like Nebraska (1998)	Chester (1999)	Home (2000)

Professional ratings
Review scores
Source	Rating
Allmusic	link

Chester is an EP by the indie folk musician Josh Rouse and Lambchop member Kurt Wagner. It was recorded and engineered by David Henry at True Tone Studios in Nashville, Tennessee and released in September 1999 by Slow River Records. Wagner wrote song lyrics for the album while Rouse composed the music.

== Track listing ==
No.	Title	Length
1.	"Somehow You Could Always Tell"	2:55
2.	"That's What I Know"	3:31
3.	"Table Dance"	6:10
4.	"65"	3:28
5.	"I Couldn't Wait"	4:05

== Personnel ==
- Josh Rouse - vocals, guitar, melodica, composer
- Kurt Wagner - vibes, additional ambient noise, artwork, composer, vibraphone
- Sharon Gilchrist - upright bass
- Malcolm Travis - drums
- David Henry - cello, background vocals, sound engineer
- Dennis Cronin - trumpet
- Curt Perkins - Rhodes piano
