= Starry Gazey Pie =

Studio album by The Silver Seas
- Released: April 20, 2004
- Genre: pop-rock
- Length: 34:20
- Label: self-released
- Producer: Jason Lehning

The Silver Seas chronology
| Starry Gazey Pie (2004) | High Society (2006) |

Starry Gazey Pie is the 2004 debut album from the Silver Seas. Its original cover reflected the band's previous name, the Bees (U.S.), but unlike their second album, High Society (2006), Starry Gazey Pie wasn't reissued on Cheap Lullaby Records in 2007. However, on iTunes and Amazon.com the band's current name replaces the previous one on the MP3 version of the album.

== Track listing ==
All songs written by Daniel Tashian.

1. "Destiny on the Lawn" – 2:31
2. "Starry Gazey Pie" – 4:00
3. "Love Is a Holiday" – 2:22
4. "Message From the Birds" – 2:15
5. "Sea of Stars" – 5:33
6. "It's Only Gravity" – 2:56
7. "Letters From the Dead" – 3:22
8. "Bring On the Clowns" – 3:47
9. "Mrs. Wilson" – 4:32
10. "It Was" – 2:58

== Personnel ==
- David Gehrke: drums, vocals
- Robbie Harrington: upright bass
- Jason Lehning: piano, Juno-60, vocals
- Daniel Tashian: lead vocals, 12-string guitar

== Production notes ==
Engineered by King Williams. Mastered by Jim DeMain at Yes Master Studios in Nashville, Tenn. Sleeve design by Carl Tashian.
