= High Society (The Silver Seas album) =

Studio album by The Silver Seas
- Released: May 2, 2006; October 9, 2007 (reissue)
- Studio: Sound Emporium (Nashville, Tennessee)
- Genre: pop-rock
- Length: 32:08; with bonus tracks, 39:45
- Label: self-released; Cheap Lullaby (reissue)
- Producer: Jason Lehning

The Silver Seas chronology
Starry Gazey Pie (2004)	High Society (2006)	Château Revenge! (2010)

High Society is the second album by Nashville pop rock band the Silver Seas. The album was originally self-released in May 2006 under the band's previous name, the Bees, then rereleased in October 2007 by Cheap Lullaby under their current name. The song "Catch Yer Own Train" was featured in a first-season episode of AMC's Breaking Bad and is included on the soundtrack album Breaking Bad: Music From the Original Television Series (2010).

== Track listing ==
All songs written by Daniel Tashian, except where noted.

1. "The Country Life" – 2:39
2. "High Society" – 2:44
3. "Ms. November" – 2:10
4. "Imaginary Girl" – 2:28
5. "She Is Gone" – 3:14
6. "Catch Yer Own Train" – 3:06
7. "Tativille" – 2:38
8. "We'll Go Walking" (Tashian, Jason Lehning) – 3:39
9. "Hard Luck Tom" – 1:51
10. "Dream of Love" – 3:37
11. "The Broadway Lights" (Tashian, Lehning) – 3:52
12. "Infinite Number of Monkeys" – 3:42 [2007 Bonus Track]
13. "I Want to Live" – 3:55 [2007 Bonus Track]

== Personnel ==
- John Deaderick: bass, vocals
- David Gehrke: drums, vocals
- Jason Lehning: piano, Juno-60, vocals
- Daniel Tashian: lead vocals, 12- and 6-string guitars, ukulele

== Production notes ==
Recorded at Sound Emporium in Nashville, Tennessee, by Zachary Dycus and Bart Morris, May 11–12, 2005; additional recording by Patrick Granado, Jason Lehning, and Daniel Tashian. Mixed by Lehning at the Compound. Mastered by Jim DeMain at Yes Master Studios. Sleeve design by Carl Tashian; watercolors by Mary Sperling.
