= 1972 (disambiguation) =

1972 was a leap year starting on Saturday of the Gregorian calendar.

1972 may also refer to:

- 1972 (album), a 2003 album by Josh Rouse, and the title song
- 1972 (EP), a 2022 EP by The Black Crowes
- "1972", a 2013 song by Jake Owen from Days of Gold
