= Orange Bowl (disambiguation) =

The Orange Bowl is an annual college football bowl game.

Orange Bowl may also refer to:

- Miami Orange Bowl, a demolished stadium formerly located in Miami, Florida
- Orange Bowl (tennis), an ITF Grade A, USTA Level 1 junior tennis tournament, held in Key Biscayne, Florida
- Orange Bowl Basketball Classic, an annual men's college basketball event played in Florida
- Junior Orange Bowl, a Florida-based non-profit organization
- Junior Orange Bowl (tennis), a youth tennis tournament held in Coral Gables, Florida

== See also ==
- Citrus Bowl
- Tangerine Bowl
