= Tangelo (disambiguation) =

A tangelo is a type of citrus fruit.

Tangelo may also refer to:

- Tangelo (color), a shade of orange
- Tangelo Park, a census-designated place in Florida

== See also ==
- Tangerine (disambiguation)
