= The Luxury of Time =

Studio album by David Mead
- Released: September 28, 1999 [US]; June 26, 2000 [UK]
- Genre: Pop-rock
- Length: 51:49
- Label: RCA Records
- Producer: Peter Collins (Jason Lehning, associate producer)

David Mead chronology
The Luxury of Time (1999)	Mine and Yours (2001)

Professional ratings
Review scores
Source	Rating
AllMusic	4/5 stars

The Luxury of Time is the debut album by singer-songwriter David Mead, released by RCA Records in 1999. "Mead writes slick, sophisticated, and at its best, timeless sounding pop songs that seem to be rooted as much in the tradition of Gershwin and Porter as they are in the music of Lennon and McCartney or Elvis Costello," wrote Brett Hartenbach for AllMusic. "Though sporting a somewhat glossier sound, The Luxury of Time fits nicely alongside the works of such artists as Freedy Johnston and Ron Sexsmith as the touchstone for the '90s new crop of young writers."

== Track listing ==
All tracks written by David Mead.

1. "Robert Bradley's Postcard" – 4:23
2. "Sweet Sunshine" – 4:20
3. "Touch of Mascara" – 3:37
4. "Apart From You" – 3:13
5. "Breathe You In" – 4:20
6. "World of a King" – 3:48
7. "Landlocked" – 4:47
8. "Telephone" – 3:56
9. "Everyone Knows It But You" – 4:00
10. "She, Luisa" – 3:34
11. "Make the Most Of" – 4:16
12. "While the World Is Sleeping" – 4:06
13. "Painless" – 3:30

== Session outtakes ==
- "Bucket of Girls" (rerecorded for Indiana)
- "Claws"
- "Jonathan Barnum, Talk of the Town"

== Personnel ==
- Rusty Anderson – guitars (12-string, acoustic, electric), bouzouki, screams
- Kenny Aronoff, Paul Deakin, Marc Pisapia – drums
- Richard Foust – trombone
- Paul David Hager – tambourine
- Michael Hanna – string arrangements
- Havana Horns – horns
- David Henry – cello
- Carl Herrgesell – mellotron, Wurlitzer organ
- Jim Horn – saxophone
- Scotty Huff, Matt Nygren – trumpet
- Viktor Krauss – upright bass
- Peter Langella, Craig Young – bass
- Mike Lawler – Hammond organ
- Jason Lehning – Hammond organ, Vox Continental organ, Wurlitzer organ, Omnichord, harmonium, lap steel guitar
- Tom McGinley – baritone saxophone
- Chris McHugh – drums, percussion
- David Mead – vocals, acoustic and electric guitars, piano, thumb piano, keyboards, percussion
- Joe Pisapia – guitar
- Anthony J. Resta – percussion, synthesizer programming
- Kayton Roberts – lap steel guitar
- Paul Zonn – clarinet

== Production notes ==
Recorded by Roger Moutenot, Jason Lehning, and Paul David Hager; mixed by Hager and Mike Shipley; and mastered by Ted Jensen. Photography by Tony Duran and art direction by Sean Mosher-Smith.
