= Tangerine (disambiguation) =

Tangerine is a group of orange-colored citrus fruit.

Tangerine may also refer to:

== Arts and entertainment ==
=== Music ===
- Tangerine (band)
- Tangerine (Dexter Gordon album) (1972)
- Tangerine (Vixen album) (1998)
- Tangerine (David Mead album) (2006)
- "Tangerine" (1941 song), written by Johnny Mercer and Victor Schertzinger
- "Tangerine" (Led Zeppelin song) (1970)
- "Tangerine" (Feeder song) (1997)
- "Tangerine", a song by Life of Agony from the album Soul Searching Sun (1997)
- "Tangerine", a song by Prince from the album Rave Un2 the Joy Fantastic (1999)
- "Tangerine", a song by Big Boi from the album Sir Lucious Left Foot: The Son of Chico Dusty (2010)
- "Tangerine", a song by Miley Cyrus from the album Miley Cyrus & Her Dead Petz (2015)
- "Tangerine", a song by Glass Animals from the album Dreamland (2020)
- "Tangerine", a song by Kehlani from the album Blue Water Road (2022)

=== Films, television and musicals ===
- Tangerines (film), Estonian-Georgian film (2013)
- Tangerine (film), American film (2015)
- Tangerine (musical), Broadway musical (1921)
- "Chapter Sixty-Six: Tangerine", a 2019 episode of the television series Riverdale

=== Literature ===
- Tangerine (Bloor novel), a 1997 novel by Edward Bloor
- Tangerine (Mangan novel), a 2018 novel by Christine Mangan
- Tangerine (comics), character in Marvel Comics

== Businesses ==
- Tangerine Bank, Canadian bank, formerly known as ING Direct
- Tangerine Computer Systems, early computer manufacturer
- Tangerine Confectionery, British confectionery company
- Tangerine Records (1962), a record label owned by Ray Charles between 1962 and 1973
- Tangerine Records (1992), a UK-based independent record label founded in 1992 by Paul Bevoir, Chris Hunt and John Ashworth

== Other uses ==
- Tangerine, Florida, a census-designated place in Orange County, Florida, U.S.
- Tangerine (cable system), a submarine telecommunications cable system
- Tangerine (color), an orange-color hue used to give the impression of the tangerine fruit
- Tangerine Bowl, a named shared by two different college football bowl games and a stadium the game was played in

== See also ==
- Tangerine Dream, German electronic-music group (1967–present)
- Tangier, a city in northwestern Morocco
