= Mine and Yours =

Studio album by David Mead
- Released: May 15, 2001 [US]; July 25, 2001 [Japan]; April 20, 2002 [UK]
- Studio: Sear Sound and TMF Studios (New York City)
- Genre: Pop-rock
- Length: 50:21
- Label: RCA Records
- Producer: Adam Schlesinger

David Mead chronology
The Luxury of Time (1999)	Mine and Yours (2001)	Indiana (2004)

Professional ratings
Review scores
Source	Rating
AllMusic	4/5 stars

Mine and Yours is the second album by singer-songwriter David Mead, released by RCA Records in 2001. "Mead is the consummate songwriter, much in the tradition of John Lennon and Paul McCartney or Paul Simon, creating timeless, memorable melodies that are fresh and inventive, while still ringing with a certain, inviting familiarity," wrote Brett Hartenbach in a review for AllMusic.

== Track listing ==
All tracks written by David Mead.

1. "Flamin' Angel" – 4:22
2. "Mine and Yours" – 4:26
3. "Comfort" – 3:30
4. "Echoes of a Heart" – 4:26
5. "Standing Here in Front of Me" – 3:24
6. "No One Left to Blame" – 4:14
7. "Girl on the Roof" – 3:20
8. "Elodie" – 2:50
9. "What's on Your Mind" – 3:01
10. "What I Want to Do" – 4:16
11. "Venus Again" – 4:22
12. "Figure of Eight" – 4:36
13. "Only in the Movies" – 3:35
14. "Slow Night" (bonus track, Japan)
15. "Didn't I Warn You" (bonus track, Japan)

== Personnel ==
- Dominique Durand – background vocals ("Mine and Yours" and "Elodie")
- John Holbrook – Moog synthesizer ("Venus Again")
- Jason Lehning – organ ("Elodie"), Wurlitzer organ and drum fills ("Venus Again")
- David Mead – vocals, acoustic and electric guitars, keyboards, piano, bass ("Flamin' Angel")
- Shawn Pelton – drums, percussion, programming
- Jody Porter – electric guitar ("Venus Again")
- Adam Schlesinger – keyboards, piano, percussion, programming, electric guitar, bass ("What I Want to Do")
- Jon Skibic – electric guitars
- Danny Weinkauf – bass

== Production notes ==
Recorded by John Holbrook (Tom Dekorte and Aaron Franz, assistants) and mixed by Holbrook (tracks 1, 3, and 8–13) and Bob Clearmountain (tracks 2 and 4–7) (David Boucher, Richard Furch, and Darren Rapp, assistants). Photography by Stephanie Pfriender and David Mead and art direction by Frank Harkins.
