= David Mead (musician) =

American singer-songwriter (born 1973)

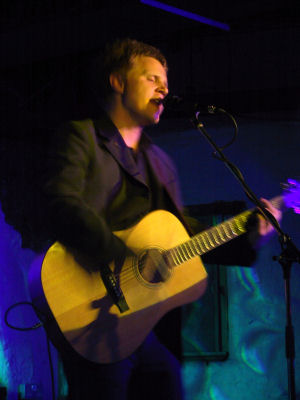
- Mead in 2003

Background information
- Born: David Worth Mead; September 3, 1973 (age 52); Syosset, New York
- Genres: Pop
- Occupation: Singer-songwriter
- Website: www.davidmead.com

David Worth Mead (born September 3, 1973) is a Nashville-based pop singer-songwriter. Over the years, he has toured extensively, headlining as well as opening shows for John Mayer, Fountains of Wayne, Ron Sexsmith, Liz Phair, Joe Jackson, and Shelby Lynne.

== Early life ==
David Worth Mead was born on September 3, 1973 in Syosset, New York, to a traveling salesman father and a schoolteacher mother. Mead's family moved often during his childhood, mostly around the southern United States, before settling in Nashville, Tennessee, in 1986. As a child, he sang in a church choir and in school productions like The Sound of Music. When he was 13, he got his first guitar and was soon writing his own songs; three years later, he was gigging professionally. In Nashville, he played in bands such as Verdant Green, Blue Million, and Joe, Marc's Brother.

== Career ==
=== The Luxury of Time ===
Mead moved to New York City in 1997 and signed a major-label deal with RCA Records the following year. The initial sessions for his debut – three songs recorded with Gus Dudgeon (Elton John, XTC) – were deemed unsuccessful and were scrapped. Mead then regrouped with producers Peter Collins (the Cardigans, Rush) and Jason Lehning (Emerson Hart, Alison Krauss), and between late 1998 and early 1999, they cut The Luxury of Time. Mead said that "The title came from the fact that I had all of my life up to that point to write the songs,". The album's 13 songs were culled from 32 demos. Released in September 1999, the album featured performances from Rusty Anderson (Paul McCartney), Kenny Aronoff (John Mellencamp, Smashing Pumpkins), and Paul Deakin (The Mavericks).

=== Mine and Yours ===
Mead's second album, Mine and Yours, produced by Adam Schlesinger (Fountains of Wayne), was recorded at New York City's Sear Sound studio (John Lennon, Steely Dan) and released in May 2001 on RCA. Featuring guest performances from Dominique Durand (Ivy), Sean Pelton (the Saturday Night Live band), Danny Weinkauf (They Might Be Giants), and Jody Porter (Fountains of Wayne), its 14 songs were recorded from 34 demos. Two of the album's most notable tracks, "Standing Here in Front of Me" and "Girl on the Roof," were written one week before recording commenced, after RCA asked for more "single material." "Standing Here in Front of Me" was later featured on CBS's The Bold and the Beautiful, and "Girl on the Roof" appeared in the motion pictures National Lampoon's Van Wilder and The Sweetest Thing, both released in April 2002.

=== Indiana ===
After Mine and Yours, Mead delivered a follow-up for RCA, but it was made after an A&R person for the label proclaimed that, given sales of Mead's first two albums, it was a "miracle" that a third was being recorded at all. The album was completed but ended up being shelved after BMG, RCA's parent company, merged RCA and J Records to form the RCA Music Group in 2003 and laid off approximately 50 staffers, including ones who worked in promotions, sales, and A&R; Mead and other artists were subsequently dropped from RCA's roster. He moved back to Nashville in late 2002 and, in between road gigs, started an EP with Nashville producer David Henry (Matthew Ryan, Guster); it soon turned into the full-length Indiana, released in May 2004 by Nettwerk America. Featuring "Nashville" and "Beauty".

=== Wherever You Are ===
Mead's third album for RCA, Wherever You Are, recorded in 2002 in Woodstock, New York, and Bath, England, finally emerged as a six-song EP in June 2005 via Eleven Thirty Records. Mead says.

I got the album back when I left [RCA] but felt, after releasing Indiana, that the full package was confusing and not indicative of where I was going musically anymore, so I tried to frame the songs as more [of] a lost piece of time.

PopMatters says that Wherever You Are contains "mature songs that express genuine warmth and emotional intelligence."

=== Tangerine ===
In 2005, Mead married artist Natalie Cox and began work on his fourth LP. Produced by Brad Jones (Jill Sobule, Butterfly Boucher, Josh Rouse), Tangerine was released in May 2006 courtesy of Mead's own Tallulah! Media (his contract with Nettwerk wasn't renewed after Indiana). Paste magazine described it as "the sound of a singer/songwriter finding his voice," and it was nominated in the category of Best Pop/Rock Album at the sixth annual Independent Music Awards in 2007 (Mead's website was nominated for Best Band-Website Design).

=== Almost and Always ===
In 2008, having spent the previous year living in Brooklyn, New York, Mead moved back to Nashville after he and his wife separated. Mead reunited with Brad Jones and recorded the intimate collection Almost and Always in seven days, most of it live. The majority of the album was co-written with Bill DeMain of Swan Dive; they originally conceived the project for an imaginary chanteuse. The track "Last Train Home" was an NPR Song of the Day and was featured in a 2009 episode of ABC's Private Practice. Mead and DeMain also co-wrote a second, as-yet-unreleased album, "1908 Division," a conceptual suite about the denizens of an apartment building where Mead once resided. Almost and Always was first released in Japan in October 2008, then in the United States ten months later on Cheap Lullaby Records.

=== Dudes ===
Mead's sixth album was "funded entirely by fans, friends and lovers". He raised $20,925 from 253 donors on Kickstarter in late 2010 to cover the recording, manufacturing, and distribution of Dudes and documented the recording sessions, which took place over nine days in New York City, on his YouTube channel in January 2011. Produced by Ethan Eubanks and Mead (Adam Schlesinger is credited as executive producer), the 12-song collection has strains of Randy Newman's humor ("Bocce Ball") and sharp storytelling ("The Smile of Rachael Ray," which was NPR's Song of the Day on December 14, 2011; Stephen Thompson called it "a new Christmas classic; a minor miracle worthy of the season that surrounds it"). Dudes was released in November 2011. Earlier that year, Mead married yoga instructor and nutritionist Liz Workman.

=== Cobra Pumps ===
On January 25, 2019, Mead sent an email to every address on his website's mailing list. "When it came time to figure [out] how to release COBRA PUMPS," he wrote,

I needed money and, out of habit, approached a few different music business people for help. After a few slightly bizarre meetings in which algorithmically-induced metrics and social media compliance were discussed with a ferocity once reserved for killer hooks and Led Zeppelin, I deduced that I simply don't fit into the industry anymore, if I ever did. It now requires very different skill sets than the ones I have spent my life attempting to master. And that is OK with me ...

Mead emailed links to the album's ten tracks, as well as demos and other content, over the next ten days. Cobra Pumps became available for purchase on iTunes on January 29 and on CD and vinyl at Mead's website several days later. To promote the album, Mead created a tongue-in-cheek LinkedIn page that listed various jobs and phases of his career.

=== January, San Fernando ===
Mead made his ninth studio album available for purchase on Bandcamp.com on April 24, 2025, and stated on Facebook that it "will be available to stream in its entirety in September."

== Influences ==
He draws on a wide range of influences, including the Beatles, Broadway, the Police, and Rufus Wainwright.

== Collaborations ==
Mead has been involved in two high-profile side projects. In 2009, he co-founded Elle Macho, a power trio with Aussie singer-songwriter and bassist Butterfly Boucher and drummer Lindsay Jamieson (Ben Folds, Brendan Benson). They've released two EPs, ¡Es Potencial! (2009) and VoVo (2016), and one full-length, Import (2013) (which includes all five tracks from ¡Es Potencial!).

Mead also formed Davey Ukulele & the Gag Time Gang, a quartet that released The Adventures of Davey Ukulele & the Gag Time Gang in 2010. Jim Ridley of Nashville Scene wrote,

Sounding like a cross between 'Whip It'-era Devo and the pop pastiches on Phineas and Ferb (a mighty high compliment in my household), this merry kids' band actually camouflages a genuine Nashville supergroup: the tag team of David Mead, Swan Dive's Bill DeMain, Brother Henry's David Henry and The Mavericks' Paul Deakin[.]

Several times a year, Mead travels to Key West, Florida, to perform in a cover band called Phanni Pac (with Jason White, Scotty Huff and Paul Deakin) at the Hog's Breath Saloon. He has also been a regular guest singer with Nashville's popular '80s cover band, Guilty Pleasures.

== Discography ==
- The Luxury of Time (RCA, 1999)
- Mine and Yours (RCA, 2001)
- Indiana (Nettwerk, 2004)
- Wherever You Are (EP; Eleven Thirty, 2005)
- Tangerine (Tallulah!, 2006)
- Almost and Always (Cheap Lullaby, 2009; originally released in Japan in 2008)
- Dudes (self-released, 2011)
- Cobra Pumps (self-released, 2019)
- January, San Fernando (self-released, 2025)

== In films and on television ==
"World of a King", in Boys and Girls (Miramax) and In Search of John Gissing (Sunlight Productions)

"Everyone Knows It But You", in Restaurant (York Entertainment)

"Girl on the Roof", in The Sweetest Thing (Columbia Pictures), National Lampoon's Van Wilder (Lionsgate), and The Future Diary, a pilot not picked up by ABC

"Only in the Movies", in Ed (NBC)

"Standing Here in Front of Me", in The Bold and the Beautiful (CBS)

"Beauty", in The Days (ABC)

"Only Living Boy in New York", in Everwood (WB)

"Hallelujah, I Was Wrong", in Men In Trees (ABC)

"Last Train Home", in Private Practice (ABC) and The Protector (Lifetime)
