= Josh Rouse and the Long Vacations =

Studio album by Josh Rouse
- Released: September 27, 2011
- Recorded: Giant Rabbit Studios, Valencia; Paco Loco Studios, El Puerto de Santa Maria, Spain
- Genre: Rock
- Length: 25:19
- Label: Bedroom Classics

Josh Rouse chronology
El Turista (2010)	Josh Rouse and the Long Vacations (2011)	The Happiness Waltz (2013)

Josh Rouse and the Long Vacations is the ninth studio album by American singer-songwriter Josh Rouse, released on September 27, 2011, on his own Bedroom Classics label.

Professional ratings
Aggregate scores
Source	Rating
Metacritic	74/100
Review scores
Source	Rating
AllMusic	3/5 stars

== Track listing ==
All tracks are written by Josh Rouse, unless otherwise noted.

No.	Title	Writer(s)	Length
1.	"Diggin' in the Sand"		2:11
2.	"Movin' On"		3:42
3.	"Fine, Fine"		2:33
4.	"To the Clock, To the City"		3:56
5.	"Bluebird St."		1:49
6.	"Lazy Days"		2:10
7.	"Oh, Look What the Sun Did!"		3:09
8.	"Friend"	Xema Fuertes, Rouse	3:10
9.	"Disguise"	Xema Fuertes, Rouse	2:39
