= Moonlight Road =

Studio album by The Silver Seas
- Released: January 1, 2018
- Genre: pop-rock
- Length: 39:50
- Label: self-released (North America)

The Silver Seas chronology
Alaska (2013)	Moonlight Road (2018)

Moonlight Road, the fifth album by the Silver Seas, was released on digital platforms on January 1, 2018, after briefly being made available on SoundCloud one week earlier. "The band still deliver on the memorable melodies and singalong choruses," wrote Eamon Carr of The Herald in the Dublin newspaper's December 29, 2017, edition, and "have edged closer to bursting into the mainstream."

== Track listing ==
1. "Good Sign" – 4:02
2. "Go Getter" – 3:19
3. "Neon" – 4:39
4. "Love (Won't Take Me Back)" – 4:00
5. "Even When You're Wrong" – 3:45
6. "Right Direction" – 3:09
7. "Wildlife" – 4:15
8. "You Give Me Faith" – 4:05
9. "Cecilia" – 3:28
10. "Colors" – 2:04
11. "Moonlight Road" – 3:04
