= Scary Fragile =

Studio album by Butterfly Boucher
- Released: June 2, 2009
- Recorded: 2005–2007
- Genre: Folk
- Label: Situation Operation
- Producers: Butterfly Boucher, David Kahne

Butterfly Boucher chronology
| Flutterby (2003) | Scary Fragile (2009) | Butterfly Boucher (2012) |

Professional ratings
Review scores
| Source | Rating |
|---|---|
| Allmusic | 4/5 stars |
| Paste | 8.5/10 stars |

Scary Fragile is the second album by Australian singer–songwriter Butterfly Boucher.

== History ==
After touring as an opening act for Sarah McLachlan's Afterglow tour, Boucher was called to the studio by her record label Geffen Records in 2004 to record the follow-up to her album Flutterby. Spending over a year deciding on producer David Kahne and waiting for him to become available, Boucher did most of the pre-production for the album at her home studio, doing the guitar, bass guitar, electronic keyboard, lead vocals and backing vocals Production for the album began on October 24, 2005. Although Boucher had intended to record the album with a live band, the idea was abandoned after Kahne listened to the demos Boucher had produced, and liked her playing all the instruments herself.

Scary Fragile was originally completed in January 2006. Claiming to not "want to be too deep" about her album titles, Boucher states the title was chosen because "it didn't mean anything", and "can mean whatever you want as well." The other title considered for the album was Just Because.

Not knowing how to market the album, Geffen stalled on releasing Scary Fragile before offering Boucher to affiliate Polydor Records to release the album in the United Kingdom first. After the album was found to be too "American-sounding" for the UK, Boucher re-recorded the album for the UK market with a Swedish producer. In February 2007, the album track "A Bitter Song" was used on the hit American television series Grey's Anatomy during a pivotal season arch, after which it was released as a single on iTunes. The re-recorded album was completed in June 2007, at which point Boucher began previewing one-off album tracks at irregular intervals on her MySpace page, on what she referred to as "Oops Days".

Although Polydor had set a release date for the album in autumn 2007, Geffen blocked the album' release, agreeing to allow the UK label to release the album only on the condition that the UK affiliate bought Boucher out of her debt to Interscope-Geffen-A&M for over US$1 million. Polydor refused, and after negotiations through 2008, Boucher was released from her record contract, and gained the master recording rights for both versions of Scary Fragile. Boucher released the album with the original recordings on June 2, 2009 digitally via her own imprint Situation Operation. The single "Gun for a Tongue" was released digitally on May 12, 2009. The album was released on Compact Disc in stores worldwide on September 15, 2009 via Nettwerk Records.

The song "Gun for a Tongue" served as the theme song for The Lying Game. The song "A Bitter Song" was sampled by $uicideboy$ on their song "Kill Yourself (Part III)".

== Track listing ==
- All songs written by Butterfly Boucher

| No. | Title | Length |
|---|---|---|
| 1. | "I Found Out" | 3:07 |
| 2. | "For the Love of Love" | 3:21 |
| 3. | "Just One Tear" | 3:30 |
| 4. | "Gun for a Tongue" | 3:08 |
| 5. | "Scary Fragile" | 3:04 |
| 6. | "Bright Red" | 3:32 |
| 7. | "Keeper" | 3:06 |
| 8. | "They Say You Grow" | 3:48 |
| 9. | "Keeping Warm" | 3:00 |
| 10. | "To Feel Love" | 4:13 |
| 11. | "A Bitter Song" | 2:30 |

Further tracks hosted on Butterfly's MySpace page during "Oops Days" that are off-cuts and do not feature on Scary Fragile:

1. "All of the Things"
2. "Looking at Me"
3. "Don't Look Now"
4. "You'll See"
