= The Smooth Sounds of Josh Rouse =

Studio album by Josh Rouse
- Released: 2004
- Genre: folk music/indie rock
- Label: Rykodisc

Josh Rouse chronology
1972 (2003)	The Smooth Sounds of Josh Rouse (2004)	Nashville (2005)

The Smooth Sounds of Josh Rouse is a CD/DVD combination album by Josh Rouse. It was released through Rykodisc in 2004.

== Track listing ==
The album contains a DVD and a CD.

=== DVD ===
1. "Comeback (Light Therapy)"
2. "Love Vibration"
3. "Sunshine (Come On Lady)"
4. "Under Your Charms"
5. "Slaveship"
6. "1972"
7. "Rise"
8. "Feeling No Pain"
9. "Miracle"
10. "Under Cold Blue Stars"
11. "Late Night Conversation"
12. "Directions"
13. "Flight Attendant"

=== CD ===
1. "Michigan"
2. "Princess On The Porch"
3. "Knights Of Loneliness"
4. "I Just Want To Live"
5. "A Well Respected Man"
6. "Kentucky Flood"
7. "Pittsburgh"
8. "Me Gusta Dormir"
9. "Scenes From A Bar In Toronto"
10. "Smile"
