= Tangerine (David Mead album) =

Studio album by David Mead
- Released: May 16, 2006
- Recorded: 2005
- Studio: Alex the Great Recording (Nashville, Tennessee)
- Genre: Pop-rock
- Length: 40:43
- Label: Tallulah!
- Producer: Brad Jones

David Mead chronology
Wherever You Are (2005)	Tangerine (2006)	Almost and Always (2008)

Professional ratings
Review scores
Source	Rating
AllMusic	4/5 stars
Tampa Bay Times	A

Tangerine is the fourth full-length album by singer-songwriter David Mead. Having been dropped by Nettwerk America after the release of his previous LP, Indiana, he created his own label, Tallulah!, in order to release Tangerine in 2006. "Mead's is some of the most consistently attractive, melodically pleasing, and intellectually rewarding pop music around, and it would really be a shame if he 'moved beyond' his most obvious strengths anytime soon," wrote Rick Anderson for AllMusic. "Few records this immediately attractive are still so interesting after repeated listens."

== Track listing ==
All tracks written by David Mead.

1. "Tangerine" – 1:40
2. "Hard to Remember" – 3:07
3. "The Trouble With Henry" – 3:07
4. "Chatterbox" – 4:16
5. "Reminded #1" – 2:43
6. "Hunting Season" – 4:19
7. "Fighting for Your Life" – 3:51
8. "Sugar on the Knees" – 3:35
9. "Hallelujah, I Was Wrong" – 2:37
10. "Suddenly, a Summer Night" – 3:42
11. "Making It Up Again" – 4:02
12. "Choosing Teams" – 3:44

== Personnel ==
- Keith Brogdon – drums ("The Trouble With Henry," "Chatterbox," "Hallelujah, I Was Wrong," "Making It Up Again")
- Chris Carmichael - violins, violas
- David Henry – cello
- Jim Hoke – saxophone, flute, penny whistle, autoharp
- Lindsay Jamieson – drums, percussion
- Brad Jones – bass guitars, Rhodes piano, grand piano, Hammond organ, harmonium, theremin, calliope, background vocals ("Chatterbox")
- David Mead – lead vocals, guitars (acoustic, electric, classical, steel-string, bass), ukulele, mandolin, pianos (Rhodes, grand, toy), clavinet, mellotron, vibraphone, glockenspiel
- Fessey Park – vocals ("Reminded #1," "Hallelujah, I Was Wrong," "Making It Up Again")

== Production notes ==
Recorded by Brad Jones and mastered by Jim DeMain. Illustrations by Natalie Cox Mead and art direction/layout by Heather Dryden.
