= The Happiness Waltz =

Studio album by Josh Rouse
- Released: March 19, 2013
- Recorded: Rio Bravo Studios, Valencia
- Genre: Rock, alternative country
- Length: 44:28
- Label: Yep Roc Records
- Producer: Brad Jones

Josh Rouse chronology
Josh Rouse and The Long Vacations (2011)	The Happiness Waltz (2013)	The Embers of Time (2015)

Singles from The Happiness Waltz
- 1. "Julie (Come Out of the Rain)" Released: March 19, 2013

The Happiness Waltz is the 10th studio album by American singer-songwriter Josh Rouse, released on March 19, 2013 on Yep Roc Records.

Professional ratings
Aggregate scores
Source	Rating
Metacritic	70/100
Review scores
Source	Rating
AllMusic	3/5 stars
Blurt	4/5 stars
musicOMH	3/5 stars

== Track listing ==
No.	Title	Writer(s)	Length
1.	"Julie (Come Out of the Rain)"	Josh Rouse, Daniel Tashian	3:24
2.	"Simple Pleasure"	Rouse	4:22
3.	"It's Good to Have You"	Brad Jones, Rouse	3:15
4.	"City People, City Things"	Blair Daily, Rouse	3:18
5.	"This Movie's Way Too Long"	Rouse	3:46
6.	"Our Love"	Rouse, Tashian	4:01
7.	"A Lot Like Magic"	Rouse, Tashian	4:18
8.	"Start Up a Family"	Rouse, Tashian	3:36
9.	"The Western Isles"	Jones, Rouse	3:04
10.	"Purple and Beige"	Rouse	4:30
11.	"The Ocean"	Rouse	4:39
12.	"The Happiness Waltz"	Rouse	2:42

== Weekly charts ==
Chart (2013)	Peak position
US Billboard 200	189
US Heatseekers Albums (Billboard)	6
US Independent Albums (Billboard)	29
US Top Rock Albums (Billboard)	49
