= Country Mouse City House =

Studio album by Josh Rouse
- Released: July 31, 2007
- Recorded: Puerto de Santa Maria, Spain
- Genre: Folk music Indie rock
- Length: 38:00
- Label: Bedroom Classics
- Producer: Josh Rouse, Paco Loco, Joe Pisapia

Josh Rouse chronology
| She's Spanish, I'm American (EP) (2007) | Country Mouse City House (2007) | Live Shepherds Bush Empire December 7th 2007 (2008) |

Professional ratings
Review scores
| Source | Rating |
|---|---|
| Music Box | 4/5 stars |
| Prefix Magazine | (6.5/10) |
| Allmusic | 4/5 stars |

Country Mouse City House is the seventh album by indie folk musician Josh Rouse. It was released in 2007 by Bedroom Classics.

== Track listing ==
All songs written by Josh Rouse unless otherwise noted

1. "Sweetie" (Josh Rouse, Paz Suay) — 4:51
2. "Italian Dry Ice" — 4:41
3. "Hollywood Bass Player" — 4:06
4. "God, Please Let Me Go Back" — 4:19
5. "Nice to Fit In" — 3:29
6. "Pilgrim" (Josh Rouse, Paz Suay) — 4:22
7. "Domesticated Lovers" (Josh Rouse, Paz Suay) — 3:28
8. "London Bridges" — 4:04
9. "Snowy" — 5:14
