= Love in the Modern Age =

Studio album by Josh Rouse
- Released: April 18, 2020
- Length: 34:41
- Label: Yep Roc
- Producers: Daniel Tashian; Josh Rouse

Josh Rouse chronology
The Embers of Time (2015)	Love in the Modern Age (2020)	The Holiday Sounds of Josh Rouse (2019)

Professional ratings
Aggregate scores
Source	Rating
Metacritic	68/100
Review scores
Source	Rating
AllMusic	4/5 stars
American Songwriter	2.5/5 stars
God Is in the TV	9/10
Paste	7.1/10

Love in the Modern Age is the twelfth studio album by American musician Josh Rouse. It was released on April 13, 2018 under Yep Roc Records.

== Critical reception ==
Love in the Modern Age was met with "generally favorable reviews from critics. At Metacritic, which assigns a weighted average rating out of 100 to reviews from mainstream publications, this release received an average score of 68, based on 8 reviews. Aggregator Album of the Year gave the release a 76 out of 100 based on a critical consensus of 7 reviews.

=== Accolades ===
Accolades for Love in the Modern Age
Publication	Accolade	Rank
God Is in the TV	God Is in the TV's 50 Best Albums of 2018	48

== Track listing ==
Love in the Modern Age track listing
No.	Title	Length
1.	"Salton Sea"	3:58
2.	"Ordinary People, Ordinary Lives"	4:02
3.	"Love in the Modern Age"	4:28
4.	"Businessman"	4:00
5.	"Women and the Wind"	3:51
6.	"Tropic Moon"	3:41
7.	"I'm Your Man"	3:18
8.	"Hugs and Kisses"	3:38
9.	"There Was a Time"	3:47

== Personnel ==
Adapted from Discogs

Musicians

- Josh Rouse – lead vocals, drums, guitar, producer
- Cayo Bellveser – organ (track 5, 9), keyboards (track 8), backing vocals (track 8)
- Liz Bohannon – backing vocals (tracks 3, 4)
- James Haggerty – bass (tracks 7, 9)
- Alfonso Luna – drums (track 4)
- Xema Fuertes – electric guitar (tracks 4, 7, 9), backing vocals (tracks 2, 7, 8), vibraphone (tracks 2, 5)
- David Gehrke – drums (track 4)
- Jim Hoke – saxophone (tracks 3, 4)
- Marc Pisapia – drums (tracks 7, 8, 9)

Production

- Daniel Tashian – producer, vocals, drums, guitar
- Greg Calbi – mastering
- David Shaw – art direction
- Paz Suay – art direction, backing vocals
- Joe Pisapia – mixing
- Nathan Golub – art direction
- York Wilson – photography

== Charts ==
Chart performance for Love in the Modern Age
Chart (2018)	Peak position
US Heatseekers Albums (Billboard)	21
US Independent Albums (Billboard)	45
