= Château Revenge! =

Studio album by The Silver Seas
- Released: July 6, 2010 (North America); September 19, 2011 (Europe)
- Genre: pop-rock
- Length: 41:27
- Label: self-released (North America); The Lights Label/EMI (Europe)
- Producer: Jason Lehning, Daniel Tashian

The Silver Seas chronology
High Society (2006)	Château Revenge! (2010)	Alaska (2013)

Château Revenge! is the third album by the Silver Seas. It was self-released by the band in North America in 2010 and, through a distribution deal with the Lights Label/EMI, in Europe the following year.

"The idea was to make a soundtrack to learning about the world of adult emotions, or romance, through the prism of television and movies," said Silver Seas frontman Daniel Tashian in a press release. "So I thought, 'Château Revenge!' It sounds like a movie I would have loved as a kid, and it would be a story of guy meets girl, guy meets bully, bully gets girl, guy fights bully, bully loses, guy gets girl back. But I lost track somewhere in the middle and it became more autobiographical. Sort of a composite of my own failed relationships, which are where you really learn. And it has some redemption in the end, and resolution, the way a real Hollywood ending should be."

== Track listing ==
All songs written by Daniel Tashian, except where noted.

1. "Another Bad Night's Sleep" (Tashian, Angelo Petraglia) – 3:11
2. "Jane" – 3:52
3. "The Best Things in Life" (Tashian, Jason Lehning, Carey Ott) – 3:47
4. "What's the Drawback?" (Tashian, Lehning) – 3:28
5. "Somebody Said Your Name" – 2:58
6. "Home & Dry" – 2:49
7. "From My Windowsill" – 3:08
8. "Candy" – 2:49
9. "What If It Isn't Out There?" (Tashian, Ott) – 4:29
10. "Help Is On the Way" – 4:15
11. "Those Streets" (Tashian, Ott) – 3:13
12. "Kid" – 3:35

== Personnel ==
- Chris Carmichael: strings (tracks: 3, 9, 12)
- John Deaderick: piano (10), synthesizer (7)
- Madi Diaz: backing vocals (2, 6 to 8, 10)
- Caitlin Evanson: strings (4, 7, 10, 12)
- David Gehrke: backing vocals (2, 5), drums, percussion (1 to 10)
- Greg Goodman: sound design (track: 9, 10)
- Luke Hebert: percussion (5)
- Rachel Huesenstamm: handclaps (5)
- Brad Jones: handclaps (3), string arrangement (3, 12)
- Jason Lehning: backing vocals (1, 6, 7, 12), electric guitar (1, 3, 8), electric piano (1, 2, 4 to 7, 9 to 12), synthesizer (12)
- Lex Price: acoustic guitar (8, 12), bass, mandolin (6)
- Daniel Tashian: acoustic guitar (1, 2, 4 to 6, 11), banjo (6), bongos (4), drum machine (2, 3, 9), electric guitar (1 to 5, 7 to 11), electric piano (3), lap steel guitar (1), lead vocals, string arrangement (7), strings synthesizer (6), vibraphone (10), xylophone (8)
- Jonathan Trebing: lap steel guitar (10)

== Production notes ==
Recorded at the Toy Box Studio in Nashville, Tenn.; additional recording at Alex the Great Recording and Jason Lehning and Daniel Tashian's respective studios. Engineered by Lehning, Tashian, Greg Goodman, Brad Jones, and Lij Shaw, with additional editing by Kyle Ford. Mixed by Lehning at the Compound except tracks 3, 4, 9, and 12, mixed by Jones at Alex the Great. Mastered by Jim DeMain at Yes Master Studios. Sleeve design by Carl Tashian; cover photo of Château de Maintenon by Eric Pouhier (licensed under Creative Commons BY-SA 3.0).

== Château Revenge! (Blue Edition) ==
Featuring a blue-tinted cover and alternate/acoustic versions of the original album's 12 songs, Château Revenge! (Blue Edition) was recorded with engineer Lij Shaw at the Toy Box Studio in Nashville in the fall of 2010 and released in MP3 format on January 18, 2011, in North America. It was also released on CD in Europe.

1. "Another Bad Night's Sleep" – 3:34
2. "Jane" – 4:04
3. "The Best Things in Life" – 5:14
4. "What's the Drawback?" – 3:23
5. "Somebody Said Your Name" – 4:18
6. "Home & Dry" – 2:44
7. "From My Windowsill" – 3:03
8. "Candy" – 2:42
9. "What If It Isn't Out There?" – 3:36
10. "Help Is On the Way" – 3:39
11. "Those Streets" – 3:32
12. "Kid" – 3:03
