= She's Spanish, I'm American =

EP by She's Spanish, I'm American
- Released: 26 December 2006 (digital); 30 January 2007 (USA); 5 March 2007 (International)
- Recorded: 2005, Valencia, Spain
- Genre: Folk
- Label: Bedroom Classics

She's Spanish, I'm American chronology
Kcrw.Com Presents... Josh Rouse Live With Guitar & Strings (2006)	She's Spanish, I'm American (2006)	Country Mouse City House (2007)

She's Spanish, I'm American is the self-titled debut EP from the folk / roots pop duo She's Spanish, I'm American, the side project that American singer-songwriter Josh Rouse formed with his Spanish girlfriend Paz Suay. It was released on CD, on Rouse's label, Bedroom Classics, on January 30, 2007.

== Track listing ==
All tracks written by Josh Rouse.

1. "Car Crash" – 3:43
2. "Jon Jon" – 3:08
3. "The Ocean Always Wins" – 3:53
4. "These Long Summer Days" – 3:18
5. "Answers" – 3:40
