= Flutterby =

Studio album by Butterfly Boucher
- Released: 7 October 2003
- Genre: Folk
- Length: 40:02
- Label: Universal (UK); A&M (US)
- Producer: Butterfly Boucher; Robin Eaton; Ron Fair; Brad Jones

Butterfly Boucher chronology
Flutterby (2003)	Scary Fragile (2008)

Professional ratings
Review scores
Source	Rating
AllMusic	link

Flutterby is the debut album by Australian singer-songwriter Butterfly Boucher, first released in 2003.

== Track listing ==
- All songs written by Butterfly Boucher, except where noted.

No.	Title	Length
1.	"Life Is Short"	3:06
2.	"Can You See the Lights?"	3:07
3.	"I Can't Make Me"	3:57
4.	"Another White Dash" (Boucher, Joshua Thomson)	3:21
5.	"Soul Back"	3:23
6.	"A Walk Outside"	3:52
7.	"Never Leave Your Heart Alone"	3:43
8.	"Busy"	2:59
9.	"A Beautiful Book"	3:26
10.	"Don't Point, Don't Scare It"	2:52
11.	"Never Let It Go"	3:11
12.	"Drift On"	3:05

Bonus tracks
No.	Title	Length
13.	"For a Song"	2:52
14.	"Gift Wrap"	3:54

== Personnel ==
- Butterfly Boucher – bass guitar, guitar, piano, violin, vocals
- Ron Fair – conductor
- John Goux – guitar
- David Henry – cello
- Lindsay Jamieson – drums
- Abe Laboriel, Jr. – drums

=== Production ===
- Producers: Butterfly Boucher, Robin Eaton, Ron Fair, Brad Jones
- Executive producer: Mike Dixon
- Engineers: Butterfly Boucher, Robin Eaton, Tal Herzberg, Brad Jones
- Mixing: Jack Joseph Puig
- Mastering: Brian Gardner, Ted Jensen
- Digital editing: Tal Herzberg
- Assistant: Anthony Kilhoffer
- Arranger: Butterfly Boucher
- Instrumentation: Butterfly Boucher
- String arrangements: Ron Fair
- Formatting: Liam Ward
- Concept: Butterfly Boucher
- Package design: Butterfly Boucher
- Layout design: Butterfly Boucher, Liam Ward
- Artwork: Butterfly Boucher
- Photography: Thomas Petillo, Tina Tyrell
- Cover photo: Thomas Petillo

== Charts ==
Chart (2004)	Peak position
US Heatseekers Albums (Billboard)	35
