= Dressed Up Like Nebraska =

Studio album by Josh Rouse
- Released: April 28, 1998
- Studio: David Henry's house and True Tone Studios, Nashville, Tennessee
- Genre: Folk music, indie rock
- Length: 41:36
- Label: Slow River/Rykodisc
- Producer: Josh Rouse, David Henry

Josh Rouse chronology
| Dressed Up Like Nebraska (1998) | Chester EP (1999) |

Dressed Up Like Nebraska is the first album by indie folk musician Josh Rouse. It was released in the United States on April 28, 1998, by Rykodisc sub-label Slow River.

Rouse began recording the album on an 8-track recorder in his living room. The album was co-produced by former Cowboy Junkies touring member David Henry, who also played bass and cello and provided backing vocals.

== Reception ==
Professional ratings
Review scores
| Source | Rating |
|---|---|
| AllMusic | 4/5 stars |

The album received a positive response from critics, with Glen Sarvady in CMJ New Music Monthly stating "Rouse is a songwriter with potential, and much of it is already realized on this debut disc." His fellow CMJ writer Jonathan Perry called the album "a strikingly poised debut brimming with graceful, evocative songs about regret and desire". It received a four-star review from AllMusic, with James Chrispell describing it as "one of those classic discs one hears about, but seldom hears". Billboard described it as "a dark-horse gem...one beguiling record". The album received three and half stars for performance and three stars for sonics from Stereophile magazine. The album also received a positive review from Les Inrockuptibles.

== Track listing ==
All tracks composed by Josh Rouse.

1. "Suburban Sweetheart" — 2:49
2. "Dressed Up Like Nebraska" — 3:25
3. "Invisible" — 3:34
4. "Late Night Conversation" — 3:54
5. "Flair" — 4:26
6. "The White Trash Period of My Life" — 6:46
7. "A Simple Thing" — 4:10
8. "A Woman Lost in Serious Problems" — 3:14
9. "Lavina" — 4:15
10. "Reminiscent" — 5:10
