= The Embers of Time =

Studio album by Josh Rouse
- Released: April 6, 2015
- Recorded: Alex the Great, Nashville; Puerto De Santa Maria, Spain; Rio Bravo Studios, Valencia
- Genre: Americana
- Length: 33:41
- Label: Yep Roc Records
- Producer: Brad Jones

Josh Rouse chronology
The Happiness Waltz (2013)	The Embers of Time (2015)	Love in the Modern Age (2018)

Singles from The Embers of Time
- 1. "Some Days I'm Golden All Night" Released: February 24, 2015

Professional ratings
Aggregate scores
Source	Rating
Metacritic	76/100
Review scores
Source	Rating
AllMusic	3.5/5 stars
Exclaim!	8/10

The Embers of Time is the 11th studio album by American singer-songwriter Josh Rouse, released on April 6, 2015 on Yep Roc.

== Track listing ==
All tracks are written by Josh Rouse, unless otherwise noted.

No.	Title	Writer(s)	Length
1.	"Some Days I'm Golden All Night"		3:20
2.	"Too Many Things on My Mind"		2:50
3.	"New Young"		3:30
4.	"You Walked Through the Door"		3:22
5.	"Time"		3:13
6.	"Pheasant Feather"		3:20
7.	"Coat for a Pillow"		3:27
8.	"JR Worried Blues"		3:06
9.	"Ex-Pat Blues"	Brad Jones, Josh Rouse	3:03
10.	"Crystal Falls"		4:30

== Weekly charts ==
Chart (2015)	Peak position
US Heatseekers Albums (Billboard)	12
US Independent Albums (Billboard)	48
