= Subtítulo =

Studio album by Josh Rouse
- Released: March 21, 2006
- Genres: Folk music, indie rock
- Label: Nettwerk Records
- Producer: Brad Jones

Josh Rouse chronology
Bedroom Classics, Vol. 2 (2005)	Subtítulo (2006)	Kcrw.Com Presents... Josh Rouse Live With Guitar & Strings (2006)

Professional ratings
Aggregate scores
Source	Rating
Metacritic	68/100
Review scores
Source	Rating
AllMusic	4/5 stars
The A.V. Club	B
Pitchfork	3.7/10

Subtítulo is the sixth album by indie folk musician Josh Rouse. Released in 2006, it was his first album for Nettwerk Records.

== Track listing ==
1. "Quiet Town" (Josh Rouse, Daniel Tashian) — 2:31
2. "Summertime" (Josh Rouse) — 2:23
3. "It Looks Like Love" (Josh Rouse) — 3:46
4. "La Costa Blanca" (Josh Rouse) — 2:26
5. "Jersey Clowns" (Josh Rouse) — 4:15
6. "His Majesty Rides" (Josh Rouse) — 3:39
7. "Givin' It Up" (Josh Rouse) — 3:31
8. "Wonderful" (Josh Rouse) — 3:48
9. "The Man Who... (featuring Paz Suay)" (Josh Rouse) — 3:43
10. "El Otro Lado" (Josh Rouse) — 3:06
11. "The Clear Coast (featuring Gary Louris)" — 3:36 (iTunes Bonus Track)

== Personnel ==
- Josh Rouse: vocals, guitars
- Brad Jones: bass, keyboards
- Mac Pisapia: drums, percussion
- Pete Finney: Pedal Steel
- Paz Suay: vocals
- Chris Carmichael: strings
- Produced, recorded and mixed by Brad Jones at Paco Loco Studios (Puerto de Santa Maria, Spain) and Alex The Great Studios, Nashville, TN (US)
- Mastered by Jim Demain at yest Master, Nashville, TN
- Production coordinator: Iante Zevos
- Artwork: Paz Suay
