= 1972 (album) =

Studio album by Josh Rouse
- Released: August 26, 2003
- Recorded: 2003
- Studio: Alex the Great Studios, Nashville, TN; Bedroom Classics Studios, Nashville, TN
- Genre: Folk music/Indie rock
- Length: 43:02
- Label: Rykodisc
- Producer: Brad Jones

Josh Rouse chronology
Under Cold Blue Stars (2002)	1972 (2003)	The Smooth Sounds of Josh Rouse (2004)

Professional ratings
Aggregate scores
Source	Rating
Metacritic	81/100
Review scores
Source	Rating
AllMusic	4/5 stars
Blender	3/5 stars
The Guardian	4/5 stars
The Independent	4/5 stars
Mojo	3/5 stars
Now	3/5
Pitchfork	7.0/10
Q	4/5 stars
Rolling Stone	4/5 stars
Uncut	4/5 stars

1972 is the fourth album by indie folk musician Josh Rouse. It was released on Rykodisc on August 26, 2003.

== Track listing ==
All tracks are written by Josh Rouse.

No.	Title	Length
1.	"1972"	3:48
2.	"Love Vibration"	4:51
3.	"Sunshine (Come on Lady)"	2:54
4.	"James"	5:01
5.	"Slaveship"	3:10
6.	"Comeback (Light Therapy)"	4:38
7.	"Under Your Charms"	3:45
8.	"Flight Attendant"	4:46
9.	"Sparrows Over Birmingham"	4:59
10.	"Rise"	5:10

== Personnel ==
- Josh Rouse - Vocals, Guitars, Bells (6)
- James Haggerty - Bass Guitar (1, 6, 8)
- Curt Perkins - Piano (1, 8), Vibraphone (1), Wurlitzer Piano (2, 6), Keyboard (4), Backing Vocals (4), Rhodes Piano (7), Harmonium (8),
- Marc Pisapia - Drums (1-8, 10), Percussion (1, 3-8, 10)
- Chris Carmichael - Strings (1, 4, 6, 7)
- Brad Jones - Bass (2-5, 7, 9-10), Organ (2-3, 9), Vibraphone (3, 10), Piano (5), Wurlitzer Piano (10)
- Jim Hoke - Flute (2, 4, 6) Saxophone (2, 4, 6, 8)
- Joe Pisapia - Guitar Solo (4)
- Katie Cook - Backing Vocals (1)
- The Sweathogs - Backing Vocals (2, 5)
- Tim Keegan - Backing Vocals (4)
- James Nixon - Backing Vocals (9)
