= Tangerine (Mangan novel) =

2018 novel

- First edition
- Author: Christine Mangan
- Language: English
- Published: 2018
- Publisher: Ecco Press
- Media type: Hardcover; Paperback; Audio
- Pages: 320

Tangerine is a 2018 debut novel by Christine Mangan published by Ecco Press.

== Plot ==
Two former college roommates, Alice and Lucy, are reunited in Tangier in 1956 where Alice lives with her husband, John. Lucy, still dangerously obsessed with Alice, arrives in Tangier unannounced, eager to pick up where their relationship ended, badly.

== Critical reception ==
The New Yorker wrote "'Tangerine' is over the top, but it is also endearing and even impressive in the force of its determination to conjure a life more exciting than most lives are."

The New York Times said "At times, 'Tangerine' reads as if it were reverse-engineered from a scholarly paper about suspense fiction. Happily, you can write a satisfying, juicy thriller this way, if not a blazingly original one."
