= Nashville (Josh Rouse album) =

Studio album by Josh Rouse
- Released: February 22, 2005
- Recorded: Nashville, Tennessee, USA
- Genre: Folk music Indie rock
- Length: 39:40
- Label: Rykodisc
- Producer: Brad Jones

Josh Rouse chronology
The Smooth Sounds of Josh Rouse (2004)	Nashville (2005)	Bedroom Classics, Vol. 2 (2005)

Professional ratings
Aggregate scores
Source	Rating
Metacritic	80/100
Review scores
Source	Rating
AllMusic	4.5/5 stars
Blender	3/5 stars
Entertainment Weekly	A−
The Independent	4/5 stars
The Irish Times	4/5 stars
Mojo	3/5 stars
Now	4/5
Pitchfork	6.6/10
Q	4/5 stars
Uncut	4/5 stars

Nashville is the fifth album by American indie folk musician Josh Rouse. It was released in 2005 by Rykodisc.

== Track listing ==
1. "It's the Nighttime" (Josh Rouse, Daniel Tashian) — 4:04
2. "Winter in the Hamptons" (Rouse, Tashian) — 3:08
3. "Streetlights" (Rouse) — 4:24
4. "Carolina" (Rouse) — 3:31
5. "Middle School Frown" (Rouse) — 3:24
6. "My Love Has Gone" (Rouse) — 4:19
7. "Saturday" (Rouse) — 4:22
8. "Sad Eyes" (Rouse, Sean Kelly) — 4:49
9. "Why Won't You Tell Me What" (Rouse) — 3:50
10. "Life" (Rouse, Tashian) — 3:47
