= Butterfly Boucher =

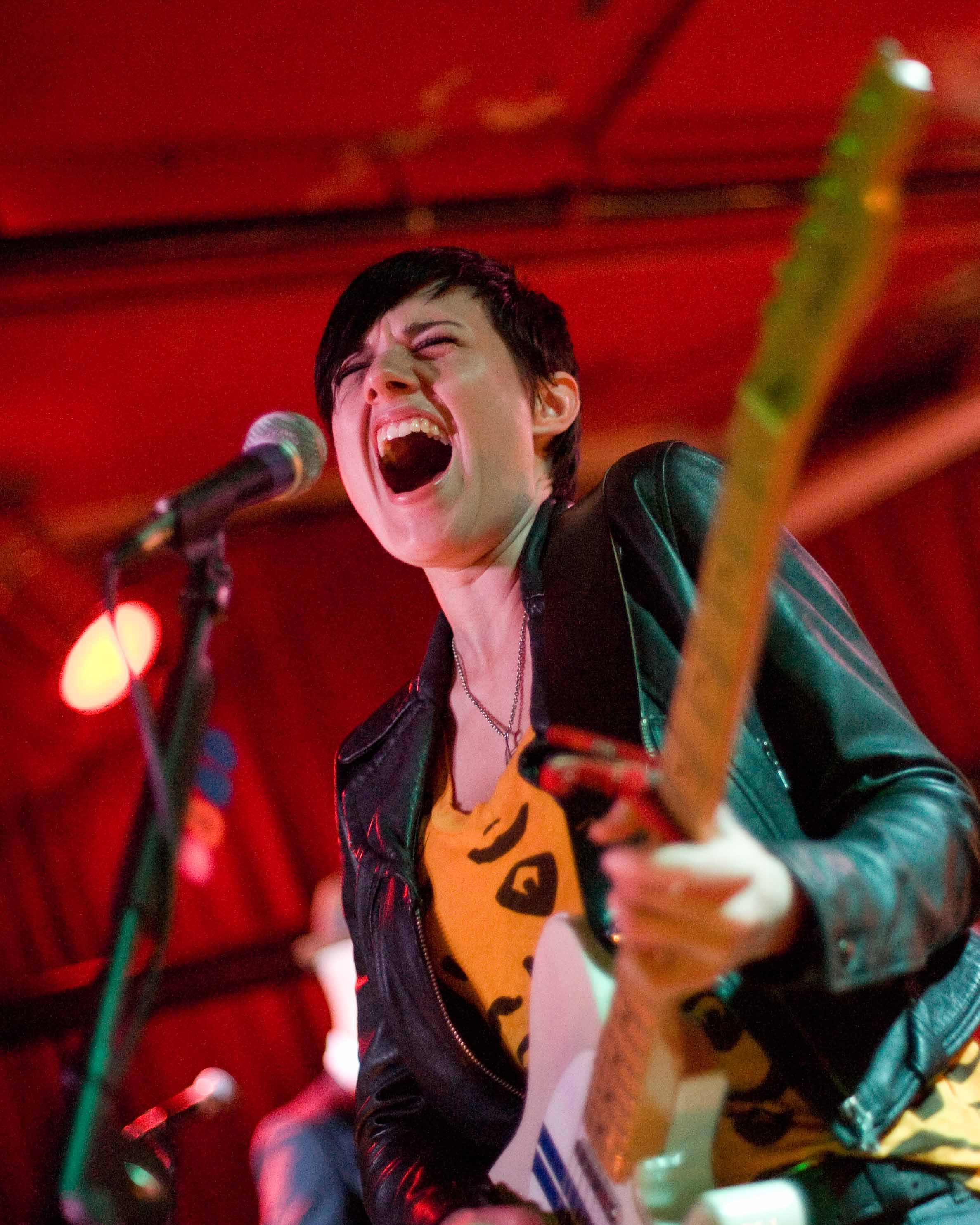
- Butterfly Boucher performing with Ten Out of Tenn; Seattle, Washington, 4 December 2009

Background information
- Born: Butterfly Giselle Grace Boucher; 2 June 1979 (age 47); Adelaide, Australia
- Genres: Rock, pop, alternative rock
- Occupations: Musician, songwriter, producer, arranger
- Instruments: Vocals, guitar, bass, drums, keyboards, piano, tambourine
- Years active: 1994–present
- Labels: Universal, A&M, Situation Operation
- Website: www.butterflyboucher.com

Butterfly Giselle Grace Boucher /ˈbaʊtʃər/ (born 2 June 1979) is an Australian singer-songwriter, multi-instrumentalist and record producer born in Adelaide. From the age of 15 years she played bass guitar in her older sister Rebecca Boucher Burns (Becca)'s band Eat the Menu (later named The Mercy Bell), which issued a debut album, Whoosh, in 1996. Since mid-2000 Boucher has lived in Nashville, United States, and has released four solo albums, Flutterby (October 2003), Scary Fragile (June 2009), a self-titled album (April 2012), and a 10th-anniversary celebration of Flutterby called Happy Birthday Flutterby (23 August 2014). Since 2008, Boucher has recorded material for Ten Out of Tenn, a Nashville-based music collective. Boucher is also a member of the pop rock trio Elle Macho.

== Biography ==
Butterfly Giselle Grace Boucher was born on 2 June 1979 in Adelaide, the fourth of seven daughters. Her first name, Butterfly, was a suggestion from a friend of the family. Her parents are Vivienne, a ballet dancer, and Rodney "Rod" Boucher. Rod had a career as a professional singer/musician during the 1970s and 1980s specialising in Christian and rock music. Boucher's sisters are Danielle Boucher (later a film director, actor, production designer), Rebecca Boucher Burns (now in band Belle of the Ball), Sunshine Boucher March (a ceramicist), Eden (born ca. 1981, member of Lovers Electric, and known for clothing design as 'Eden honeydew'), Angelle (a former model), and Harmony (singer of Vuvuvultures and a Models 1 model). Her family travelled outback Australia during Boucher's early years.

From the age of 15 years, Boucher played bass guitar for Eat the Menu (later renamed The Mercy Bell), which was formed in Brisbane in 1992 by her sister Becca on lead vocals, and Josh Thomson on guitars and backing vocals. In June 1996, Eat the Menu issued an album, Whoosh, with a line-up of Boucher, Becca, Thomson and Dale Rankine on drums. Whoosh was re-released a year later under the band's new name, The Mercy Bell through Polydor records - but Boucher became disillusioned working with the major label, "I don't think they did any promotion for that first record. There weren't even posters. It was like suddenly we were signed, but it didn't change anything". Plans for the release of the second album never came into fruition due to the label being bought by Universal. In 1998, The Mercy Bell relocated to the United States – Nashville and signed to Interscope Records, Universal in Los Angeles. When the deal came to an abrupt end six months later due to Tom Whalley leaving to Warners the band played their last few shows in Nashville and moved to London, United Kingdom to seek new avenues. While The Mercy Bell was in hiatus, Boucher was working on her solo material, initially in Stockton, UK. By mid-2000, she had returned to live in Nashville. Thomson returned to Australia and Becca settled in the UK to form Belle of the Ball with her husband Benjamin Burns (jimmy Styles and the Easy Company) - in 2011 they performed a travelling "lo-fi pop event", Burns Bistro.

On 7 October 2003, Boucher released her debut solo album, Flutterby, on Universal and A&M Records. She co-produced and co-engineered it with Robin Eaton, Ron Fair, and Brad Jones at Alex the Great Studios in Nashville, Tennessee. AllMusic's Robert L. Doerschuk described Flutterby as "[a] low-key tour de force, [it] reflects an uncommon maturity and breadth of talent, particularly for a debut effort. Boucher commands all the essential instruments; more than that, she layers her parts with an ear toward sounding like a solid backup band, as opposed to showing off. Her lyrics, which adhere to the confessional/heartache model, can revolve around unanswered questions". The album peaked in the top 40 of Billboard's Top Heatseekers. In the next month Boucher issued her first single off the album, "I Can't Make Me", and followed with "Another White Dash". The latter track had been written by Boucher, Becca and Thomson of The Mercy Bell, which appeared on Billboard's Adult Top 40. During 2004 Boucher toured the US and Europe, opening for Barenaked Ladies, and then for Sarah McLachlan on the latter's Afterglow Tour.

Boucher started work on a second album, Scary Fragile, in 2005 and it was delivered to the A&M label in January 2006. In February 2007 the track, "A Bitter Song", from the album, featured on an episode of the TV series, Grey's Anatomy, it was available on iTunes for digital download on 27 February. After various delays due to producer, label and legal concerns Scary Fragile was released independently on 2 June 2009. Boucher reflected on her problems with major labels, "[t]hat's what was so frustrating. I had been there before and I managed to do it again ... I wasted those three years and lost my love of music in the process, trying to figure out what other people wanted". To promote the album's appearance Boucher issued a single, "Gun for a Tongue", in May and toured the US from May to July that year. In 2008 different Boucher family members contributed to the film, The Burial: Butterfly Boucher and Becca co-wrote two tracks which were performed by The Mercy Bell; Rod had the role as 'The Priest'; Vivi was a catering manager; Danielle co-directed, co-designed, acted as "The Mother' and co-wrote; Sunshine, Angelle and Harmony were catering assistants; and Eden co-designed production, acted as 'Nurse' and designed costumes.

Boucher is part of the musical collective, Ten Out of Tenn, which formed in Nashville in 2005; since 2008 Boucher appeared on various compilation or Christmas albums including, Ten Out of Tenn Compilation (Vol. 2), Ten Out of Tenn Christmas (both 2008), Any Day Now (2009), We Are all in This Together (2010) and Ten Out of Tenn Compilation (Vol. 4) (2011). In July and August 2010, McLachlan invited Boucher to perform on the renewed Lilith Fair tour, where Boucher met fellow Australian singer-songwriter Missy Higgins, the pair share songwriting for a number of tracks including, "Unashamed Desire". In 2011, Boucher and Brad Jones, co-produced Higgins' album, The Ol' Razzle Dazzle (June 2012), at Alex the Great Studios, Nashville. Both Boucher and Higgins recorded their own version of "Unashamed Desire": Boucher's appeared on her self-titled album which was released 13 April 2012, Higgins' version was issued as a single and appeared on The Ol' Razzle Dazzle. In 2011 Boucher toured with McLachlan, playing bass guitar and singing vocals. She also performs and records bass guitar and vocals as part of Elle Macho, a Nashville-based trio she formed with guitarist David Mead and drummer Lindsay Jamieson. Elle Macho will release their debut album on 5 February 2013. In August 2012, Boucher supported Higgins on an Australian tour that was followed, in September, by a tour of the US with Katie Herzig (fellow Ten out of Tenn member) added to the bill.

In October 2014, she released "Happy Birthday Flutterby" — a fully re-recorded version of her first album, Flutterby, on the occasion of its 10th anniversary. Unlike the original, which she recorded on her own, the remake enlisted help from other musicians, including Sarah McLachlan, Sara Bareilles, Katie Herzig.

== In media ==
Butterfly Boucher recorded a version of David Bowie's song "Changes" with him, on the Shrek 2: Motion Picture Soundtrack, released in May 2004, for the film of the same name. Boucher's own songs have been featured on various TV programs. In July to August 2004, the short-lived ABC series, The Days used "Life is Short" as its opening theme. TV drama series Grey's Anatomy featured both "Never Leave Your Heart Alone" and "Life is Short" in its first season (2005), and debuted "A Bitter Song" from her then-unreleased album Scary Fragile in the third-season episode "Drowning on Dry Land" (2007). In addition, the title song "Scary Fragile" also featured in the pilot for the ABC Family show, Switched at Birth. The song "Gun for a Tongue" served as the theme song for The Lying Game.

Flutterby was the source of songs on the fantasy television series Charmed. "Life is Short" was used in the episode "Spin City", and the episode "Show Ghouls" features a version of the track "I Can't Make Me" remixed by Chris Lord-Alge, which is later included in soundtrack album, Charmed: The Book of Shadows.

The single "It Pulls Me Under" was featured in the film Where We're Meant to Be (2016) as well as the short film Break Free (2014) by Ruby Rose. Boucher later recorded and co-wrote an original song for the 2017 film Wonder entitled "Break the Rules".

Boucher co-wrote several songs and appears on Dawson Wells' debut album Re: No Subject, for which she played instruments, including drums, guitar, piano and keyboards, tambourine and bass. She provided lead and backup vocals on most of the songs, including a duet with Dawson called "Gracey and Henry Martin's First Summer". Compositions she penned with Wells on that album are "Say Anything", "Silly One", "Being in Love".

Her 2009 song, "A Bitter Song", was sampled by New Orleans rap duo Suicideboys in their song, "Kill Yourself III"

== Discography ==
According to AllMusic, Butterfly Boucher is credited with: guitars (lead, bass, seven-string electric, acoustic, baritone), piano, violin, vocals (lead, backing), drums, animal sounds, keyboards, organ, percussion, programming, arranger, art direction, artwork, layout design, package design, composer, engineer, mixer, producer, and video director.

=== Albums ===
List of albums, with selected details
Title	Details
Flutterby	Released: October 2003; Format: CD; Label: A&M Records (9860775)
Scary Fragile	Released: June 2009; Format: CD; Label: Nettwerk (0 6700 30860 2 8)
Butterfly Boucher	Released: April 2012; Format: CD, Digital; Label: Situation Operation
Happy Birthday Flutterby	Released: November 2013; Format: CD, Digital; Label: Situation Operation; Note: A re-recording of Flutterby

=== Singles ===
List of singles, with selected chart positions
Title	Year	Peak chart positions	Album
Title	Year	AUS	Album
"I Can't Make Me"	2003	85	Flutterby
"Another White Dash"	2004	—	Flutterby
"A Bitter Song"	2007	—	Scary Fragile
"Gun for a Tongue"	2009	—	Scary Fragile
"5678!"	2012	—	Butterfly Boucher
"It Pulls Me Under"	2014	—	Non-album single

=== Collaborations and guest performances ===
- "I'm Different" (on For the Kids Too!) 19 October 2004
- "Changes" with David Bowie on Shrek 2 soundtrack 2004
- ¡Es Potencial! (with Elle Macho) 6 October 2009
- "Too Late, Farewell" (with Delerium) on Voice: An Acoustic Collection 5 October 2010
- "Absolute Beginners" (with Cary Brothers) on Covers Volume One EP 15 May 2012
- "Conquistador" (Single) (with Elle Macho) 5 February 2013
- "Import" (with Elle Macho) 5 February 2013

== Awards and nominations ==
=== EG Awards / Music Victoria Awards ===
The EG Awards (known as Music Victoria Awards since 2013) are an annual awards night celebrating Victorian music. They commenced in 2006.

Year	Nominee / work	Award	Result
2012	Butterfly Boucher	Best Female	Nominated
