= Tangerine Bowl =

Tangerine Bowl may refer to:

- Tangerine Bowl (1947–1982), a college football bowl game now known as the Citrus Bowl
- Tangerine Bowl (2001–2003), three editions of the college football bowl game originally known as the Blockbuster Bowl and now the Pop-Tarts Bowl
- Tangerine Bowl (stadium), now known as Camping World Stadium; known as the Tangerine Bowl or Tangerine Bowl Stadium from 1947 to 1975

== See also ==
- Orange Bowl
- Tangerine (disambiguation)
