= El Turista =

Studio album by Josh Rouse
- Released: February 1, 2010
- Genres: Acoustic, pop rock
- Length: 36:25
- Labels: Bedroom Classics; Yep Roc
- Producers: Josh Rouse, Brad Jones

Professional ratings
Review scores
Source	Rating
The A.V. Club	C+
PopMatters	8/10 stars

El Turista is a studio album by the singer-songwriter Josh Rouse. The album was released by Rouse in 2010 via his Bedroom Classics label.

== Track listing ==
1. Bienvenido – 2:18
2. Duerme – 4:11
3. Lemon Tree – 3:05
4. Sweet Elaine – 4:28
5. Mesie Julian – 2:37
6. I Will Live on Islands – 3:03
7. Valencia – 4:37
8. Cotton Eye Joe – 3:58
9. Las Voces – 3:53
10. Don't Act Tough – 4:23

=== Digital bonus tracks ===
1. To the Clock, To the City – 3:53
2. Oh, Look What the Sun Did! – 2:40
3. Lazy Days With Josephine – 2:09
