= Swan Dive =

American bossa nova/pop musical duo

Swan Dive is an American musical duo composed of Bill DeMain and Molly Felder. Founded in 1995, Swan Dive is best known for its album Circle, released in 1998.

Swan Dive has appeared on Late Night with Conan O'Brien, and opened shows for Norah Jones, Over the Rhine and Sixpence None the Richer, and their music has been heard on television shows such as Felicity, The L Word and Unfabulous. The group has attracted fans both on the local scene and abroad, particularly Japan, Korea and Thailand, where they've earned four Top 10 singles along with television appearances and multi-city tours. In early 2002, Swan Dive's Circle won in The 1st Annual Independent Music Awards for Pop Song.

Bill DeMain is a Grammy-nominated writer (The Look of Love: The Burt Bacharach Collection) and freelance journalist, whose songs have been recorded by Teddy Thompson & Kelly Jones, Marshall Crenshaw, Jill Sobule, Amy Rigby, Marti Jones and others. Molly Felder has also sung jingles on a number of national advertising campaigns including Pepsi, Michelob and Chevrolet, and has backed well-known artists including Don Henley, Amy Grant and Michael McDonald.

== Discography ==
=== Main albums ===
- Wintergreen (1997)
- You're Beautiful (1997)
- Circle (1998)
- Swan Dive (2000)
- June (2001)
- Words You Whisper (2002)
- William & Marlys (2004)
- Popcorn & a Mama Who Loves Me Too (2005)
- Until (2007)
- Mayfair (2009)
- Soundtrack to Me and You (2014)
- Stop Buying Things (2026, single)
- Jenny (2026, single, featuring Jill Sobule)

=== Compilations ===
- Groovy Tuesday/Rarities (2004)
- You're Beautiful/Words You Whisper (2004)
- June/Better to Fly (2008)
- Best Of and Besides (2009)

=== Singles & EPs ===
- Circle (1998)
- Electronic (2000)
- "Extended Stay" (2011) (Bill DeMain solo EP)
- "Vaudeville EP" (2021) (Bill DeMain solo EP)
- Stop Buying Things (2026)
- Jenny (2026)

=== Music videos ===
There are videos for the following songs: "Th Day That I Went Home," "Groovy Tuesday," "Circle," "Tender Love" and "Until." YouTube also features numerous live performance videos, from 1997-2025.
