= Slow River Records =

American independent record label

Slow River Records was a Marblehead, Massachusetts-based independent record label.

== History ==
Slow River Records was established by producer and musician George Howard in 1993. He operated it along with Anna Johansson. It obtained enough income and distribution capabilities to release its first record (a 7" by Desk) from singles released by Howard's band, the Lotus Eaters, on Harriet Records. In 1995, it entered into a joint venture with Rykodisc. In 1997, it was reported that the two labels had entered into a "wide-ranging agreement" whereby Rykodisc would give money to Slow River to help distribute and market each album that Slow River released.

== Notable artists ==
- The Buckets
- Richard Buckner, whose 1993 debut album Bloomed was reissued by Slow River in 1999
- Charlie Chesterman of Scruffy the Cat
- Ed's Redeeming Qualities
- Future Bible Heroes
- Juicy
- Josh Rouse
- Tom Leach
- Lincoln '65
- Sparklehorse
- Lauren Hoffman
- Chuck E. Weiss
- Peter Bruntnell
- Willard Grant Conspiracy
