= Josh Rouse =

American singer-songwriter (born 1972)

Background information
- Born: March 9, 1972 (age 54); Oshkosh, Nebraska, United States
- Origin: Tennessee, United States
- Genres: Folk, indie pop, alt-country
- Occupation: Singer-songwriter
- Instruments: Vocals, guitar, harmonica
- Years active: 1990-present
- Labels: Nettwerk, Rykodisc, Bedroom Classics, Yep Roc, New West Records
- Formerly of: She's Spanish, I'm American
- Website: joshrouse.com

Josh Rouse (born March 9, 1972) is an American folk/indie pop singer-songwriter. Originally from Nebraska, Rouse began his recording career in Nashville in 1998 and later relocated to Spain. In 2014, Rouse won a Spanish Goya Film Award in the category of Best Original Song for "Do You Really Want To Be In Love?" from the motion picture La Gran Familia Española.

== Biography ==
Born in the rural town of Oshkosh, Nebraska, he moved to various places during his childhood including Utah, California, Wyoming, and Georgia. He began writing songs aged 18, and following his nomadic childhood, he eventually moved to Clarksville, Tennessee to attend college (although he soon dropped out and moved to Nashville, Tennessee and worked as a parking valet), where he met some local musicians and began recording.

The initial recordings he put to tape eventually became his debut release, Dressed Up Like Nebraska (1998). The album received critical acclaim from music writers. Billboard wrote that it was "a dark-horse gem", and "[a]s pure and unpretentious as any singer-songwriter album issued this year". He went on to collaborate with Kurt Wagner on an EP the following year, and toured in support of artists such as Mark Eitzel, Aimee Mann, and Vic Chesnutt. Home (2000) and Under Cold Blue Stars (2002) followed before he began a working relationship with producer Brad Jones on 1972, released in 2003. "Directions" from Home was used on the soundtrack to Cameron Crowe's film Vanilla Sky.

After his first marriage ended, Rouse relocated to Spain to be with his then girlfriend (and now wife) Paz Suay and has resided there off and on since 2004. His last album recorded before the move, Nashville, was released in 2005 and reached number 66 on the UK Albums Chart. Rouse and Suay moved back to the US to promote his 2007 album Country Mouse City House, but they returned to Spain after Suay became pregnant. He collaborated with Suay as 'She's Spanish, I'm American', the duo releasing a self-titled EP in 2007. His music took on Spanish and Latin American influences and albums such as El Turista included songs sung in Spanish.

Rouse and Suay have two children.

On November 1, 2019, Rouse released the holiday album The Holiday Sounds Of Josh Rouse.

In 2026, Rouse signed with New West Records, and released a new album, Museums and Women.

== Discography ==
Studio albums

- Dressed Up Like Nebraska (1998)
- Home (2000)
- Under Cold Blue Stars (2002)
- 1972 (2003)
- Nashville (2005)
- Subtítulo (2006)
- Country Mouse City House (2007)
- El Turista (2010)
- Josh Rouse and The Long Vacations (2011)
- The Happiness Waltz (2013)
- The Embers of Time (2015)
- Love in the Modern Age (2018)
- The Holiday Sounds of Josh Rouse (2019)
- Going Places (2022)
- Streets of Your Town (2025)
- Museums and Women (2026)

EPs and mini-albums

- Chester with Kurt Wagner (1999)
- Bedroom Classics, Vol. 1 (2001)
- Bedroom Classics, Vol. 2 (2005)
- She's Spanish, I'm American with Paz Suay (2007)
- Bedroom Classics, Vol. 3 (2008)
- Bedroom Classics, Vol. 4 (2016)

Soundtracks

- La Gran Familia Española (Original Score) (2013)

Compilations

- The Smooth Sounds of Josh Rouse (2004)
- The Best of the Rykodisc Years (2008)

Singles

- "Directions" (2000)
- "Christmas With Jesus" (2001)
- "Feeling No Pain" (2002)
- "Nothing Gives Me Pleasure" (2002)
- "Love Vibration" (2003)
- "Come Back (Light Therapy)" (2004)
- "Winter in the Hamptons" (2005)
- "It's the Nighttime" (2005)
- "Julie (Come Out of the Rain)" (2013)
- "Some Days I'm Golden All Night" (2015)
- "Businessman" (2018)
- "Hollow Moon" (2022)

Downloads

- Kcrw.Com Presents... Josh Rouse Live With Guitar & Strings (2006)
- Live Shepherds Bush Empire December 7, 2007 (2008)
- KCRW Morning Becomes Eclectic April 20, 2006, Outtakes (2008)
- Valencia EP – Bedroom Classics (2009)
