= Jason Lehning =

American producer & composer (born 1972)

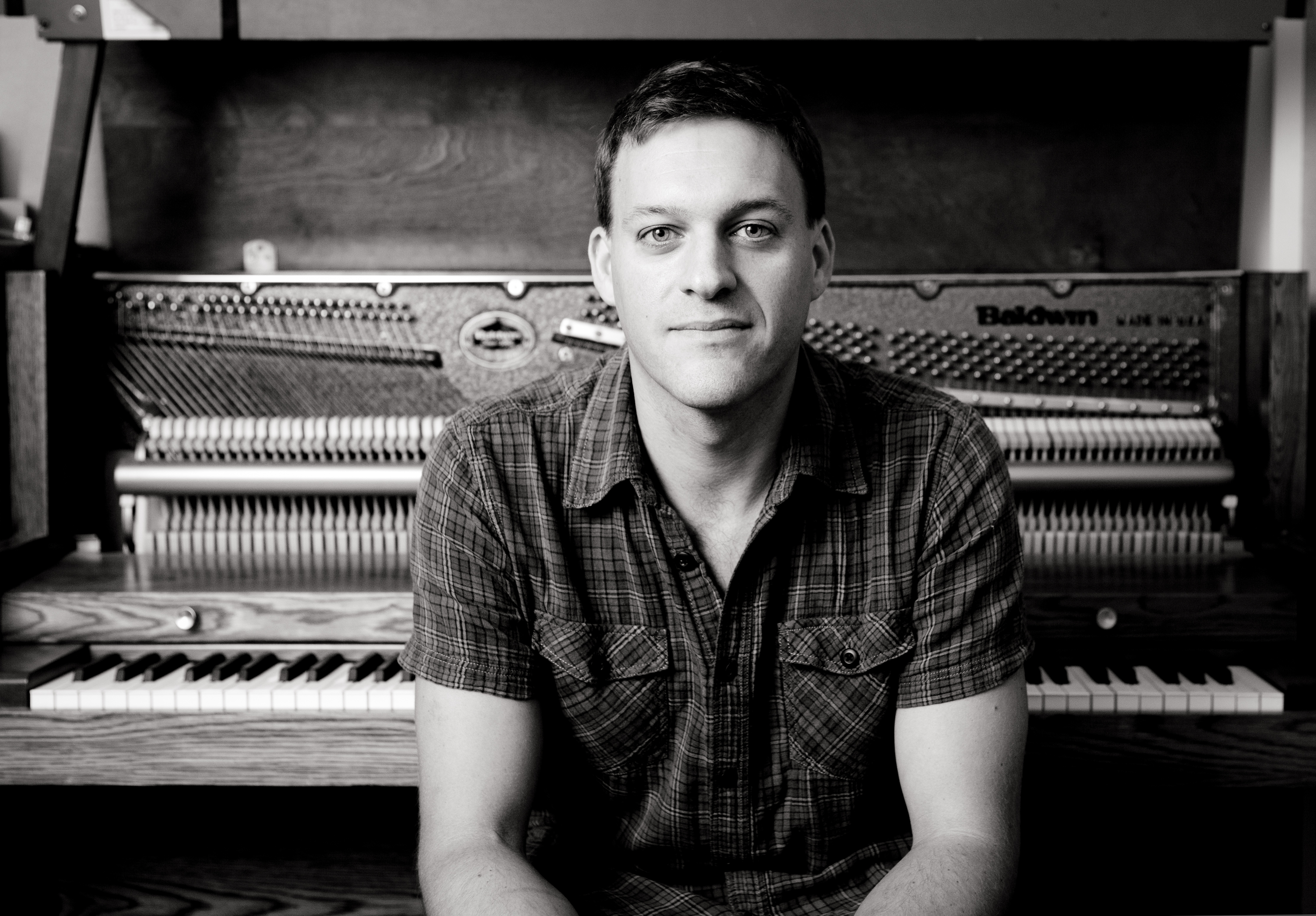

Background information
- Born: April 14, 1972 (age 54); Nashville, Tennessee, U.S.
- Genres: Rock; pop; alternative rock; Americana
- Instruments: Guitar; keyboards; bass
- Years active: 1990–present
- Website: jasonlehning.com

Jason Lehning (born April 14, 1972) is an American producer, composer, musician and mixer/engineer living in Nashville, Tennessee.

== Biography ==
=== Early life ===
Jason Lehning was born and raised in Nashville, Tennessee in a musical family. The son of producer Kyle Lehning, Jason was exposed to the recording process at an early age. After attending high school in Tennessee and graduating from Berklee College of Music in Boston, Lehning returned to Nashville to begin work as an engineer.

=== Production/writing career ===
Lehning's earliest work was as an assistant engineer in several Nashville studios. He was allowed access to studios on down-time to invite artists to record. His early demos with artist David Mead resulted in a record deal for the singer and Lehning's first major label job as a producer. Since then, Lehning has been active as a producer, musician, composer, mixer and engineer, contributing to over 350 albums. The diverse range of artists with whom he has worked includes George Jones, Erasure, Mat Kearney, Guster, Bill Frisell, and Alison Krauss. Lehning has won two Grammy awards as an engineer and was nominated for the Grammy Award for Best Engineered Album, Non-Classical in 2008 for II by Viktor Krauss.

=== Work with the Silver Seas ===
In 1999, Lehning formed the band The Bees with singer-songwriter Daniel Tashian and drummer David Gehrke. When they got a record deal, they were forced to change the name because a UK band had the same name. They tour regularly in the UK and have made several BBC Radio and TV appearances including Later... with Jools Holland. Their fourth album, Alaska, was released in 2013.
