= Kevin Sucher =

American record producer

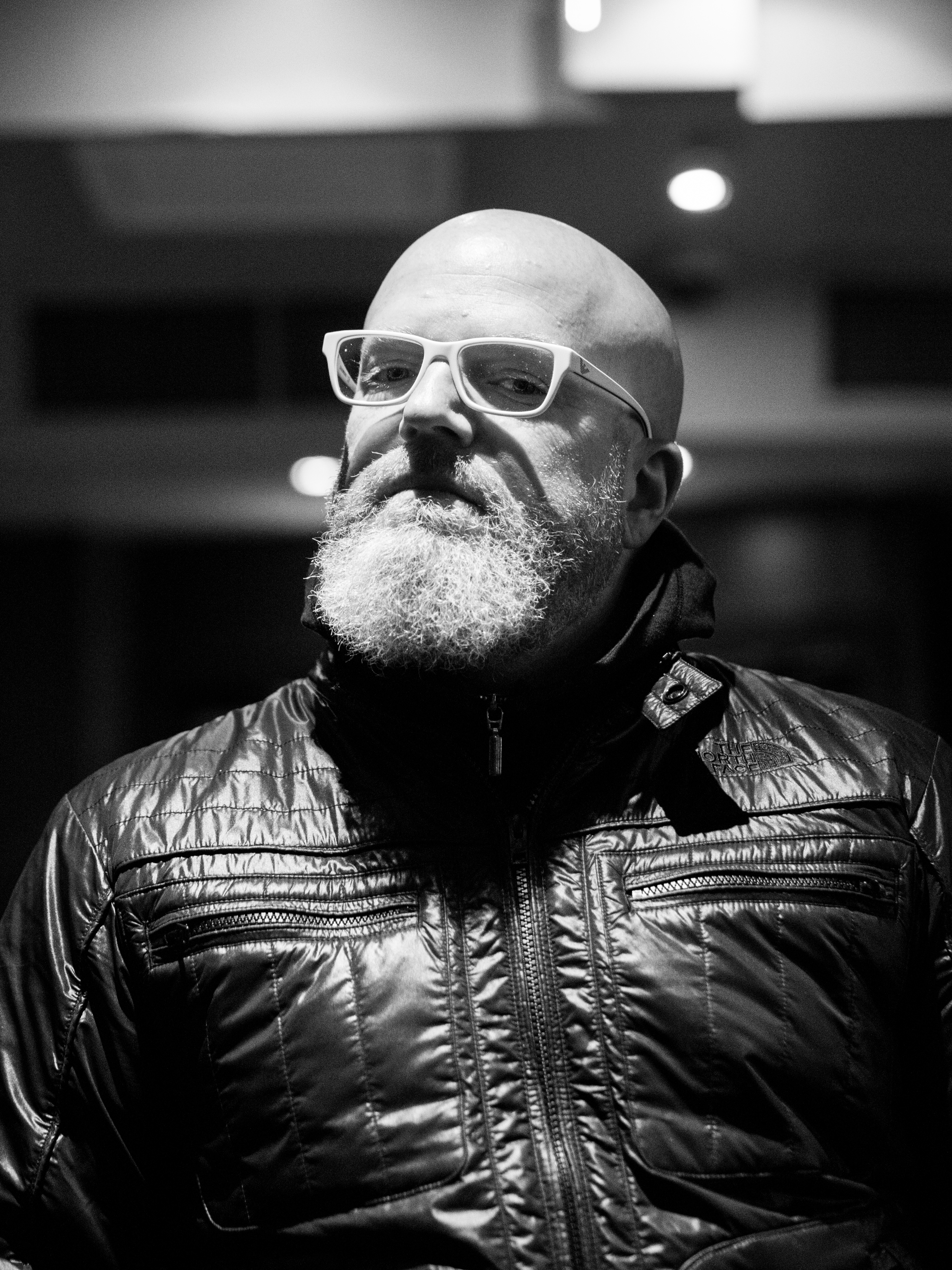
- Kevin Sucher, The Laboratory Recording Studio

Background information
- Occupation(s): Mix engineer, producer, Songwriter, Artist
- Instruments: keyboards; guitars

Kevin Sucher is an American record producer, recording engineer, mixer, and Artist who is best known for his work with Eric Benet and Diane Warren. In March 2020, Sucher was named the Executive Director of 88Nine Radio Milwaukee.

== Career ==
Sucher started his record-producing career in 1993. In the early 1990s, he opened his own recording studio, the Laboratory Recording Studio. In 2007, Sucher began working with Eric Benet. Sucher produced, engineered, and mixed several of the songs that were built into tracks on the album Love & Life. The album was nominated for Best R&B Album and Best Male Vocal R&B Performance at the 51st Annual Grammy Awards. Sucher worked on Benet's next album, Lost In Time. On that album, Sucher worked as engineer and mixer on Benet's "Sometimes I Cry", which was nominated for Best Traditional R&B Performance at the 54th Annual Grammy Awards in 2010. In 2012, Sucher engineered Benet's next album, entitled The One. In 2022, Sucher returned to the stage and opened a Las Vegas headlining residency with his band the Docksiders.

== Selected discography ==
- 2006: The Gufs – A Different Sea (producing, engineering, mixing)
- 2008: Eric Benet – Love & Life (engineering, mixing)
- 2009: Najee – Mind over Matter (engineering, mixing)
- 2010: Eric Benet – Lost in Time (production consultant, administration, sound consultant, engineer, instrumentation, keyboards, mixing)
- 2010: Bishop Darrell Hines – Darrell Hines Live (engineer)
- 2012: Eric Benet – The One (engineering, mixing, management)

== Credits ==
Sucher has produced or engineered works for the following artists:

- Eric Benet
- The Tenors
- Stevie Wonder
- Gwen Stefani
- Najee
- Train
- Michelle Branch
- Sheryl Crow
- Bishop Darrell Hines
- The Docksiders
- David Foster
- El DeBarge
- Fifth Harmony
- Little Mix
- DeAndre Brackensick
- Ruslan Sirota
- LeAnn Rimes
- Gloria Estefan
- Diane Warren
- Due Voci
- Toni Braxton
- Olivia Newton-John
- Tony Orlando
- The Gufs
