= Easier Said =

Easier Said may refer to:

- "Easier Said", a song by Goran Kralj from Any Day Now (2004)
- "Easier Said", a song by Prolyphic & Reanimator from The Ugly Truth (2008)
- "Easier Said", a song by Sunflower Bean (2016)
- "Easier Said", a song by Alessia Cara from The Pains of Growing (2018)
