= Goran Kralj =

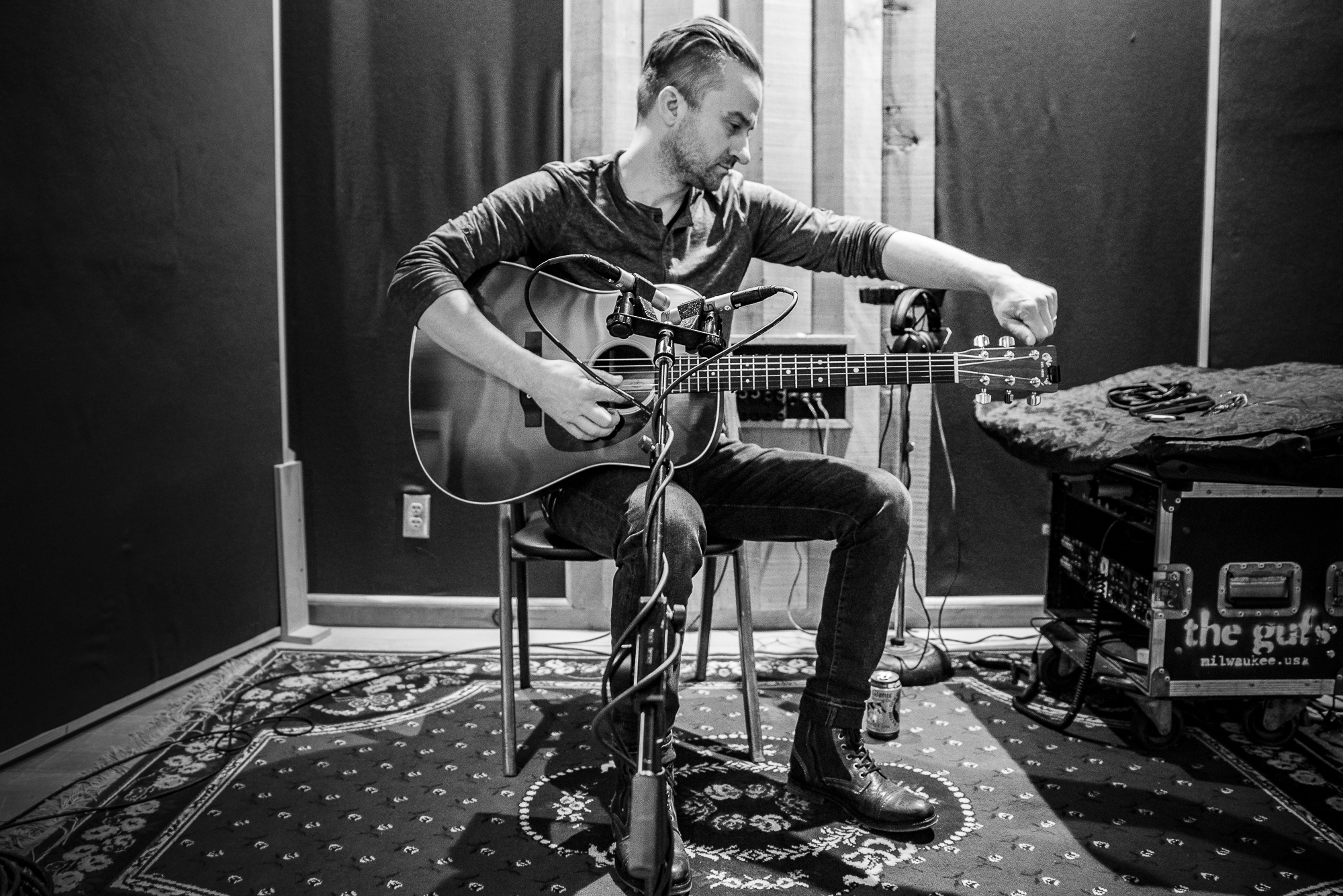
- Goran Kralj in Studio

Background information
- Genres: Rock, pop
- Years active: 1988–
- Label: Red Submarine Records
- Website: https://www.goransongs.com

Goran Kralj is the lead singer and songwriter for The Gufs, a Milwaukee pop-rock band active from 1988 to 1999. The group released their follow-up in 2006 after a seven-year hiatus. Goran and his brother Dejan are graduates of Munster High School in Munster, Indiana. Goran lives in Chicago area and works in the restorative/aesthetic dental industry.

== Discography ==
=== Singles ===
Goran released a single in memory of the victims of 9/11 called "Where Are You Now?" in late 2001.

He did vocals on the Guster album "Parachute." He also did vocals on the Pet Engine song "Strapped" off their album "Feeling Like a Hundred Bucks." He did arrangement on the Spanglemaker album "End of the Gray."

=== Solo albums ===
In 2004, he released a solo album named Any Day Now on Red Submarine Records.

In 2019, Goran released his second solo Album, Under a Nashville Sky, followed by Airports & Alibis in 2020.
