= Northern Room =

Background information
- Origin: Milwaukee, Wisconsin, USA
- Genres: Alternative rock, Indie rock, Rock
- Years active: 2005–2008, 2013
- Members: Andrew Jonathan; Michael Morgan; Micah Olla; Tony Olla
- Website: www.northernroom.com

Northern Room was a rock band from Milwaukee, Wisconsin, USA. In 2006, Northern Room were the winner, among over 100 bands, of a contest to open for Bon Jovi at the Bradley Center in Milwaukee. The band opened for The Gufs on the latter's reunion tour late in 2006. Early in 2007, the group released its second EP, Only Seconds. They were signed in Japan to BM3 Records in 2007. The group disbanded after Andrew Jonathan decided to leave the band. Northern Room had been working on new material before announcing their breakup and claimed that they may decide to release these unreleased songs by the end of 2008. However, only the single "Blacklight" was released in that time frame. Northern Room played their final show on November 8, 2008.

In January 2013, the band reunited to play a benefit for the Pablove Foundation.

== Band members ==
- Andrew Jonathan – Vocals, Guitar, Keys
- Michael Morgan – Drums, Keys
- Micah Olla – Bass, Keys
- Tony Olla – Guitar, Keys

== Discography ==
- Last Embrace - EP (February 28, 2006)
- Only Seconds - EP (April 26, 2007)
- Last Embrace - Deluxe Edition (November 2, 2007)
- Blacklight - Single (October 22, 2008)
- Never Will Forget You - Single (January 25, 2010)
