= Any Time Now =

Any Time Now may refer to:

- Any Time Now (O.A.R. album)
- Any Time Now (The Outfield album)
- Any Time Now (TV series), a 2002 Irish comedy-drama

== See also ==
- Any Day Now (disambiguation)
