= Songs of Life (The Gufs album) =

Studio album by The Gufs
- Released: 1992
- Genre: Alternative
- Length: 57:40
- Label: Red Submarine Records

The Gufs chronology
Staring Into The Sun (1990)	Songs of Life (1992)	Collide (1995)

Songs Of Life is the second studio album by the Milwaukee-based rock band The Gufs. It was released in 1992 and may be classified as alternative music.

== Track listing ==
All tracks by The Gufs

1. "Life's Sweet Sound" - 4:42
2. "Lay You Down" - 4:38
3. "For A Ride" - 5:29
4. "Everything" - 4:47
5. "Danielle" - 5:02
6. "Kiss The Sky" - 4:40
7. "My Copper Circus" - 1:49
8. "Song Of Life" - 4:17
9. "She Says" - 3:13
10. "The Chosen" - 5:19
11. "When Time Comes" - 4:47
12. "Lullaby" - 3:09
13. "Don't Look Away" - 4:31
14. "Blindfold Removed" - 1:01

== Personnel ==
- Goran Kralj - lead vocals
- Dejan Kralj - bass guitar
- Morgan Dawley - lead guitar, backup vocals
- Scott Schwebel - drums
