= Only Seconds =

EP by Northern Room
- Released: April 26, 2007
- Genre: Alternative rock Indie rock Rock

Northern Room chronology
Last Embrace (2006)	Only Seconds (2007)	Last Embrace - Deluxe Edition (2008)

Only Seconds is an EP album by the indie rock group Northern Room, released on April 26, 2007. All vocals are sung by Andrew Jonathan.

== Track listing ==
#	Track name	Length
1.	We're On Fire	3:34
2.	For All These Years	3:48
3.	Stars of God	4:30
4.	Waiting	3:30
