= Chidobe Awuzie =

American football player (born 1995)

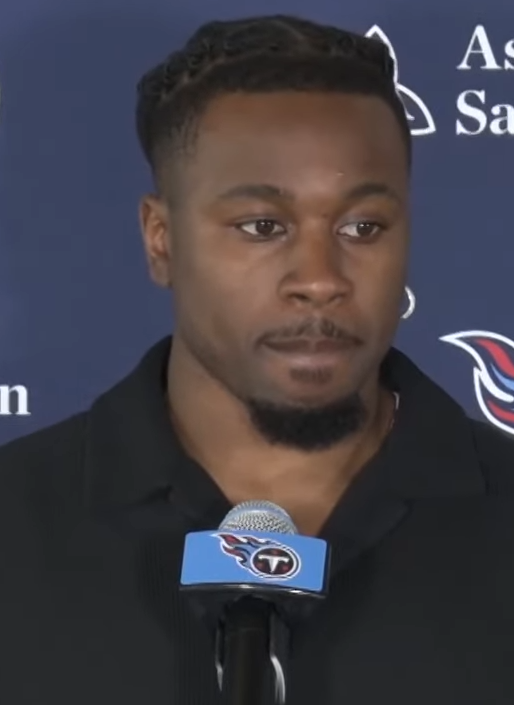
- Awuzie with the Tennessee Titans in 2024

No. 3 – Baltimore Ravens
- Position: Cornerback
- Roster status: Active

Personal information
- Born: May 24, 1995 (age 31); San Jose, California, U.S.
- Listed height: 6 ft 0 in (1.83 m)
- Listed weight: 202 lb (92 kg)

Career information
- High school: Oak Grove (San Jose)
- College: Colorado (2013–2016)
- NFL draft: 2017: 2nd round, 60th overall pick

Career history
- Dallas Cowboys (2017–2020); Cincinnati Bengals (2021–2023); Tennessee Titans (2024); Baltimore Ravens (2025–present)

Awards and highlights
- 2× Second-team All-Pac-12 (2015, 2016)

Career NFL statistics as of Week 5, 2026
- Total tackles: 445
- Forced fumbles: 5
- Fumble recoveries: 3
- Interceptions: 7
- Pass deflections: 74
- Stats at Pro Football Reference

Chidobe Chilorio Richard Awuzie (born May 24, 1995) is an American professional football cornerback for the Baltimore Ravens of the National Football League (NFL). He played college football for the Colorado Buffaloes and was selected by the Dallas Cowboys in the second round of the 2017 NFL draft. He also played for the Cincinnati Bengals and Tennessee Titans.

== Early life ==
The son of Nigerian immigrants, Awuzie attended Oak Grove High School in San Jose, California. He played cornerback as well as wide receiver and was rated as a three-star recruit by both Rivals.com and ESPN.com.

As a junior, he tallied 23 carries for 249 yards, 3 touchdowns, 13 receptions for 211 yards and 4 touchdowns. As a free safety, he had 58 tackles, one interception returned 80 yards for a touchdown, one fumble recovery and 5 blocked kicks. He received All-League honors.

As a senior, he had 138 carries for 1,285 yards (third on the league), a 9.3-yard average and 14 touchdowns (first on the league), posting six 100-yard and two 200-yard games. He also had 18 receptions for 487 yards (two 100-yard games), 7 touchdowns, one pass completion for 38 yards and 128 total points (first on the league). On defense he played cornerback, making 69 tackles (3 for loss), 4 interceptions (2 returned for touchdowns), 12 passes defensed, 2 forced fumbles and 4 blocked kicks. He received All-League, PrepStar All-West Region, first-team All-Area and helped his team claim back-to-back BVAL Mount Hamilton Division titles.

He practiced basketball and track. He had career bests of 21.7 in the 200 metres and 22–1 in the long jump.

He committed to play college football for the University of Colorado Boulder, over offers from other Power 5 schools including Pac-12 opponents Utah and Washington State.

== College career ==
Awuzie gained immediate playing time, appearing in 12 games, with 7 starts (six at the nickel position and one at left cornerback). He recorded 643 snaps on defense (third-most by a freshman in school history), 59 tackles (just the 13th freshman to record 50 or more tackles for a season), 5 tackles for loss, one quarterback sack, 4 passes defensed, 2 forced fumbles and a fumble recovery. He had 12 tackles against the University of Arizona.

As a sophomore, he started in the first 9 games, before missing last three with a lacerated kidney he suffered in practice. He tallied 64 tackles (2 for loss), 8 passes defensed (third on the team), 2 interceptions, one fumble recovery and one quarterback hurry.

As a junior, he appeared in 13 games (12 starts) at a combination between cornerback and the nickel position. He registered 90 tackles (second on the team), 78 solo tackles, 4 sacks (set record for the most by a CU defensive back), 2 interceptions, 10 passes defensed and had a team-high 13 tackles for loss, making it the first time a defensive back ever led in that category dating back to 1969 (when it was first tracked). He was named to the All-Pac-12 football team second-team.

Before his senior season, he was named to the Thorpe Award watchlist, annually given to best defensive back in the nation, as well as the Nagurski Award watchlist, which is given to the best defensive player in college football. He finished with 60 tackles (48 solo), 4 sacks (tying his own single-season record for CU defensive backs), one interception, 12 passes defensed and 2 forced fumbles.

== Professional career ==
=== Pre-draft ===
He attended the NFL Combine and completed all combine and positional drills. He also participated at Colorado's Pro Day along with Ahkello Witherspoon, Tedric Thompson, Sefo Liufau, and ten other teammates. He opted to only perform positional drills and had another attempt at the vertical jump for the 44 scouts and representatives from all 32 NFL teams. He had private workouts and pre-draft visits with the Dallas Cowboys, Philadelphia Eagles, Oakland Raiders, and Tennessee Titans. NFL draft experts and analysts projected him to be a first or second round pick in the 2017 NFL Draft. He was ranked the fourth best cornerback in the draft by DraftScout.com, the second best nickel back by NFL analyst Mike Mayock, the seventh best cornerback by ESPN, and was ranked the 15th best cornerback by Sports Illustrated.

Pre-draft measurables
Height	Weight	Arm length	Hand span	Wingspan	40-yard dash	10-yard split	20-yard split	20-yard shuttle	Three-cone drill	Vertical jump	Broad jump	Bench press	Wonderlic
5 ft 11 7/8 in (1.83 m)	202 lb (92 kg)	30 5/8 in (0.78 m)	8 1/2 in (0.22 m)	6 ft 2 1/8 in (1.88 m)	4.43 s	1.50 s	2.57 s	4.14 s	6.81 s	39.5 in (1.00 m)	11 ft 0 in (3.35 m)	16 reps	34
All values from NFL Combine/Pro Day

=== Dallas Cowboys ===
The Cowboys selected Awuzie in the second round (60th overall) of the 2017 NFL draft. Awuzie was the 10th cornerback drafted in 2017. His selection is remembered by the intense speech that Drew Pearson gave amidst boos from the Philadelphia Eagles fans in attendance. He was the first of three cornerbacks the Cowboys drafted in 2017. The Cowboys drafted Jourdan Lewis in the third round (92nd overall) and Marquez White in the sixth round (216th overall).

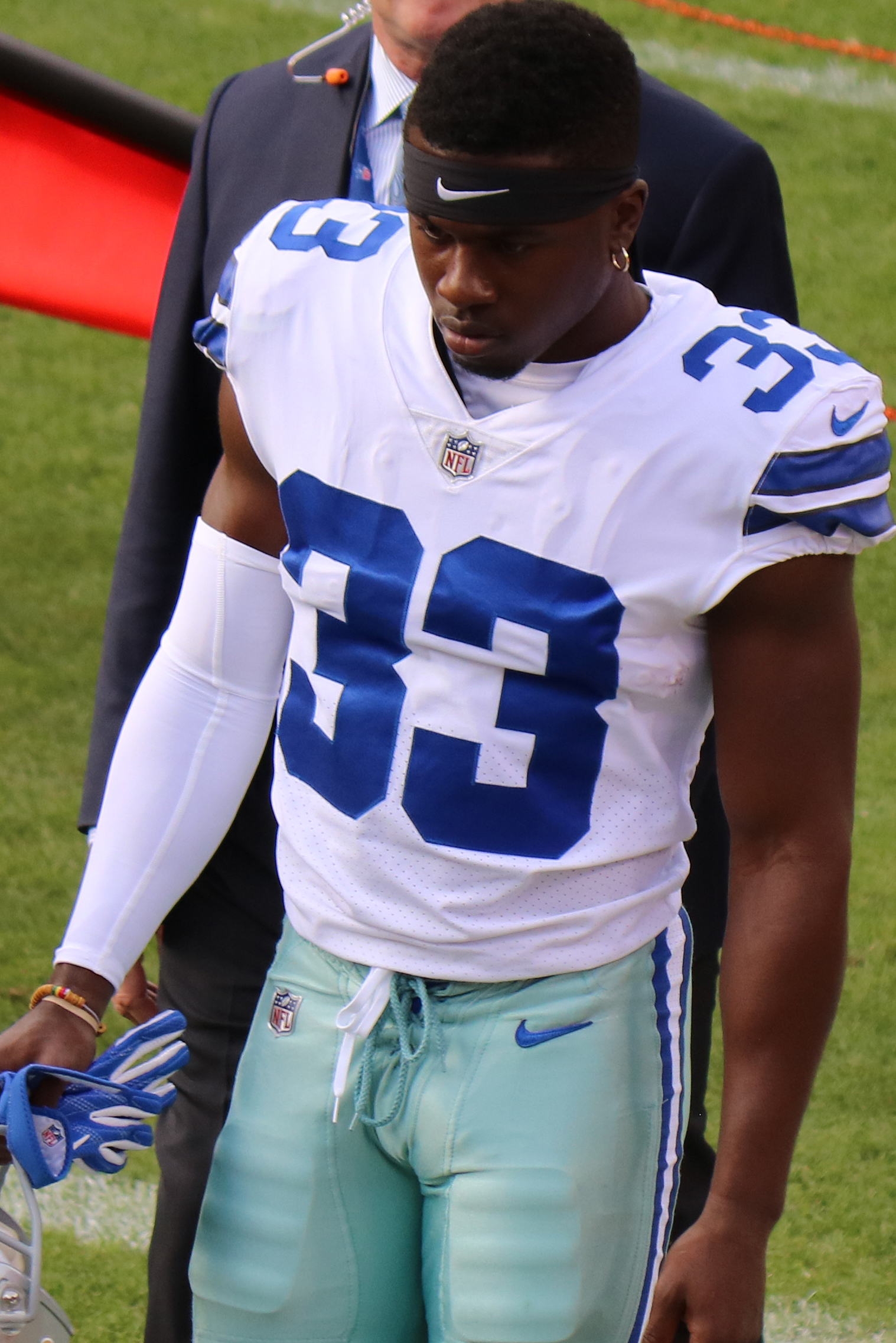
Awuzie with the Dallas Cowboys in 2017

==== 2017 ====
On May 11, 2017, the Dallas Cowboys signed Awuzie to a four–year, $4.28 million contract that includes a signing bonus of $1.25 million.

Throughout training camp, Awuzie competed to be a starting cornerback against Jourdan Lewis, Marquez White, Nolan Carroll, Orlando Scandrick, and Anthony Brown. He missed most of training camp with a hamstring and ankle injury. Head coach Jason Garrett named him a backup and listed him as the fourth cornerback on the depth chart to begin the season, behind Nolan Carroll, Orlando Scandrick, and Anthony Brown.

He made his professional regular season debut in the Cowboys' season-opener against the New York Giants and made four combined tackles during a 19–3 victory. On September 17, 2017, Awuzie earned his first career start after Orlando Scandrick sustained a fractured hand the following week. Unfortunately, Awuzie sustained a hamstring injury during the Cowboys' 42–17 loss at the Denver Broncos. Awuzie was inactive for the next two games (Weeks 3–4) due to the injury. He returned during the Cowboys' Week 5 loss against the Green Bay Packers, but further re-injured his hamstring and was subsequently sidelined for the next four games (Week 7–10). Awuzie supplanted Anthony Brown as a starting cornerback for the last five games due to consistent penalties. In Week 15, he collected a season-high five combined tackles and one pass deflection during a 20–17 victory at the Raiders. On December 31, 2017, Awuzie recorded two solo tackles, deflected a pass, and made his first career interception during a 6–0 victory at the Eagles in Week 17. Awuzie intercepted a pass by Eagles' quarterback Nick Foles, that was initially intended for wide receiver Alshon Jeffery, during the first quarter.

He finished his rookie season with 25 combined tackles (14 solo), seven pass deflections, one interception, and one forced fumble in ten games and six starts.

==== 2018 ====
He entered training camp slated as the No. 2 starting cornerback under defensive coordinator Rod Marinelli. Head coach Jason Garrett named Awuzie and Byron Jones the starting cornerbacks to begin the season. In Week 2, he collected a season-high eight solo tackles during a 20–13 win against the Giants. He was inactive during a Week 6 win against the Jacksonville Jaguars due to an ankle injury.

Awuzie finished the season with 71 combined tackles (57 solo), 11 pass deflections, one interception, and one forced fumble in 15 games and 14 starts. He received an overall grade of 65.1 from Pro Football Focus, which ranked 65th among all qualifying cornerbacks in 2018. He contributed to the team ranking sixth in the league in scoring defense (20.3 ppg) and No. 7 in both total defense (329.3 ypg) and red zone touchdown efficiency (51.0%).

The Cowboys finished first in the NFC East with a 10–6 record and earned a playoff berth. On January 5, 2019, Awuzie started his first career playoff game and made six combined tackles and broke up a pass attempt during a 24–22 win against the Seattle Seahawks during a NFC Wildcard Game.

==== 2019 ====
In Week 3 against the Miami Dolphins, he had 8 tackles (5 solo) and 2 passes defensed. In Week 4 against the New Orleans Saints, Awuzie made an acrobatic interception off a pass from Teddy Bridgewater in the 12–10 loss.

He started all 16 games, recording a career-high 79 tackles (one for loss), 14 passes defensed and one fumble recovery. He contributed to the team ranking second in the league in third-down efficiency (33.3%), ninth in total defense (327.0 ypg) and tenth in passing defense (223.5 ypg).

==== 2020 ====
In Week 1 against the Los Angeles Rams, Awuzie recorded his first interception of the season off pass thrown by Jared Goff during the 20–17 loss. He was placed on injured reserve on September 26, 2020, with a hamstring injury. He was activated on November 10, 2020.

He was placed on the reserve/COVID-19 list by the team on December 10, 2020, and activated on December 16. He appeared in 8 games (six starts), making 38 tackles (29 solo), one interception and one fumble recovery.

=== Cincinnati Bengals ===
On March 19, 2021, the Cincinnati Bengals signed Awuzie to a three–year, $21.75 million contract that includes $7.50 million guaranteed and a signing bonus of $4.50 million.

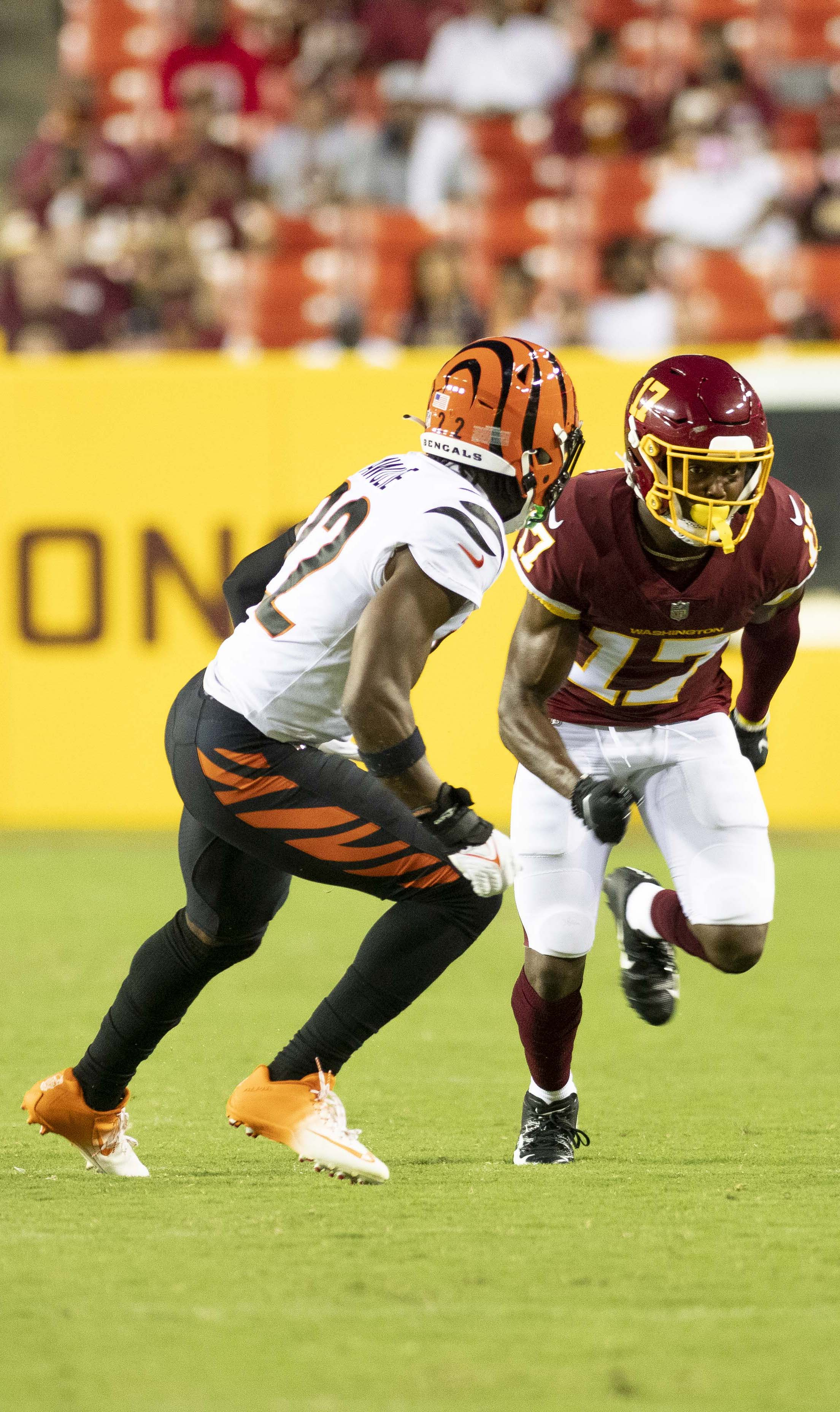
Awuzie covering Terry McLaurin

Awuzie was named a starting cornerback alongside Trae Waynes, and would play in fourteen of seventeen games for the Bengals. In Week 5 against the Packers, he would pick off quarterback Aaron Rodgers, and return it for 42–yards, a career long interception return for Awuzie. He would get another interception on Justin Herbert in Week 12 against the Los Angeles Chargers. While playing the Kansas City Chiefs in Week 17, Awuzie would record a career-high 10 solo tackles in one game. He finished the regular season with 14 starts, 64 tackles (4 for loss), two interceptions and 14 passes defended (led the team). He contributed to the team ranking second in the league in fourth-down conversions (38.9%) and goalto-go conversions (59.3%).

In Super Bowl LVI, Awuzie recorded his first career playoff interception off Rams' quarterback Matthew Stafford at the beginning of the third quarter.

==== 2022 ====
While playing in Week 8 against the Cleveland Browns, Awuzie suffered a torn ACL while defending a pass against Browns' receiver Amari Cooper, ending his season. He played in eight games, recording 35 tackles, 5 passes defended and one forced fumble, while helping the team rank fifth in the league in scoring defense (20.1 ppg).

==== 2023 ====
Fully recovered from his injury, Awuzie was named a starting cornerback for the Bengals with Cam Taylor-Britt. In Week 1 against the Browns, Awuzie recovered a fumble made by running back Jerome Ford. Awuzie would injure his back during a practice session on October 5, 2023, leading to him sitting out the Bengals 34–20 win against the Arizona Cardinals in Week 5. Awuzie was diagnosed with a herniated disc, and would play through the injury during the Bengals' Week 6 contest against the Seahawks; Awuzie was pulled from the game in the second quarter after his back locked up while defending a deep pass against Seahawks receiver Tyler Lockett. Awuzie would be limited on a snap count for the following weeks, before losing the starting cornerback job to rookie DJ Turner.

After an injury to Taylor-Britt during practice, Awuzie returned to the starting lineup ahead of Bengals' Week 11 game against the Pittsburgh Steelers. Taylor-Britt was moved to injured reserve on December 4, 2023, keeping Awuzie in the starting spot. He appeared in 15 games (10 starts), collecting 57 tackles (2 for loss), 6 passes defensed, one forced fumble and one fumble recovery.

=== Tennessee Titans ===
==== 2024 ====
On March 14, 2024, the Tennessee Titans signed Awuzie to a three–year, $36.00 million contract that includes $22.98 million guaranteed, $19.00 million guaranteed upon signing, and an initial signing bonus of $7.50 million.

He was named a starting cornerback to begin the season alongside L'Jarius Sneed. He played the first three games of the season, recording four tackles, but suffered a groin injury early in Week 3's match against the Green Bay Packers. On September 27, Awuzie was placed on injured reserve. After ten weeks, Awuzie was activated on December 7 and returned for Week 14's loss against the Jacksonville Jaguars, catching his first interception with the Titans and making three tackles. He appeared in 8 games with 7 starts and missed 9 games with a groin injury, helping the team rank second in the league in both total defense (311.2 ypg) and pass defense (177.3 ypg). He registered 26 tackles (17 solo), one interception, 4 passes defensed and one forced fumble

On March 15, 2025, the Titans released Awuzie in a salary-cap move.

=== Baltimore Ravens ===
==== 2025 ====
On March 25, 2025, the Baltimore Ravens signed Awuzie to a one–year, $1.25 million contract. He made 14 appearances (including five starts) for Baltimore, recording 43 tackles and seven passes defended as the Ravens' No. 3 cornerback.

==== 2026 ====
On March 12, 2026, Awuzie re-signed with the Ravens on a one-year, $5 million contract.

== NFL career statistics ==
Legend
**Bold**	Career high

=== Regular season ===
Year	Team	Games		Tackles					Interceptions					Fumbles				
Year	Team	GP	GS	Comb	Solo	Ast	Sck	TFL	PD	Int	Yds	Avg	TD	FF	FR	Yds	Avg	TD
2017	DAL	10	6	25	14	11	0.0	0	7	1	0	0.0	0	**1**	0	0	0.0	0
2018	DAL	15	14	71	**57**	14	0.0	0	11	1	0	0.0	0	**1**	0	0	0.0	0
2019	DAL	**16**	**16**	**79**	48	**31**	0.0	1	**14**	1	0	0.0	0	0	**1**	0	0.0	0
2020	DAL	8	6	38	29	9	0.0	0	5	1	0	0.0	0	0	**1**	0	0.0	0
2021	CIN	14	14	64	53	11	0.0	**4**	**14**	**2**	**42**	**21.0**	0	0	0	0	0.0	0
2022	CIN	8	8	35	29	6	0.0	0	5	0	0	0.0	0	**1**	0	0	0.0	0
2023	CIN	15	10	57	43	14	0.0	2	6	0	0	0.0	0	**1**	**1**	0	0.0	0
2024	TEN	8	3	26	17	9	0.0	0	4	1	8	8.0	0	**1**	0	0	0.0	0
2025	BAL	14	5	43	29	14	0.0	0	7	0	0	0.0	0	0	0	0	0.0	0
2026	BAL	5	0	7	5	2	0.0	0	1	0	0	0.0	0	0	0	0	0.0	0
Career		113	86	445	324	121	0.0	7	74	7	50	7.1	0	5	3	0	0.0	0

=== Postseason ===
Year	Team	Games		Tackles					Interceptions					Fumbles				
Year	Team	GP	GS	Comb	Solo	Ast	Sck	TFL	PD	Int	Yds	Avg	TD	FF	FR	Yds	Avg	TD
2018	DAL	2	2	12	11	1	0.0	0	**2**	0	0	0.0	0	0	0	0	0.0	0
2021	CIN	**4**	**4**	**24**	**16**	**8**	0.0	0	1	**1**	**1**	**1.0**	0	0	0	0	0.0	0
Career		6	6	36	27	9	0.0	0	3	1	1	1.0	0	0	0	0	0.0	0

== Personal life ==
Awuzie is a Christian. Awuzie has said, "My faith is everything. A testament to God always and His grace and mercy in my life, I'm a living testimony of that. In everything I do, I treat football like a platform to open eyes to the faith of Christianity and accepting Jesus Christ as our Savior."

Awuzie is an avid chess player who commonly plays 1. e4 and plays on Chess.com. He has compared his chess game to his play on the football field as a cornerback, comparing himself to a fianchettoed bishop. He also says chess helps him in his daily life and in making connections with others. In July 2022, he won Chess.com's BlitzChamps tournament, a rapid tournament for NFL players, beating former Cowboys teammate Amari Cooper in the final. He finished as runner-up the following year to Chiefs linebacker Drue Tranquill.
