= Collide Sessions =

Studio album by The Gufs
- Released: 1997
- Genre: Alternative
- Label: Red Submarine Records

The Gufs chronology
The Gufs (1996)	Collide Sessions (1997)	Holiday From You (1999)

Collide is the fifth studio album by the Milwaukee-based rock band The Gufs.

== Track listing ==
All tracks by The Gufs

1. "Belong"
2. "Someday Daughter"
3. "Wearing Thin"
4. "Waiting"
5. "Emily"
6. "For a Ride" (acoustic)
7. "Forever and a Day"
8. "Track"

== Personnel ==
- Goran Kralj – lead vocals
- Dejan Kralj – bass guitar
- Morgan Dawley – lead guitar, backup vocals
- Scott Schwebel – drums
- Brian Pettit – percussion
