= A Different Sea =

Studio album by The Gufs
- Released: 2006
- Genre: Alternative rock
- Length: 39:41
- Label: Red Submarine
- Producer: Kevin Sucher

The Gufs chronology
Holiday From You (1997)	A Different Sea (2006)

Professional ratings
Review scores
Source	Rating
Melodic.net	link

A Different Sea is a studio album by The Gufs, released seven years after their last album, Holiday From You. The album features string arrangements from the Milwaukee Symphony.

== Track listing ==
Source: CDFreedom.com

All tracks are written by The Gufs.

No.	Title	Length
1.	"Beautiful Disaster"	3:49
2.	"Extraordinary"	3:38
3.	"Tell Me Now"	3:36
4.	"Stars"	3:52
5.	"Free"	3:43
6.	"Someone Like You"	4:15
7.	"Leave This Life"	4:35
8.	"All Over Again"	3:55
9.	"Lifetime"	4:15
10.	"Where Do I Go From Here"	4:03

== Personnel ==
- Goran Kralj – lead vocals, guitar, piano
- Dejan Kralj – bass guitar
- Morgan Dawley – lead guitar, backup vocals
- Scott Schwebel – drums, percussion
