= Circa 89 =

Studio album by The Gufs
- Released: 1993
- Genre: Alternative
- Length: 52:55
- Label: Red Submarine Records

Circa 89 is a Live recording by the Milwaukee-based rock band The Gufs.

== Track listing ==
All tracks by The Gufs

1. "Tell The Man Upstairs" - 3:46
2. "Burning Down The Wall" - 4:08
3. "Love Falls Down" - 4:23
4. "Into Nothing" - 4:00
5. "Out Of Mind" - 6:12
6. "On Your Cross" - 4:31
7. "Contradictions" - 5:52
8. "Brighter Every Day" - 2:59
9. "Tomorrow Child" - 5:38
10. "World of Stone" - 3:18
11. "Until The End" - 5:09
12. "Aryana" - 3:03

== Personnel ==
- Goran Kralj - lead vocals
- Dejan Kralj - bass guitar
- Morgan Dawley - lead guitar, backup vocals
- Scott Schwebel - drums
