= Any Day Now =

Any Day Now may refer to:

== Film and television ==
- Any Day Now (1976 film) (Dutch: Vandaag of morgen), a science fiction film
- Any Day Now (2012 film), a film starring Alan Cumming
- Any Day Now (2020 film) (Finnish: Ensilumi), a drama film
- Any Day Now (2025 film), a crime comedy film
- Any Day Now (TV series), a 1998-2002 American drama series

== Music ==
- "Any Day Now" (Burt Bacharach song), a 1962 song written by Burt Bacharach and Bob Hilliard, recorded by several artists
- "Any Day Now" (The Watchmen song)
- Any Day Now (The Archers album)
- Any Day Now (Goran Kralj album)
- Any Day Now (Joan Baez album)
- Any Day Now (The Legendary Pink Dots album)
- Any Day Now (Scott Walker album)
- Any Day Now (EP), an EP by Riddlin' Kids
- Any Day Now, an album by Chuck Jackson, including a version of the 1962 song
- The Any Day Now EP, by Elbow
  - "Any Day Now", a song from the EP and from the album Asleep in the Back
- "Any Day Now", a 2021 song by Bo Burnham from the special Bo Burnham: Inside

== See also ==
- "I Shall Be Released", a 1967 song by Bob Dylan whose chorus includes the words "Any day now"
