= Pet Engine =

American alternative power pop band

Pet Engine was an alternative/power-pop band that formed in Milwaukee, Wisconsin, in the early 1990s under the name "Blackfish" until a Florida-based "Blackfish" achieved success and forced a name change. Although they never achieved widespread commercial success, Pet Engine did release three albums and one EP on its label, Don't Records. The singles "Place to Breathe", "Reinventing the Wheel" and "Popular Teenage Disease" achieved a moderate amount of radio play in several American radio markets. The band was included on the Aware Records compilation volume 8 which also featured up-and-coming artists John Mayer and Howie Day.

Pet Engine's last official performance before a series of reunions came at Summerfest playing with Fountains of Wayne and Wilco. The band often played with popular Milwaukee bands such as Citizen King and The Gufs, and were a regular act at Milwaukee's Summerfest for several years. Although Pet Engine broke up in early 2003, they were briefly reunited when they played at Summerfest 2006.

== Discography ==
- Hearts And Bones And Voices (1994)
- Musicalbum EP (1995)
- Feeling Like a Hundred Bucks (Don't Records, 1997)
- Megahurtz (Don't Records, 2000)

== Compilations ==
- Uncharted - 1991 (as "Blackfish")
- Son of Uncharted - 1993 (as "Blackfish")
- Made In Wisconsin - 1997
- Gag Me With A Spoon - 1994
- Aware Records The Compilation Vol. 8- 2000

== Members ==
- Steve Ziel - Vocals/Guitar
- Clem Blanding - Bass
- Al Hildebrand - Guitar
- Micah Havertape - Drums

== Past members ==
Dan Andera - Drums (1993-1996) Matt Schroeder - Guitar (1990-1994) Dan Schroeder - Drums (1990 - 1992) Al H - guitar 1995-2004 Steve Ziel - lead singer,guitar - 1990 - 2004 Chris Blanding- bass 1993- 2004
