= Marcus Reese =

American football player (born 1981)

No. 52
- Position: Linebacker

Personal information
- Born: June 15, 1981 (age 45); San Jose, California, U.S.
- Listed height: 6 ft 1 in (1.85 m)
- Listed weight: 233 lb (106 kg)

Career information
- High school: Oak Grove (San Jose)
- College: UCLA (1999–2002)
- NFL draft: 2003: undrafted

Career history
- San Francisco 49ers (2003)*; Chicago Bears (2003–2005)
- * Offseason or practice squad member only

Awards and highlights
- Second-team All-Pac-10 (2002)
- Stats at Pro Football Reference

Marcus Reese (born June 15, 1981) is an American former professional football player who was a linebacker for the Chicago Bears of the National Football League (NFL) in 2004.

Reese played high school football at Oak Grove High School in San Jose, California, and college football for the UCLA Bruins.
