= Holiday from You =

Holiday From You

Studio album by The Gufs
- Released: 1999
- Genre: Alternative
- Length: 50:47
- Label: Atlantic
- Producer: Arnold Lanni; The Gufs

The Gufs chronology
Collide Sessions (1997)	Holiday From You (1999)	A Different Sea (2006)

Professional ratings
Review scores
Source	Rating
Melodic.net	4.5/5 stars

Holiday From You is the second major label release by the Milwaukee-based rock band The Gufs. The album peaked at #33 on the Billboard magazine Top Heatseekers chart. Holiday From You was re-released on Red Submarine Records, with some alternate tracks and revamped artwork, in 2006. The track "Give Back Yourself" features vocals by Rob Thomas. The 2006 reissued version features the Don Gilmore remixes of "Last Goodbye" and "Give Back Yourself".

== Track listing ==
All tracks by The Gufs

1. "Last Goodbye" – 3:52
2. "Surrounded" – 3:25
3. "Happily Ever After" – 4:08
4. "Lake 17" – 3:19
5. "Dumb" – 4:21
6. "Stuck" – 3:22
7. "Give Back Yourself" – 4:24
8. "Somewhere Out There" – 4:06
9. "Mistake" – 4:21
10. "Dead & Gone" – 3:21
11. "All I Want To Be" – 5:02
12. "Ashes" – 6:47

Re-Issue Bonus Track

1. "Forever Fallin" – 4:05

== Personnel ==
- Goran Kralj – lead vocals, guitar
- Dejan Kralj – bass guitar
- Morgan Dawley – lead guitar, backup vocals
- Scott Schwebel – drums, percussion
