= Allen Chapman (American football) =

American football player (born 1991)

No. 21, 24, 3
- Position: Cornerback

Personal information
- Born: July 23, 1991 (age 35); San Francisco, California, U.S.
- Listed height: 5 ft 11 in (1.80 m)
- Listed weight: 185 lb (84 kg)

Career information
- High school: Oak Grove (San Jose, California)
- College: City College of San Francisco; Kansas State
- NFL draft: 2013: undrafted

Career history
- Indianapolis Colts (2013)*; Arizona Rattlers (2014–2015); New Orleans VooDoo (2015)*; Portland Thunder (2015); Arizona Rattlers (2016–2017); Tampa Bay Storm (2017); Arizona Rattlers (2018–2021)
- * Offseason or practice squad member only

Awards and highlights
- ArenaBowl champion (2014); United Bowl champion (2017); 2× First-team All-IFL (2017, 2019)

Career AFL statistics
- Total tackles: 91.5
- Pass deflections: 17
- Interceptions: 7
- Stats at ArenaFan.com

Allen Chapman (born July 23, 1991) is an American former football cornerback. He was signed as an undrafted free agent by the Indianapolis Colts in 2013 after playing college football at Kansas State.

== Early life ==
Chapman attended Oak Grove High School in San Jose, California, where he played football and basketball. He was a two-time first-team All-Blossom Valley Athletic League Mt. Hamilton Division honoree and was the 2008 Most Valuable DB. As a senior, Chapman recorded 34 tackles, three interceptions, four passes defended and a forced fumble. He also rushed for 332 yards and eight touchdowns.

== College career ==
=== Community college ===
Chapman was not offered any scholarships after graduating from high school, so he decided to stay close to home and attend the City College of San Francisco (CCSF) to play for the Rams. In two seasons at CCSF, he compiled 39 tackles, 15 interceptions, two fumble recoveries, a sack, and three touchdowns. With the help of future Wildcats teammate Nigel Malone, he led his team to a 12–1 record and a NorCal Championship in 2010. They eventually lost in the state championship to Mt. San Antonio College.

Chapman drew interest from several NCAA Division I schools. He was rated as a three-star recruit by both Rivals.com and 247Sports. He accepted a scholarship from Kansas State over other offers from New Mexico, New Mexico State, and Tulsa in order to play for head coach Bill Snyder.

=== Kansas State ===
As a junior in 2011, Chapman registered 50 tackles, five passes defended, a forced fumble and an interception. He returned that interception 60 yards for a touchdown on November 5 against #3 Oklahoma State, but they went on to lose 52–45. His playing time increased as a senior in 2012, and he recorded career highs in tackles (57), interceptions (6) and passes defended (10). On November 3, he tied the Big 12 Conference single-game record by making three interceptions – including one he returned 29 yards for a touchdown – in a 44–30 win over Oklahoma State. He earned FBS Defensive Player of the Week and Big 12 Defensive Player of the Week honors for his performance.

== Professional career ==
=== Indianapolis Colts ===
After going unselected in the 2013 NFL draft, Chapman was signed by the Indianapolis Colts as an undrafted free agent on May 12, 2013, after participating in rookie camp as a tryout player. Coincidentally, the Colts released Nigel Malone (who played with Chapman at CC of San Francisco and Kansas State) in order to make space for the rookie cornerback. Chapman was waived on August 25.

=== Arizona Rattlers (first stint) ===
On November 1, 2013, Chapman were assigned to the Arizona Rattlers of the Arena Football League (AFL). He played his first game on April 26, 2014, tallying four combined tackles in a 69–59 victory over the San Antonio Talons. Chapman recorded his first career interception on June 6, picking off a pass thrown by Danny Southwick and returning it 21 yards for a touchdown with 50 seconds left in a 70–59 victory against the Portland Thunder. He recorded two more interceptions that season, both of which he returned for touchdowns. Chapman finished his rookie season with 51 tackles and three interceptions in 14 total games, including eight starts. He helped the Rattlers advance to ArenaBowl XXVII, where they defeated the Cleveland Gladiators by a score of 72–32.

=== New Orleans VooDoo ===
On March 23, 2015, Chapman was traded to the New Orleans VooDoo, along with Rayshaun Kizer, in exchange for future considerations.

=== Portland Thunder ===
On March 30, 2015, Chapman was traded to the Portland Thunder for claim order positioning. He appeared in two games for the Thunder, tallying 11 tackles and an interception. Chapman suffered a toe injury in a game against the Arizona Rattlers and was later placed on inactive reserve on May 11. He was moved to injured reserve on June 3, and placed on reassignment on July 8.

=== Arizona Rattlers (second stint) ===
On November 9, 2015, Chapman was assigned to the Arizona Rattlers. On January 19, 2017, he re-signed with the Rattlers. Chapman was named first-team All-Indoor Football League (IFL) in 2017. On July 8, 2017, the Rattlers defeated the Sioux Falls Storm in the United Bowl by a score of 50–41.

=== Tampa Bay Storm ===
On July 31, 2017, Chapman was assigned to the AFL's Tampa Bay Storm. The Storm folded in December 2017.

=== Arizona Rattlers (third stint) ===
Chapman re-signed with the Rattlers on September 12, 2017. He was named first-team All-IFL for the second time in 2019. He re-signed with the Rattlers for the 2021 season.
