= Oak Grove High School (San Jose, California) =

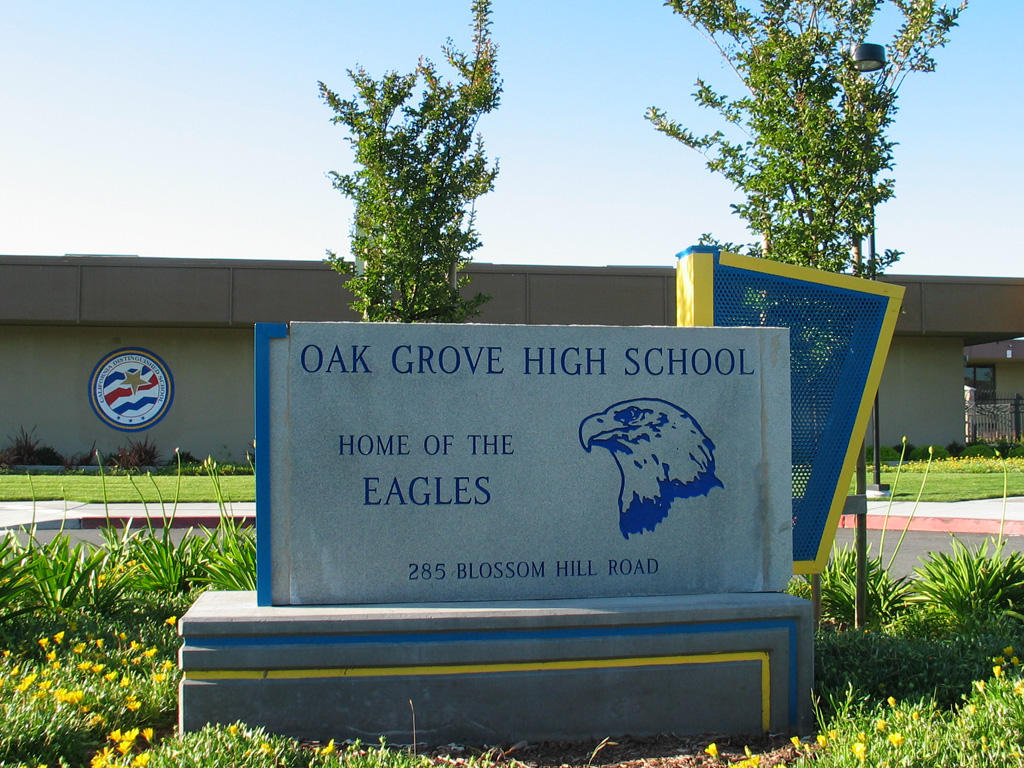
- Oak Grove High School in 2005

Location
- 285 Blossom Hill Road; San Jose, California 95123-2048; United States; 37°15′10″N 121°49′12″W

Information
- Established: 1967
- School district: East Side Union High School District
- Principal: Michael McCoy
- Teaching staff: 66.10 (FTE)
- Enrollment: 1,417 (2023-2024)
- Student to teacher ratio: 21.44
- Colors: Royal blue (traditional); Gold
- Mascot: Eagle
- Website: oakgrovehigh.esuhsd.org

Oak Grove High School is a comprehensive public secondary school located in the Edenvale neighborhood of San Jose, California, United States, which serves students in grades 9–12. Average enrollment is 1450 students, compared to the state average of 1413. The school is part of the East Side Union High School District and its mascot is the eagle. As of July 10, 2026, the principal is Michael D. McCoy.

== Notable alumni ==
- Chidobe Awuzie, NFL player
- DeAndre Brackensick, singer
- Andre Carter, NFL player
- Allen Chapman, NFL player
- Eric Frampton, NFL player
- Mark Grieb, AFL player
- James Hodgins, NFL player
- Mike Holmgren (teacher), NFL coach
- Ash Kalra, California State Assembly Member
- Johnny Khamis, member of the San Jose City Council
- Christina Kim, LPGA Golfer
- Mark Lambert, actor and singer
- Toa Liona, professional wrestler
- Marty Mornhinweg, NFL coach
- Marcus Reese, NFL player
- Tim Ryan, NFL player and NFL color analyst
- Dave Stieb, MLB pitcher
- Karl F. Werner, serial killer
- Michael Whelan, artist/illustrator
- Gibril Wilson, NFL player
