= The Gufs (album) =

Studio album by The Gufs
- Released: 1996
- Genre: Alternative
- Length: 54:00
- Label: Atlantic

The Gufs chronology
Collide (1995)	The Gufs (1996)	Collide Sessions (1997)

The Gufs is a studio album by the rock band The Gufs. It was released in 1996 on Atlantic Records. The album is the band's major record label debut, and mainly consists of songs first released on their 1995 album Collide.

== Track listing ==
All tracks by The Gufs

1. "Smile" - 5:30
2. "Lost Along The Way" - 4:30
3. "Sunday Driver" - 3:52
4. "Crash (Into Me)" - 5:13
5. "Out Somehow" - 3:53
6. "Wasting Time" - 3:16
7. "Listen To The Trees" - 4:11
8. "Life's Sweet Sound" - 4:24
9. "Die Away From You" - 3:49
10. "Let Her Go" - 3:08
11. "Losers Love Song" - 2:32
12. "Fear Me Now" - 4:28
13. "So Easily" - 4:50

== Personnel ==
- Goran Kralj - lead vocals
- Dejan Kralj - bass guitar
- Morgan Dawley - lead guitar, backup vocals
- Scott Schwebel - drums

== See also ==
- The Gufs
