= Eric Frampton =

American football player (born 1984)

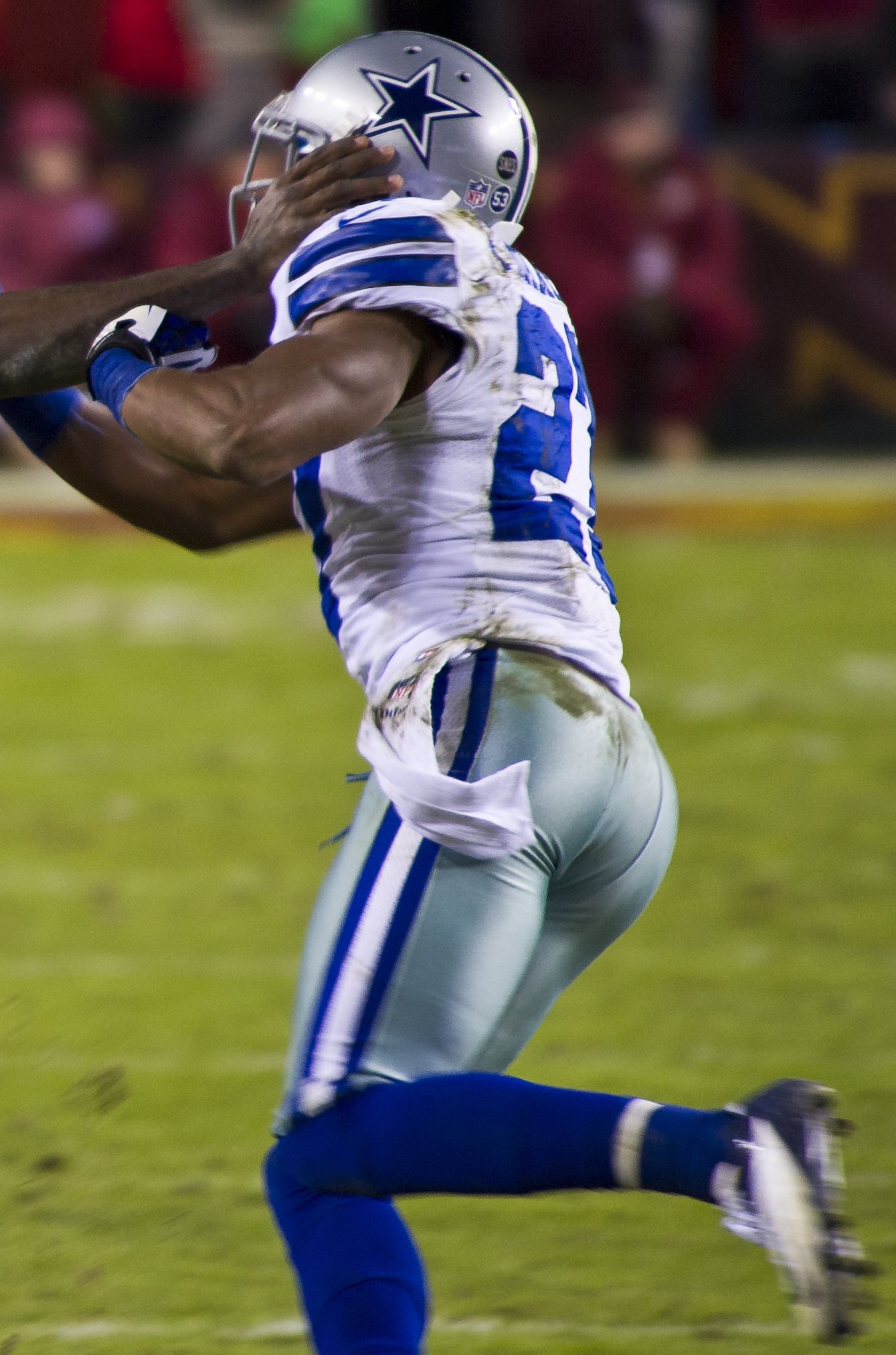
- Frampton with the Dallas Cowboys in 2012

No. 39, 37, 27
- Position: Safety

Personal information
- Born: February 6, 1984 (age 42); San Jose, California, U.S.
- Listed height: 5 ft 11 in (1.80 m)
- Listed weight: 202 lb (92 kg)

Career information
- High school: Oak Grove (San Jose)
- College: Washington State
- NFL draft: 2007: 5th round, 165th overall pick

Career history
- Oakland Raiders (2007)*; Detroit Lions (2007); Minnesota Vikings (2007–2011); Dallas Cowboys (2012); New Orleans Saints (2013)
- * Offseason or practice squad member only

Awards and highlights
- First-team All-Pac-10 (2006)

Career NFL statistics
- Games played: 91
- Total tackles: 110
- Forced fumbles: 2
- Fumble recoveries: 1
- Stats at Pro Football Reference

Eric Ulyssee Frampton (born February 6, 1984) is an American former professional football player who was a safety in the National Football League (NFL) for the Detroit Lions, Minnesota Vikings, Dallas Cowboys, and New Orleans Saints. He was selected by the Oakland Raiders in the fifth round of the 2007 NFL draft. He played college football for the Washington State Cougars.

== Early life ==
Frampton attended Oak Grove High School in San Jose, California, where he was an All-league selection as a junior, after rushing for 17 touchdowns. As a senior, he missed 5 games with a broken collar bone and had 30 tackles in the remaining 6 contests.

He accepted a football scholarship from Washington State University. As a redshirt freshman, he played mainly on special teams, registering 8 defensive tackles in 12 games.

As a sophomore, he appeared in 11 games, making 24 tackles and 3 pass breakups. He received the Washington State Ironman Award in 2004.

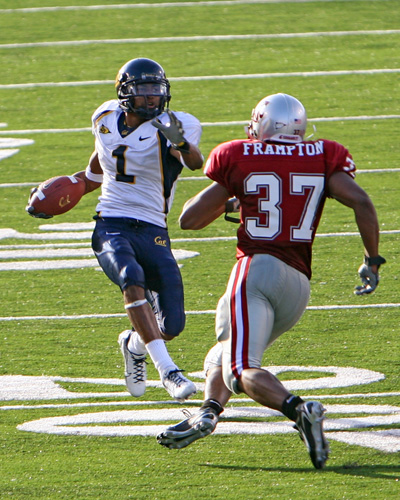
Frampton (right) with Washington State in 2006

As a junior, he became a starter at safety, registering 87 tackles (led the team), one sack, 5.5 tackles for loss, one quarterback pressure, one forced fumble, one fumble recovery, 8 pass deflections and returned one interception for a 36-yard touchdown. He made 13 tackles against USC and Arizona State University.

As a senior, he was the Cougars' leading tackler (100) and played both the free and strong safety position. He also tallied 4 tackles for loss, one sack 13 pass breakups (led the team), 2 forced fumbles and 5 interceptions (led the team) with one returned for a touchdown. He made 11 tackles against USC and 16 against the University of Oregon.

He finished his college career with 23-of-46 starts, 219 tackles (9.5 for loss), 6 interceptions, 2 sacks, 2 quarterback pressures and 2 touchdowns.

== Professional career ==
=== Pre-draft ===
Pre-draft measurables
Height	Weight	Arm length	Hand span	40-yard dash	10-yard split	20-yard split	20-yard shuttle	Three-cone drill	Vertical jump	Broad jump	Bench press
5 ft 11 in (1.80 m)	204 lb (93 kg)	31 7/8 in (0.81 m)	9 in (0.23 m)	4.53 s	1.52 s	2.55 s	4.17 s	6.84 s	36.5 in (0.93 m)	10 ft 2 in (3.10 m)	10 reps

Frampton was timed at 4.61 seconds in the 40-yard dash at the 2007 NFL Scouting Combine, but improved it to 4.51 in the 40 at his College Pro Day.

=== Oakland Raiders ===
He was selected by the Oakland Raiders in the fifth round of the 2007 NFL draft. He was waived before the season started on September 1, 2007.

=== Detroit Lions ===
On September 2, 2007, the Detroit Lions claimed him off waivers. He played in 5 games and had 7 special teams tackles. He was released on October 21.

=== Minnesota Vikings ===
On October 22, 2007, the Minnesota Vikings claimed him off waivers and became a special teams' standout with 14 tackles (fourth on the team). In 2008, he was second on the team with 21 special teams tackles. In 2009, he was fourth on the team with 18 special teams tackles. In 2010, he was third on the team with 10 special teams tackles.

In 2011, he was voted the Vikings' Special Teams MVP by his teammates, after leading the team with a career-best 22 tackles. On August 31, 2012, he was released before the season started.

=== Dallas Cowboys ===
On September 25, 2012, Frampton was signed by the Dallas Cowboys to add depth to a defense depleted by injuries. Although he played in only 13 games, he led the team in special teams tackles (21) and was used in the team's defensive sub-packages, before being named the starter at strong safety for the last 2 games of the season. He finished the year with a career-high 21 tackles, 3 pass breakups and 2 starts on defense. He also had 25 special teams tackles (led the team), 2 passes defensed and one fumble recovery.

He was re-signed on June 4, 2013. He injured his groin during training camp and was placed on the injured reserve list on September 3. He was released with an injury settlement on September 9.

=== New Orleans Saints ===
On December 17, 2013, he was signed as a 2013 by the 2013, reuniting with Rob Ryan who was his defensive coordinator with the Cowboys. The Saints assigned him uniform number 37, previously worn by Saints special teams star Steve Gleason, who also attended Washington State. On January 1, 2014, he was released to make room for linebacker Kyle Knox.
