= Collide (The Gufs album) =

Studio album by The Gufs
- Released: 1995
- Genre: Alternative
- Label: Red Submarine Records

The Gufs chronology
Songs of Life (1992)	Collide (1995)	The Gufs (1996)

Collide is the Third studio album by the Milwaukee-based rock band The Gufs.

== Track listing ==
All tracks by The Gufs

1. "Smile"
2. "Lost Along The Way"
3. "Belong"
4. "Crash (Into Me)"
5. "Out Somehow"
6. "Wasting Time"
7. "Someday Daughter"
8. "Waiting"
9. "Listen To The Trees"
10. "Emily"
11. "Loser's Love Song"
12. "Fear Me Now"

== Personnel ==
- Goran Kralj - lead vocals
- Dejan Kralj - bass guitar
- Morgan Dawley - lead guitar, backup vocals
- Scott Schwebel - drums
- Brian Pettit - percussion
