= Last Embrace (EP) =

EP by Northern Room
- Released: February 28, 2006
- Genre: Alternative rock Indie rock Rock

Northern Room chronology
Last Embrace (2006)	Only Seconds (2007)

Last Embrace is an EP album by the group Northern Room, released on February 28, 2006. All vocals are sung by Andrew Jonathan.

== Track listing ==
=== Standard version ===
#	Track name	Length
1.	Dutch Radio	4:31
2.	Galaxy	4:19
3.	Last Embrace	5:05
4.	Let Me Out	3:59
5.	Everyday	5:30
6.	This Wreckage	4:52

=== Japanese version ===
#	Track name
1.	Waiting
2.	For All These Years
3.	We're On Fire
4.	Dutch Radio
5.	Stars of God
6.	Last Embrace
7.	Galaxy
8.	Let Me Out
9.	Everyday
10.	This Wreckage

== Deluxe edition ==
Last Embrace - Deluxe Edition

Studio album by Northern Room
- Released: November 2, 2008
- Genre: Alternative rock Indie rock Rock

Northern Room chronology
Only Seconds (2007)	Last Embrace - Deluxe Edition (2008)

The Deluxe Edition of Last Embrace is an LP album, released on November 2, 2008. It combines the tracks from the previous EPs, Last Embrace and Only Seconds. New material includes three live acoustic versions of previously released songs and a new song, "Home".

=== Track listing ===
#	Track name	Length
1.	We're On Fire	3:34
2.	For All These Years	3:49
3.	Galaxy	4:20
4.	Dutch Radio	4:31
5.	Stars of God	4:40
6.	Last Embrace	5:06
7.	Waiting	3:29
8.	Let Me Out	3:59
9.	Everyday	5:31
10.	This Wreckage	4:54
11.	Last Embrace (Live Acoustic)	5:01
12.	A Witness (Live Acoustic)	5:32
13.	We're On Fire (Live Acoustic)	4:37
14.	Home	11:21
