= Staring into the Sun =

Studio album by The Gufs
- Released: 1990
- Genre: Alternative
- Length: 47:52
- Label: Red Submarine Records

The Gufs chronology
Staring into the Sun (1990)	Songs of Life (1992)

Staring into the Sun is the first studio album by the Milwaukee-based rock band The Gufs.

== Track listing ==
All tracks by The Gufs

1. "Free Again" - 3:49
2. "Under Breath" - 4:01
3. "So Far Away" - 3:22
4. "Small Town" - 3:55
5. "You Don't Mind" - 4:46
6. "Walk Alone" - 3:39
7. "Staring into the Sun" - 4:41
8. "Reasons Why" - 4:02
9. "Work Song" - 2:59
10. "Fall Back Again" - 2:45
11. "Gone" - 3:16
12. "Some Fine Day" - 6:16

== Personnel ==
- Goran Kralj - lead vocals
- Dejan Kralj - bass guitar
- Morgan Dawley - lead guitar, backup vocals
- Scott Schwebel - drums
