= Any Day Now (Goran Kralj album) =

Studio album by Goran Kralj
- Released: 2004
- Genre: Alternative
- Length: ??:??
- Label: Red Submarine Records

Any Day Now is the first solo release by Goran Kralj. Goran was the lead singer with the Milwaukee-based rock band The Gufs.

== Track listing ==
All tracks are by Goran Kralj

1. "To Be Me" -
2. "Don't Look Back" -
3. "Closer You Get" - 3:56
4. "Ready To Fall" - 3:51
5. "Long Way Out" -
6. "I'll Be Around" -
7. "Easier Said" -
8. "Look In The Mirror" - 4:12
9. "Don't (let the sun go down)" -
10. "Stay" -
11. "Until You're Gone" - 4:14
