= DeAndre Brackensick =

American singer (born 1994)

- Born: DeAndre Scot Brackensick; October 21, 1994 (age 32); San Jose, California, U.S.
- Genre: R&B
- Occupation: Singer
- Instrument: Vocals
- Years active: 2010–present
- Label: Truth Records

DeAndre Scot Brackensick (born October 21, 1994) is an American singer from San Jose, California. He finished in eighth place for the eleventh season of American Idol. Brackensick is signed to Truth Records and released his debut single "Her Crazy" on June 4, 2013.

== Early life ==
Brackensick was born in San Jose, California to a European American father and African American mother. A Hawaiian-born woman adopted Brackensick and his young parents for the first few years of his life. In 2012, Brackensick graduated from Oak Grove High School in San Jose and was elected homecoming king.

He was an active participant in Oak Grove High School's Theater Arts program and the president of the school's Polynesian Club.

== American Idol ==
=== Overview ===
Brackensick initially auditioned for the tenth season of American Idol, but he was cut in the green mile round because the judges felt like he wasn't ready and advised him to come back the following season to audition again. He did return and auditioned for the eleventh season of American Idol in San Diego, California, ultimately making it into the top twelve male contestants.

In the semi-finals, he performed "Reasons" by Earth, Wind & Fire. He was not one of the top five males chosen by America's votes, but was selected as one of six contestants to perform in the wild card round. In this round, he performed "Georgia on My Mind" by Hoagy Carmichael and His Orchestra and was selected as one of the three wild cards to advance to the top 13 by American Idol judge, Steven Tyler. He was consistently praised by the judges for his performances and one of the live audience's favorites. After his performance of Stevie Wonder's, "Master Blaster" American Idol judge, Randy Jackson told Brackensick out of all the contestants for this season he was the most commercial ready, now.

On April 5, 2012 Brackensick was in the bottom three and did not receive enough votes to continue in the competition. He then sang for the one save of the season given to the American Idol judges and once again bringing the audience to their feet in enjoyment. Before he was told the judges decision the audience chanted continuously for them to use their save. American Idol judge Jennifer Lopez, wanted to use the seasons save on him but the shows rules dictate that it has to be a unanimous decision among the judges and unfortunately it was not. He was the last wild card contestant to be eliminated, finishing in eighth place.

=== Performances/results ===
Episode	Theme	Song choice	Original artist	Order #	Result
Audition	Auditioner's Choice	Not aired		N/A	Advanced
Hollywood Round, Part 1	First Solo	Not aired		N/A	Advanced
Hollywood Round, Part 2	Group Performance	Not aired		N/A	Advanced
Hollywood Round, Part 3	Second Solo	Not aired		N/A	Advanced
Las Vegas Round	Songs from the 1950s Group Performance	"It Doesn't Matter Anymore"	Buddy Holly	N/A	Advanced
Final Judgment	Final Solo	"This Woman's Work"	Kate Bush	N/A	Advanced
Top 25 (13 Men)	Personal Choice	"Reasons"	Earth, Wind & Fire	3	Wild Card
Wild Card	Personal Choice	"Georgia on My Mind"	Hoagy Carmichael and His Orchestra	4	Advanced
Top 13	Stevie Wonder	"Master Blaster (Jammin')"	Stevie Wonder	7	Safe
Top 11	Year They Were Born	"Endless Love"	Lionel Richie & Diana Ross	5	Safe
Top 10	Billy Joel	"Only the Good Die Young"	Billy Joel	1	Bottom 3^{1}
Top 9	Their Personal Idols	Solo "Sometimes I Cry"	Eric Benét	6	Safe
Top 9	Their Personal Idols	Trio "The Lady in My Life" / "Rock with You" / "P.Y.T. (Pretty Young Thing)" with Heejun Han & Joshua Ledet	Michael Jackson	8	Safe
Top 8	Songs from the 1980s	Solo "I Like It"	DeBarge	1	Eliminated
Top 8	Songs from the 1980s	Duet "I'm So Excited" with Hollie Cavanagh	The Pointer Sisters	5	Eliminated

- ^Note 1 When Ryan Seacrest announced the results for this particular night, Brackensick was among the Bottom 3, but was declared safe first.

== Post Idol ==
Since Brackensick's elimination, he has been appearing on talk shows such as The Tonight Show with Jay Leno, LIVE! with Kelly, The Today Show, and Anderson Live. Brackensick returned to the American Idol stage for the season eleven finale. He was also part of the American Idol's season eleven top ten finalists concert tour of summer 2012. Brackensick released a single, titled "Her Crazy", through Truth Records on June 4, 2013. A music video for the song was released later that month.

== Single ==
Year	Title	Album	Label
2013	Her Crazy		Truth Records
