= The Gufs =

American band

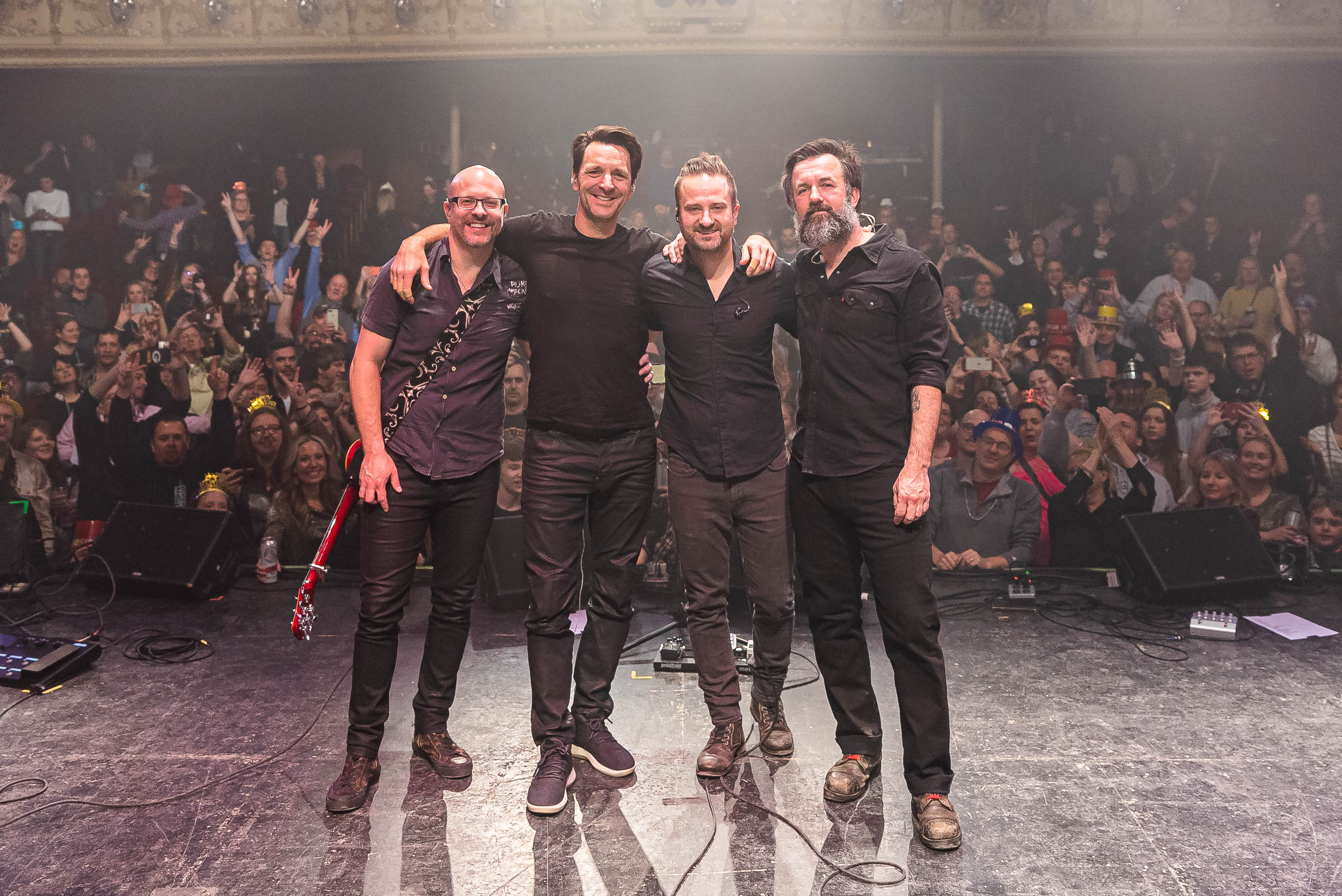
- The Gufs in concert

Background information
- Origin: Milwaukee, Wisconsin
- Genres: pop/rock
- Years active: 1988-present
- Labels: Red Submarine Records, Atlantic Records
- Members: Goran Kralj; Dejan Kralj; Morgan Dawley; Scott Schwebel
- Past members: Tony Luna; Brian Pettit
- Website: www.thegufsmusic.com

The Gufs are an American pop and rock band from Milwaukee, Wisconsin. The band's latest album A Different Sea was released on October 17, 2006. Their first single from the album was "Beautiful Disaster", which was the #2 unsigned artist download in October 2006 at the website www.purevolume.com.

The Gufs are best known for their songs "Smile" and "Crash (into Me)".

To celebrate their twentieth anniversary in 2008, The Gufs played a series of four free concerts with the Milwaukee Symphony Orchestra in June.

== History ==
The Gufs began as an eastside Milwaukee band in 1988, with University of Wisconsin–Milwaukee students Goran Kralj and Scott Schwebel. Kralj and Schwebel, roommates and teammates on UWM's soccer team, recruited Kralj's younger brother, Dejan Kralj (still in high school in Northwestern Indiana), and high school friend Tony Luna, to round-off the quartet on bass and lead guitar. The band took their name from a place where a baby's soul comes from before the child is born, a phrase used in the Demi Moore film The Seventh Sign. After a few years of playing local eastside Milwaukee bars, the band lineup changed, as Luna left in 1990 to pursue a career in sound engineering, opening the way for Marquette University student and Milwaukee native Morgan Dawley to fill the vacancy. The band soon gained momentum, performing more frequently throughout Milwaukee. The band also featured percussionist Brian Pettit on all of their albums up to their Atlantic Records Release of "The Gufs." After the album release and tour, Brian left the band to pursue other interests.

The band took second place at a battle of the bands at Marquette University in 1991.

The band released several independent label records and gained increasing exposure nationwide on college radio before being signed by Atlantic Records. The Gufs' tour with Matchbox Twenty resulted in Rob Thomas singing backup on the song "Give Back Yourself" on their Holiday from You album. The band broke up in 1999 after being disillusioned with the music industry and after feeling like Atlantic wasn't promoting the album properly.

The Gufs got back together in 2006 and released the album A Different Sea. They released the song "A Beautiful Disaster" and went on a national tour. The Gufs have often played Summerfest throughout their career.

== Members ==
- Goran Kralj - lead singer
- Dejan Kralj - bass guitar
- Morgan Dawley - lead guitar and backup vocals
- Scott Schwebel - drums

== Discography ==
=== Albums ===
Year	Title	Label	Other information
1991	Staring Into The Sun	Red Submarine Records	
1992	Songs of Life	Red Submarine Records	
1993	Circa '89	Red Submarine Records	
1995	Collide	Red Submarine Records	
1996	The Gufs	Atlantic Records	This album is composed mainly of material first released on Collide.
1997	Collide Sessions	Red Submarine Records/Don't Records	
1999	Holiday From You	Atlantic Records	The album peaked at #33 on the Billboard magazine Top Heatseekers chart. Holiday From You was re-released on Red Submarine Records, with some alternate tracks and revamped artwork, in 2006.
2006	A Different Sea	Red Submarine Records	The album features string arrangements from the Milwaukee Symphony. Review

=== Live albums ===
Year	Title	Label	Other information
1993	Circa 89	Red Submarine Records	

=== Singles ===
"Smile" was included on the compilation CDs Sounds of the Leisure Class Records: Midwest Collection, and WIIL Rock 95.1 Live. "Smile" was also remixed into a techno trance song at one point in the late 1990s, and recorded acoustic "Give Back Yourself" was included on the compilation CD Aware Compilation, Vol. 7.
