= Clay Aiken discography =

Discography of American pop singer Clay Aiken

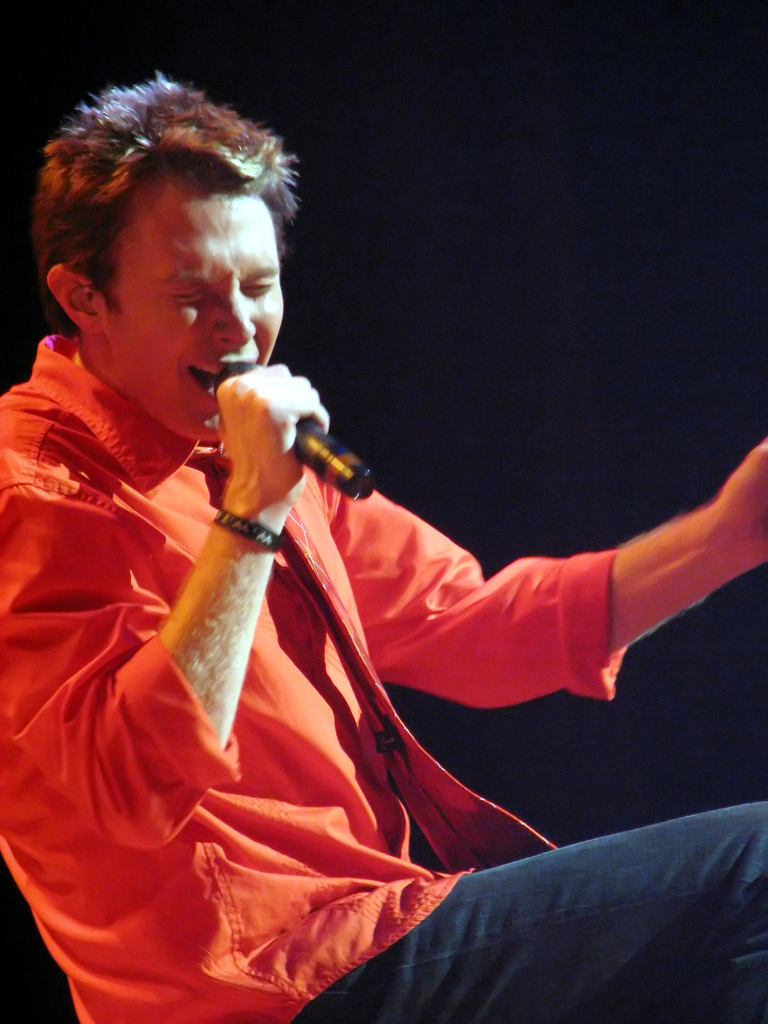
- Aiken during the Jukebox Tour in Merrillville, IN, 2005
- Studio albums: 7
- Extended plays: 1
- Compilation albums: 2
- Singles: 18
- B-sides: 2
- Music videos: 5
- DVDs: 2

The discography of Clay Aiken, an American pop music singer, consists of seven studio albums, eighteen singles, one extended play, two Double A-side CDs (B-sides) and five music videos.

After his appearance on the second season of the television program American Idol in 2003 he signed with RCA Records. His first solo album, Measure of a Man (2003), debuted at number one on the Billboard 200. With 613,000 copies sold in its first week, this was the highest-selling debut for a solo artist in 10 years, and to date the highest debut of any Idol. The album received a double Platinum certification from the RIAA on November 17, 2003.

Aiken's second album was a holiday album titled Merry Christmas with Love (2004), which set a new record for fastest-selling holiday album in the Soundscan era (since 1991). The album debuted at number four on the Billboard 200 and tied Céline Dion's record for the highest debut by a holiday album in the history of Billboard magazine. Merry Christmas with Love sold over 1,000,000 copies retail in six weeks and was the best-selling holiday album of 2004, receiving RIAA Platinum certification on Jan. 6, 2005. This album was re-released in August 2009.

His third album A Thousand Different Ways (2006) debuted at number two on the Billboard 200 and his fourth album On My Way Here (2008) debuted at number four. His first four studio albums debuted in the top five on the Billboard 200.

After the release of On My Way Here, Aiken and RCA parted ways and he signed with Universal Music's Decca Records. His first album with Decca, Tried and True, was released on June 1, 2010 and debuted at number nine on the Billboard 200.

== Albums ==
=== Studio albums ===
Year	Album	Peak chart positions							Certifications	Sales
Year	Album	US	US Internet	US Digital	US Holiday	US Christian	CAN	NZ	Certifications	Sales
2003	Measure of a Man^{[A]}: Released: October 14, 2003; Label: RCA; Format: CD, digital download	1	11	—	—	—	2	9	US: 2× Platinum; CAN: Platinum	US: 2,800,000
2004	Merry Christmas with Love: Released: November 16, 2004; Label: RCA; Format: CD, digital download	4	4	—	1	1	—	—	US: Platinum; CAN: Gold	US: 1,416,000
2006	A Thousand Different Ways: Released: September 19, 2006; Label: RCA; Format: CD, digital download	2	2	2	—	—	6	—	US: Gold; CAN: Gold	US: 530,000
2008	On My Way Here: Released: May 6, 2008; Label: RCA; Format: CD, digital download	4	4	2	—	—	25	—		US: 163,000
2010	Tried and True: Released: June 1, 2010; Label: Decca; Format: CD, digital download	9	—	21	—	—	58	—		US: 56,000
2012	Steadfast: Released: March 27, 2012; Label: Decca; Format: CD, digital download	120	—	—	—	—	—	—		
2024	Christmas Bells Are Ringing: Released: November 22, 2024; Label: Alvis, Inc.; Format: CD, digital download	—	—	—	—	—	—	—		
"—" denotes the album didn't chart.

=== Compilation albums ===
Year	Album	Peak chart positions		Sales
Year	Album	US	US Internet	Sales
2009	Playlist: The Very Best of Clay Aiken: Released: March 31, 2009; Label: Legacy (#8869747028); Format: ECD Note: liner notes, artwork included	173	10	US: 10,000 (as of January 2010)
2010	X2: A Thousand Different Ways/Measure of a Man: Released: September 28, 2010; Label: Legacy (#768404); Format: CD	—	—	

== EPs ==
Year	EP	Sales
2006	All Is Well: Released: November 28, 2006; Label: RCA (#02699)	US: 53,000

== Singles ==
Year	Single	Peak chart position					Album
Year	Single	US	US AC	US Christ.	CAN	NZ	Album
2003	"This Is the Night"	1	13	—	1	1	Non-album single
2003	"Bridge over Troubled Water"	1	29	—	1	1	Non-album single
2004	"Invisible"	37	8	—	—	47	Measure of a Man
2004	"The Way"	4	—	—	1	—	Measure of a Man
2004	"Solitaire"	4	27	—	—	—	Measure of a Man
2004	"I Will Carry You"	—	25	—	—	—	Measure of a Man
2004	"Measure of a Man"	—	—	—	—	—	Measure of a Man
2004	"The First Noel"	—	9	—	—	—	American Idol: The Great Holiday Classics
2004	"Silver Bells" (duet with Kimberley Locke)	—	16	—	—	—	American Idol: The Great Holiday Classics
2004	"Winter Wonderland"	—	13	—	—	—	Merry Christmas with Love
2005	"O Holy Night"	—	37	—	—	—	Merry Christmas with Love
2005	"Hark the Herald Angels Sing / O Come All Ye Faithful"	—	27	—	—	—	Merry Christmas with Love
2005	"Have Yourself a Merry Little Christmas"	—	32	—	—	—	Merry Christmas with Love
2005	"Mary, Did You Know?"	—	35	32	—	—	Merry Christmas with Love
2006	"Without You"	—	28	—	—	—	A Thousand Different Ways
2007	"A Thousand Days"	—	28	—	—	—	A Thousand Different Ways
2008	"On My Way Here"^{[B]}	—	26	—	—	—	On My Way Here
2011	"Bring Back My Love"	—	—	—	—	—	Steadfast
2024	"Do You Hear What I Hear?"	—	—	—	—	—	Christmas Bells Are Ringing
2026	"Rewind"	—	29	—	—	—	Rewind

"—" denotes releases that did not chart.

=== Double A-side CDs ===
Year	Album	Peak chart positions			Certifications	Sales
Year	Album	US	CAN	NZ	Certifications	Sales
2003	"Bridge Over Troubled Water"/"This Is the Night": Released: June 3, 2003; Label: RCA (#51785); Format: CD	1	—	1	US: Platinum; CAN: 6× Platinum	US: 996,000
2004	"The Way"/"Solitaire": Released: March 16, 2004; Label: RCA (#60199); Format: CD	4	1	—	CAN: Platinum	US: 322,000

"—" denotes releases that did not chart.

=== Single certifications ===
Year	Title	US	CAN
2003	"Bridge Over Troubled Water"	Platinum	6× Platinum
2004	"Invisible"	Gold	

== DVDs ==
Year	Video details	Notes
2004	Live – A Clay Aiken Christmas: Released: December 10, 2004; Studio: RCA/BMG (#66261); Format: DVD	Contains A Clay Aiken Christmas taped live at Centerstaging, Burbank, California, 2004 for the televised special. Includes performances by Barry Manilow, Yolanda Adams and Quiana Parler. Behind the scenes footage included. Was certified gold by the Recording Industry Association of America for shipment of 50,000 units in the United States.
2010	Tried and True Live: Released: July 27, 2010; Studio: Decca (B001432209); Format: DVD	Live debut performance from Raleigh Memorial Auditorium in Raleigh, North Carolina concert on March 12, 2010 in support of his Tried and True album. Also includes the songs "Eso Beso", "Who's Sorry Now", "I'll Take Romance", "Breaking Up Is Hard To Do" and "In My Life".

== Music videos ==
Year	Video	Album	Director(s)
2003	"This Is the Night" (Never released)	Bridge Over Troubled Water/This Is the Night	Matthew Rolston
2004	"Invisible" "The Way"	Measure of a Man	Diane Martel
2005	"Proud of Your Boy"	Aladdin	Disney
2007	"A Thousand Days"	A Thousand Different Ways	—N/a
2008	"On My Way Here" (Internet release)	On My Way Here	—N/a

== Other recordings ==
Year	Single	Album
2003	"What the World Needs Now" (with Season 2 Finalists)	American Idol Season 2: All-Time Classic American Love Songs: Label: RCA
2003	"On the Wings of Love"	American Idol Season 2: All-Time Classic American Love Songs: Label: RCA
2003	"God Bless the U.S.A. (Proud to Be an American)" (with Season 2 Finalists)	American Idol Season 2: All-Time Classic American Love Songs: Label: RCA
2003	"The First Noel"	American Idol: The Great Holiday Classics: Label: RCA
2003	"O Come All Ye Faithful"	American Idol: The Great Holiday Classics: Label: RCA
2003	"Silver Bells" (duet with Kimberley Locke)	American Idol: The Great Holiday Classics: Label: RCA
2003	"Santa Claus Is Coming to Town" (with Season 2 Finalists)	American Idol: The Great Holiday Classics: Label: RCA
2004	"Without You" ^{[C]} (duet with Kimberley Locke)	One Love: Label: Curb
2005	"Proud of Your Boy" ^{[D]}	Disneymania, Vol. 3: Label: Walt Disney
2007	"What Are You Doing New Year's Eve?"	Crooner's Christmas: Label: SonyBMG Special Markets
2010	"I Believe We Can" ^{[E]} (duet with Chaka Khan)	Phineas and Ferb – Summer Belongs to You: Label: Walt Disney

== See also ==
- List of number-one hits (United States)
- List of artists who reached number one on the Hot 100 (U.S.)
