= Playlist: The Very Best of Clay Aiken =

Greatest hits album by Clay Aiken
- Released: March 31, 2009
- Recorded: 2003–2009; Mastered by Mark Wilder; Battery Studios, New York
- Genre: Pop
- Length: 56:48
- Label: Legacy, RCA
- Producer: Various
- Compiler: Clay Aiken

Clay Aiken chronology
On My Way Here (2008)	Playlist: The Very Best of Clay Aiken (2009)	Tried and True (2010)

Professional ratings
Review scores
Source	Rating
Allmusic	4/5 stars

Playlist: The Very Best of Clay Aiken is a compilation of remastered original recordings by pop singer Clay Aiken. It is part of a series of similar series of Playlist albums issued by Legacy Recordings.

The track listing includes fan favorites, the No. 1 single “This Is The Night,” the Top 5 “Solitaire” and others handpicked by Aiken from his albums. The album was released on March 31, 2009. A PDF file included on the CD contains the song credits, photographs, and liner notes.

First week sales of 3,000 copies placed Playlist: The Very Best of Clay Aiken at number 173 on the Billboard 200 chart and at number ten on the Top Internet Albums chart.

== Track listing ==
1. "Ashes" (from On My Way Here album)
2. "A Thousand Days" (from A Thousand Different Ways album)
3. "The Way" (from Measure of a Man album)
4. "Bridge Over Troubled Water" (from "Bridge Over Troubled Water/This Is the Night" single)
5. "On My Way Here" (from On My Way Here album)
6. "This Is the Night" (from "Bridge Over Troubled Water/This Is the Night" single)
7. "Solitaire" (from "The Way/Solitaire" single)
8. "Here You Come Again" (from A Thousand Different Ways album)
9. "Measure of a Man" (from Measure of a Man album)
10. "The Real Me" (from On My Way Here album)
11. "Something About Us" (from On My Way Here album)
12. "Invisible" (from Measure of a Man album)
13. "On the Wings of Love"(from American Idol Season 2: All-Time Classic American Love Songs compilation)
14. "Mary, Did You Know" (from Merry Christmas with Love album)

=== Song notes ===
- "Ashes" Written by: Nichole Nordeman, Mark Hammond / Produced by: Kipper – 3:44
- "A Thousand Days" Written by: Christian Leuzzi, Aldo Nova & Emanuel Olsson / Produced by: John Fields – 4:30
- "The Way" Written by: Steve Morales, Enrique Iglesias, Kara DioGuardi, David Siegel / Produced by: Steve Morales – 4:07
- ""Bridge Over Troubled Water" Written by: Paul Simon / Produced by: Nigel Wright – 4:01
- "On My Way Here" Written by: Ryan Tedder, Hunter Davis, Chris Faulk / Produced by: Kipper – 4:29
- "This Is the Night" Written by: Aldo Nova, Gary Burr, Chris Braide / Produced by: Steve Mac – 3:33
- "Solitaire" Written by: Neil Sedaka & Phil Cody / Produced by: Cliff Magness & Steve Mac – 5:26
- "Here You Come Again" Written by: Barry Mann & Cynthia Weil / Produced by: Adam Anders – 3:34
- "Measure of a Man" Written by: Steve Morales, Cathy Dennis, David Siege / Produced by: Steve Morales – 3:58
- "The Real Me" Written by: Natalie Grant / Produced by: Kipper – 4:38
- "Something About Us" Written by: Michael O'Brien, Scotty Wilbanks, Regie Hamm / Produced by: Kipper – 3:40
- "Invisible" Written by: Desmond Child, Andreas Carlsson, Chris Braide / Produced by: Desmond Child – 4:04
- "On the Wings of Love" Written by: Jeffrey Osborne, P. Schless / Produced by: James McMillan – 3:44
- "Mary Did You Know" Written by: Lee Rufus GreenebIII, Mark Alan Lowry / Produced by: Walter Afanasieff – 3:20

== Notes ==
- "The Way"/"Solitaire" was released as a commercial single on March 16, 2004. "The Way" peaked at number one on the Canadian Singles Chart. In the summer of 2004, a second version of the Measure of a Man album was released in which "Solitaire" replaced "This is the Night" as a bonus cut. "The Way" music video was directed by Diane Martel. Instead of the traditional Hollywood types Aiken hired everyday people to play the couples shown in this video.
- "The Real Me" was originally recorded by Natalie Grant for her album Awaken (2005). Aiken stated in an interview that Grant rewrote some of the lyrics for him.
- "Something About Us" was written and recorded by Michael O'Brien for his album Something About Us (2007).
- "Invisible" was the first single from the album Measure of a Man. It peaked at number eight on the Billboard Adult Contemporary and at number 37 on the Billboard Hot 100 charts on January 6, 2004. The music video for "Invisible", directed by Diane Martel, was shot in Hollywood at Hollywood & Highland, a major outdoor shopping center and tourist attraction. Aiken invited 800 fans to be part of the crowd scene in the video.
- "On the Wings of Love" was included as a second bonus track on the Measure of a Man album released in Japan.
