= Canadian Idol alumni album sales =

This article shows the highest selling contestants from Canadian Idol and the highest selling American Idol albums. These sales are Canadian sales only.

== Canadian Idol ==
=== CI Artists with CRIA certified albums ===
This first list only includes contestants with at least one certified album. (Canadian Sales ONLY) Gold, Platinum, and/or Multi-platinum

	Former contestant Total sales	Debut album	Second album	Third album	Fourth album	Fifth album	Sixth album	Seventh album
1.	Jacob Hoggard (Season 2, 3rd Place); 620,000	Hedley (September 6, 2005); Universal Records; 2× Platinum; 200,000; Peak: #3	Famous Last Words (October 30, 2007); Universal Records; Platinum; 100,000; Peak: #3	The Show Must Go (November 17, 2009); Universal Records; 2× Platinum; 160,000; Peak: #6	Storms (November 8, 2011); Universal Records; Platinum; 80,000; Peak: #2	Wild Life (November 11, 2013); Universal Records; Platinum; 80,000; Peak: #4		
2.	Kalan Porter (Season 2, Winner); 400,000	219 Days (November 23, 2004); Sony BMG Records; 2× Platinum; 200,000; Peak: #4	Wake Up Living (August 28, 2007); Sony BMG Records; 2× Platinum; 200,000; Peak: #4					
3.	Ryan Malcolm (Season 1, Winner); 178,500	Home (December 23, 2003); BMG Records; Platinum; 170,000; Peak: #4	Urgency (March 27, 2007); I Heart Records n/a 8,500; Peak: did not chart	Through These Walls (May 8, 2011); Brave Rekords n/a n/a Peak: did not chart				
4.	Toya Alexis (Season 1, 6th Place); 159,000	S.O.B. Story (August 2, 2005); Plasma Records; Platinum; 159,000; Peak: did not chart						
5.	Carly Rae Jepsen (Season 5, 3rd place); 144,700	Tug of War (September 29, 2008); Maple Records n/a 15,000; Peak: did not chart	Curiosity (February 14, 2012); 604 Records; Gold; 50,000; Peak: #6	Kiss (September 18, 2012); 604 Records; Gold; 60,000; Peak: #5	E•MO•TION (June 24, 2015); 604 Records; N/A; 10,000; Peak: #8	Dedicated/Dedicated Side B (May 17, 2019); 604 Records n/a 4,500; Peak: #18	The Loneliest Time (October 21, 2022); 604 Records n/a 2,000; Peak: #18	The Loveliest Time (July 28, 2023); 604 Records n/a 700; Peak: #NA
6.	Rex Goudie (Season 3, Runner-Up); 120,000	Under the Lights (December 13, 2005); Sony BMG Records; Platinum; 100,000; Peak: #5	Look Closer (December 12, 2006); Sony BMG Records n/a 20,000; Peak: #19	One Hundred Pages Later (December 7, 2010); Fontana North n/a n/a Peak: did not chart				
7.	Gary Beals (Season 1, Runner-Up); 110,000	Gary Beals (August 17, 2004); Liberated Entertainment; Platinum; 110,000; Peak: #10	The Rebirth Of... (June 9, 2009); Liberated Entertainment n/a n/a Peak: did not chart					
8.	Eva Avila (Season 4, Winner); 90,000	Somewhere Else (November 14, 2006); Sony BMG Records; Gold; 80,000; Peak: #6	Give Me the Music (October 28, 2008); Sony BMG Records n/a 10,000; Peak: #63					
9.	Theresa Sokyrka (Season 2, Runner-Up); 80,000	These Old Charms (April 26, 2005); Maple Records; Gold; 70,000; Peak: #4	Something Is Expected (September 5, 2006); Maple Records n/a 10,000; Peak: did not chart	Wrapped in Ribbon (November 5, 2007); Maple Records n/a n/a Peak: did not chart	Theresa Sokyrka (November 30, 2010); Maple Records n/a n/a Peak: did not chart			
10.	Melissa O'Neil (Season 3, Winner); 70,000	Melissa O'Neil (November 22, 2005); Sony Music; Gold; 70,000; Peak: #14						
11.	Brian Melo (Season 5, Winner); 52,000	Livin' It (November 27, 2007); Sony BMG; Gold; 52,000; Peak: #14	The Truth (October 12, 2010); Rat Pack Records/Fontana North n/a n/a Peak: did not chart					
12.	Rob James (Season 4, 7th Place); 50,000	McMaster & James (November 21, 2000); Sony BMG; Gold; 50,000; Peak: did not chart						
13.	Tara Oram (Season 5, 6th Place); 50,000	Chasing the Sun (October 7, 2008); Open Road Records; Gold; 50,000; Peak: #8	Revival (July 19, 2011); Open Road Records n/a n/a Peak: #70					
14.	Laurell John (Season 1, Semi-Finalist); 40,000	Into Your Love (2003); Polytel/PolyGram; Gold; 40,000; Peak: #1						

=== CI Artists without CRIA certified albums ===
The following is a comprehensive list of other Canadian Idol alumni album sales and reflects that commercial success can be achieved through association with Canadian Idol and with post-Idol promotion, although the degree of success varies considerably:

	Former Contestant	Total Sales	Albums
15.	Audrey De Montigny (Season 1, 4th Place)	35,000	Audrey (2004) did not chart; Si L'Amour Existe (2006) did not chart; Take Me As I Am (2006) did not chart; "Un Seul Instant" (2012) did not chart
16.	Jaydee Bixby (Season 5, Runner-up)	28,300	Cowboys and Cadillacs (2008) #8; Easy to Love (2010) #8; Work in Progress (2013) did not chart
17.	Jason Greeley (Season 2, 4th Place)	12,000	Live...Love...Sing (2005) did not chart; Jason Greeley (2009) did not chart
18.	Shane Wiebe (Season 2, 5th Place)	10,000	Shane Wiebe (2005) #71; Into Your Light (2009) did not chart; Christmas With You (2009) did not chart; Restore the Wonder (2010) did not chart
19.	Katherine St-Laurent (Season 6, 9th Place)	5,000	Katherine St-Laurent (2011) did not chart
20.	Aaron Walpole (Season 3, 3rd Place)	3,000	Aaron Walpole (2006) did not chart
21.	Drew Wright (Season 6, 3rd Place)	2,000	Fall and Divide (2008) did not chart
22.	Mikey Bustos (Season 1, 8th Place)	2,000	Love Me Again (2004) did not chart; Memoirs of a Superhero (2008) did not chart
23.	Suzi Rawn (Season 3, 4th Place)	950	Naked (2006) did not chart
24.	Theo Tams (Season 6, Winner)	300	Unexpected (2005) did not chart; Give It All Away (2009) #29
25.	Brandon Jones (Season 4, 8th Place)	200	All for You (2007) did not chart
26.	Chris LaBelle (Season 4, Top 22)	90	Two Weeks Tuesday (2006) did not chart; Bad Influence (2010) did not chart

== American Idol ==
=== AI Artists with CRIA certified albums ===
	Former contestant Total sales	Debut album	Second album	Third album	Fourth album	Fifth album	Sixth album
1.	Kelly Clarkson (Season 1, Winner); 940,000	Thankful (April 15, 2003); RCA Records; Platinum; 100,000; Peak: #2	Breakaway (November 30, 2004); RCA Records; 5× Platinum; 500,000; Peak: #6	My December (June 26, 2007); RCA Records; Platinum; 100,000; Peak: #2	All I Ever Wanted (March 10, 2009); RCA Records; Platinum; 80,000; Peak: #2	Stronger (October 24, 2011); RCA Records; Platinum; 80,000; Peak: #4	Wrapped in Red (October 29, 2013); RCA Records; Platinum; 80,000; Peak: #6
2.	Carrie Underwood (Season 4, Winner); 809,000	Some Hearts (November 15, 2005); Arista Nashville; 3× Platinum; 400,000; Peak: #11	Carnival Ride (October 23, 2007); Arista Nashville; Platinum; 200,000; Peak: #1	Play On (November 3, 2009); Arista Nashville; Platinum; 80,000; Peak: #2	Blown Away (May 1, 2012); Arista Nashville; Platinum; 129,000; Peak: #1		
3.	Chris Daughtry (Season 5, 4th Place); 320,000	Daughtry (November 21, 2006); RCA Records; 2× Platinum; 200,000; Peak: #8	Leave This Town (June 14, 2009); RCA Records; Platinum; 80,000; Peak: #2	Break the Spell (November 21, 2011); RCA Records; Gold; 40,000; Peak: #13	Baptized (November 19, 2013); RCA Records; TBA; TBA; Peak: #16		
4.	Clay Aiken (Season 2, Runner-Up); 200,000	Measure of a Man (October 14, 2003); RCA Records; Platinum; 100,000; Peak: #2	Merry Christmas With Love (November 16, 2004); RCA Records; Gold; 50,000; Peak: did not chart	A Thousand Different Ways (September 19, 2006); RCA Records; Gold; 50,000; Peak: #6	On My Way Here (May 6, 2008); RCA Records n/a n/a Peak: #25	Tried and True (June 1, 2010); Decca/Universal n/a n/a Peak: #58	Steadfast (March 27, 2012); Decca/Universal n/a n/a Peak: did not chart
5.	Fantasia Barrino (Season 3, Winner); 200,000	Free Yourself (November 23, 2004); J Records; 2× Platinum; 200,000; Peak: did not chart	Fantasia (December 12, 2006); J Records n/a n/a Peak: did not chart	Back To Me (August 24, 2010); J Records n/a n/a Peak: did not chart			
6.	Jordin Sparks (Season 6, Winner); 100,000	Jordin Sparks (November 20, 2007); Jive; Gold; 70,000; Peak: #12	Battlefield (July 20, 2009); Jive n/a 30,000; Peak: #10				
7.	Adam Lambert (Season 8, Runner-Up); 87,300	For Your Entertainment (November 23, 2009); RCA Records; Platinum; 80,000; Peak: #8	Trespassing (May 15, 2012); RCA Records n/a 7,300; Peak: #1				
8.	Phillip Phillips (Season 11, Winner); 80,000	The World from the Side of the Moon (November 19, 2012); Interscope Records; Platinum; 80,000; Peak: #9	Behind the Light (May 19, 2014); Interscope Records n/a n/a Peak: #7				
9.	David Cook (Season 7, Winner); 50,000	David Cook (November 18, 2008); RCA Records; Gold; 50,000; Peak: #11	This Loud Morning (June 28, 2011); RCA Records n/a n/a Peak: #23				

=== AI Artists without CRIA certified albums ===
	Former Contestant	Total Sales	Albums
10.	Jennifer Hudson (Season 3, 7th Place)	49,000	Jennifer Hudson (2008) did not chart; Hope for Haiti Now (2010) #1; I Remember Me (2011) did not chart
11.	Scotty McCreery (Season 10, Winner)	16,837	Clear as Day (2011) #4 - n/a; Christmas with Scotty McCreery (2012) did not chart - 13,126; See You Tonight (2013) #25 - 3,711
12.	David Archuleta (Season 7, Runner-Up)	n/a	David Archuleta (2008) #14; Christmas from the Heart (2009) did not chart; The Other Side of Down (2010) #68; Begin (2012) did not chart; No Matter How Far (2013) did not chart
13.	Lauren Alaina (Season 10, Runner-Up)	n/a	Wildflower (2011) #22
14.	Kellie Pickler (Season 5, 6th Place)	n/a	Small Town Girl (2006) did not chart; Kellie Pickler (2008) #67; 100 Proof (2012) #36; The Woman I Am (2013) did not chart
15.	Ruben Studdard (Season 2, Winner)	n/a	Souful (2003) #37; I Need an Angel (2004) did not chart; The Return (2006) did not chart; Love Is (2009) did not chart; Letters from Birmingham (2012) did not chart
16.	Taylor Hicks (Season 5, Winner)	n/a	Taylor Hicks (2006) #43; Early Works (2008) did not chart; The Distance (2009) did not chart
17.	Kris Allen (Season 8, Winner)	n/a	Kris Allen (2009) #50; Thank You Camellia (2012) #93
18.	Haley Reinhart (Season 10, 3rd Place)	n/a	Listen Up! (2012) #52
19.	Bo Bice (Season 4, Runner-Up)	n/a	The Real Thing (2005) #60; See the Light (2007) did not chart; 3 (2010) did not chart
20.	Lee DeWyze (Season 9, Winner)	n/a	Live It Up (2010) #79; Frames (2013) did not chart
21.	Crystal Bowersox (Season 9, Runner-up)	n/a	Farmer's Daughter (2010) #90; All That for This (2013) did not chart
22.	Danny Gokey (Season 8, 3rd Place)	n/a	My Best Days (2010) #95
