= Merry Christmas with Love (song) =

Christmas song by Greg Wayne Davis and Billy Smiley

"Merry Christmas with Love" is a Christmas song by Greg Wayne Davis and Billy Smiley. It is a song about an older woman who is alone for Christmas and has given up hope for being happy, when a group of carolers comes to cheer her up by singing, "Merry Christmas with love." She embraces them and joins in at the end.

The song was first recorded by Sandi Patty, then known as Sandi Patti, for her 1983 Christmas album The Gift Goes On. More recently, it was recorded by Clay Aiken as the title track of his 2004 Christmas album Merry Christmas with Love.
