= Raleigh Boychoir =

The Raleigh Boychoir
- Origin: Raleigh, North Carolina, United States
- Genres: Classical, Folk, Patriotic, Musical Theater, Popular Music
- Years active: 1968–present
- Members: Artistic Director & Conductor; Jeremy Tucker; Training Choir Conductor & Principal Accompanist Emeritus; Vicki Oehling; Resident Choir Director; Danny Yancey; Principal Accompanist; Megan Yohman
- Past members: Founder; Thomas Sibley; Artistic Director; Robert Unger
- Website: www.raleighboychoir.org

The Raleigh Boychoir is a 70-member choral group based in Raleigh, North Carolina, that trains elementary and high school-aged boys in singing and performing choral music in the tradition of "boychoir".

== History ==
The Raleigh Boychoir was established in October 1968 by Thomas E. Sibley with 20 boys and a $50 contribution from the Woman's Club of Raleigh. Sibley, who served as coordinator of music for Raleigh public schools, and as organist and choirmaster of Holy Trinity Lutheran Church in Raleigh, founded the choir because he was concerned about the lack of choral experiences and performance opportunities for boys whose voices had not changed. He also believed in developing the etiquette of young boys.

The newly formed boychoir offered a public concert during its first Christmas season in 1968. That first "Carols of Christmas" concert has become a Yuletide tradition for many in the greater Raleigh area. Mr. Sibley conducted his 40th and final holiday concert in 2008.

Among the alumni of the boychoir is professional singer Clay Aiken.

== Repertoire ==
The Boychoir is committed both to artistic excellence and to developing each boy's confidence and character. The Raleigh Boychoir’s repertoire includes sacred and secular classics, selections from musical theater, and a rich assortment of American folk music and patriotic music.

The Raleigh Boychoir has performed at the White House, Carnegie Hall and the National Cathedral, and has toured throughout the United States and Europe. The Raleigh Boychoir is composed of the following choirs:

Performing Choir
Resident Choir
Training Choir
Young Men's Ensemble
Alumni Choir

Some Raleigh Boychoir choristers have moved on to other top boychoirs around the world, including the American Boychoir, St. Thomas Choir of Men and Boys and the Vienna Boys' Choir.

== Musical education and personal development ==
In addition providing performance opportunities, the Raleigh Boychoir provides musical training for every choir member. They also learn to read and sight-read/sight-sing music.

Participating in the Raleigh Boychoir also affords choristers the opportunity to develop confidence, poise, character, discipline and leadership abilities. Each chorister devotes numerous hours over weeks, months and years to help sustain the choral tradition of boychoir singing.

== Auditions ==
The Raleigh Boychoir holds auditions several times per year. Interested boys and their parents come to the Raleigh Boychoir Center to learn more about the choir and meet with the artistic directors. Auditions are open to school-aged boys. New boys are allowed to participate in a trial period of a month before committing to a semester-based tuition.
