= On My Way Here (song) =

Single by Clay Aiken

from the album On My Way Here
- Released: April 2008
- Recorded: 2008; Legacy Studios, New York City, New York
- Length: 4:28
- Label: RCA
- Songwriters: Ryan Tedder, Hunter Davis, Chris Faulk
- Producer: Kipper

Clay Aiken singles chronology
"A Thousand Days" (2007)	"On My Way Here" (2008)	"Bring Back My Love" (2011)

"On My Way Here" is a song written by Ryan Tedder, Hunter Davis and Chris Faulk and is the title track for Clay Aiken's fourth album On My Way Here.

The song is about how the lessons we learn growing up shape us into the adults we become. This struck a chord with Aiken and the song became the inspiration for the album's theme. Aiken said "I thought if we could find songs along those lines, that deal with my life over the past five years and what I've learned from my experiences, it would be a great concept for an album."

== Chart positions ==
Chart (2008)	Peak position
U.S. Billboard Adult Contemporary	36

== In popular culture ==
"On My Way Here" is included on the Super Hero album commemorating the 2008 Beijing Olympics presented by MBA Sports. The song was played in the background of several MBC-TV promos for Olympic programming in Korea. The Super Hero story is highlighted on the Korean website Yes24.com with "On My Way Here" playing in the background.

== Discography ==
- Clay Aiken discography
