= On My Way Here =

Studio album by Clay Aiken
- Released: May 6, 2008
- Length: 49:23
- Label: RCA
- Producer: Mark "Kipper" Eldridge

Clay Aiken chronology
All Is Well (2006)	On My Way Here (2008)	Playlist: The Very Best of Clay Aiken (2009)

Singles from On My Way Here
- 1. "On My Way Here" Released: April 2008

On My Way Here is the fourth studio album by American singer Clay Aiken. It was released on May 6, 2008, through RCA Records. Featuring a blend of ballads and pop-rock, the album explores a range of styles and tempos. Seeking a more unified sound, Aiken worked primarily with Grammy Award–winning British producer Mark "Kipper" Eldridge, with Jaymes Foster serving as executive producer.

The album received mixed reviews, with some critics praising its maturity and vocal focus while others criticized its theatrical, adult contemporary sound. On My Way Here debuted at number four on the US Billboard 200 with first-week sales of 94,000 copies and had sold 163,000 units in the United States by July 2009, while also debuting at number 25 on the Canadian Albums Chart. It was his final studio album for RCA Records, the label that signed him following American Idol.

== Background ==
Aiken collaborated with producer Mark "Kipper" Eldridge on the album, with executive producer Jaymes Foster helping shape its direction. Inspired by the song "On My Way Here," written by Ryan Tedder of OneRepublic and originally intended for his 2002 debut album under Freelance Entertainment, which became defunct before the album could be released, Aiken described the project as reflecting personal growth and the life experiences that shaped him as he approached his thirties. He noted that the album placed greater emphasis on lyrical meaning than his previous work and was created without concern for radio success, focusing instead on songs that resonated with him personally and suited his voice.

In an interview with Linda Loveland of WRAL-TV prior to the album's release, Aiken said that a couple of the songs on On My Way Here, while previously recorded, had not been widely heard. "The Real Me" was originally recorded by Natalie Grant for her album Awaken (2005). Aiken stated in an interview that Grant rewrote some of the lyrics for him. "The Real Me" was covered by Jessie Clark Funk on the 2009 Be Thou An Example album. "Something About Us" was written and recorded by Michael O'Brien for his album Something About Us (2007). "As Long as We're Here" was recorded by Kristy Starling for her self-titled debut album (2003). The last track "Lover All Alone", written by Aiken and David Foster, was originally released as an iTunes bonus with Aiken's A Thousand Different Ways album.

== Promotion ==
The title track, "On My Way Here", written by OneRepublic frontman Ryan Tedder along with Hunter Davis and Chris Faulk, was the only single released. In further support, promotion for On My Way Here included a series of short filmed interviews of Aiken commenting on the making of the album. These webisodes were released to his official YouTube page. Aiken also debuted the album on QVC before its release. As a bonus with pre-orders, a second Enhanced CD was included containing three live Sessions@AOL recordings, one unreleased recording and an unreleased video that had been filmed for his 2003 Measure of a Man album.

== Critical reception ==
Professional ratings
Review scores
Source	Rating
About.com	4/5 stars
AllMusic	3/5 stars
Entertainment Weekly	C+
IGN	4.4/10
Slant Magazine	1.5/5 stars
USA Today	2/4 stars

AllMusic editor Stephen Thomas Erlewine found that On My Way Here had Aiken moving "out of the freeze-dried karaoke of A Thousand Different Ways and into something that feels a little bit more modern [...] This is an entirely welcome development for Clay, as he sounds at ease here in a way he never did on A Thousand Different Ways [...] That's surely not the case here: no songs are familiar, most feel tailored to Aiken's strengths, and he even bears a writing credit on the closing "Lover All Alone." [...] Still, On My Way Here is totally, completely for the fans." Bill Lamb from About.com noted that "the production throughout this album is wisely toned down to make plenty of room for Aiken's warm, sweet vocals. The songwriting, while not spectacular, is solid throughout. However, if polished adult contemporary is not your thing, this is a collection to pass by."

Entertainment Weekly's Mikael Wood gave the album a C+ rating and wrote: "It comes as no surprise that On My Way Here [...] comes caked in theatrics. On the title track, Aiken chews over tough childhood memories as a syrupy string section saws away, while "Falling" finds him both holding on to and attempting to let go of a "never-ending dream." Yet you've gotta hand it to the guy: Nobody does overblown soft rock with more panache." IGN critic Chad Grischow felt that On My Way Here was "the kind of album US troops could have really used in December 1989. Manuel Noriega would have never stood a chance, as these bland soft pop tunes would have greatly expedited his surrender. Aiken has a decent voice, but so far, he is like a superhero that chooses to use his powers for evil." Slant Magazine's Sal Cinquemani wrote: "On My Way Here isn't any easier to swallow than the American Idol alum's Measure of a Man."

== Commercial performance ==
On My Way Here debuted at number four on the US Billboard 200, selling 94,000 units in its first week of release. By July 2009, the album had sold 163,000 copies domestically. It also opened at number 25 on the Canadian Albums Chart in the week ending May 24, 2008.

== Track listing ==
On My Way Here track listing
No.	Title	Writer(s)	Length
1.	"On My Way Here"	Ryan Tedder; Hunter Davis; Chris Faulk	4:25
2.	"Ashes"	Nichole Nordeman; Mark Hammond	3:39
3.	"Everything I Don't Need"	Kipper; Judie Tzuke; James Morrison	4:27
4.	"Something About Us"	Michael O'Brien; Scotty Wilbanks; Regie Hamm	3:36
5.	"Falling"	Martin Hansen; Magnus Kaxe; Fred Alexander	3:22
6.	"Where I Draw the Line"	Jeremy Bose; Clint Lagerberg; Jason Walker	4:21
7.	"The Real Me"	Natalie Grant	4:36
8.	"Weight of the World"	Franne Golde; Kasia Livingston; Henrik Korpi; Mathias Wollo	3:42
9.	"As Long as We're Here"	Jan Buckingham; Rebecca Lynn Howard	4:39
10.	"Sacrificial Love"	Carl Falk; Sharon Vaughn; Didrik Thott	4:11
11.	"Grace of God"	Mads Hauge; Don Mescall	3:33
12.	"Lover All Alone"	Clay Aiken; David Foster; Emanuel Kiriakou	4:52
Total length:			49:23

Bonus tracks
No.	Title	Writer(s)	Length
13.	"Forget I Ever Knew You" (Wal-Mart exclusive)	Greg Critchley
14.	"It's In Everyone Of Us" (iTunes exclusive when pre-ordered)	David Pomeranz

QVC bonus disc
No.	Title	Writer(s)	Length
1.	"When I Need You"		4:06
2.	"Invisible" (live at Sessions@AOL)	Chris Braide; Andreas Carlsson; Desmond Child	3:31
3.	"Measure of a Man" (live at Sessions@AOL)	Morales; Cathy Dennis; David Siegel	3:47
4.	"I Will Carry You" (live at Sessions@AOL)	Lindy Robbins; Dennis Matkosky; Jess Cates	3:39
5.	"This Is The Night" (music video)

Notes

- A MusicPass edition of the album, released as a gift card, provided a digital version for iPods and MP3 players, plus bonus content including a digital booklet and three music videos: "Invisible," "The Way," and "A Thousand Days."

== Personnel ==
Strings

- David Hartley – Arranger
- Dermot Crehan – Violin (solo on "As Long as We're Here")
- Perry Montague-Mason – Violin
- Warren Zielinski – Violin
- Emlyn Singleton – Violin
- Patrick Kierman – Violin
- Boguslaw Kostecki – Violin
- Tom Bowes – Violin
- Maciej Rakowski – Violin
- Julian Leaper – Violin
- Chris Tombling – Violin
- Dave Woodcock – Violin
- Cameron Stone – Cello
- Mark Berrow – Violin
- Jackie Shave – Violin
- Jonathan Rees – Violin
- Dermot Crehan – Violin
- Peter Lale – Viola
- Bruce White – Viola
- Katie Wilkinson – Viola
- Rachael Bolt – Viola
- Anthony Pleeth – Cello
- Martin Loveday – Cello
- Dave Daniels – Cello
- Jonthan Williams – Cello
- Chris Laurence – Bass

Other performers and musicians

- Emanuel Kiriakou – Piano, Guitar (Acoustic & Electric), keyboards
- Doug Petty – Hammond B-3
- Keith Carlock – drums
- Freddie Washington – Bass
- Jon Herington – guitars
- Jeff Young – Piano, B3 Hammond, Background Vocals
- Oz Noy – Guitars (appears courtesy of Magnatude Records)
- Keith Beauvais – Guitars, Production
- Jimi Englund – Shaker
- David Foster – Piano ("The Real Me")
- David Hartley – Piano ("Something About Us" and "Sacrificial Love"),
- Dominic Miller – Nylon Guitar ("Sacrificial Love")
- Jon Ossman – Bass ("Falling")
- Kipper – Keyboards, Programming
- Mark Neary – Additional Pro Tools
- Quiana Parler – Background vocals
- Angela Fisher – Background Vocals
- Jenny Hill – Background Vocals
- Windy Wagner – Background Vocals
- Sumudu Jayatilaka – Background Vocals

Technical

- Nathaniel Kunkel – Recorded and Mixed
- Cameron Craig – String Engineer
- Joe Harding – Engineer
- Chris Jennings – Engineer
- Wesley Seidman – Engineer
- Jorge Vivo – Engineer
- Bernard Levin – Asst. Engineer
- Dale Parsons – Asst. Engineer
- Nick Banns – Asst. Engineer
- Tyler Van Dalen – Asst. Engineer
- David Jones – Asst. Engineer

Recording and mixing

- Lower Barn, London, UK
- Legacy Studios, New York City, NY
- Grove Studios, London, UK
- Ocean Way Recording, Los Angeles, CA
- Robert Irving Studios, Los Angeles, CA
- Studio Without Walls, Los Angeles, CA – mixing
- Marcussen Mastering, Hollywood, CA – mastering
- Lover All Alone
  - Chalice Studios/Studio E, Los Angeles, CA – recording, mixing
  - NRG Studios, North Hollywood, CA

== Charts ==
Weekly performance for On My Way Here
Chart (2008)	Peak position
Canadian Albums (Billboard)	25
US Billboard 200	4
