= Learning to Sing =

2004 memoir by Clay Aiken and Allison Glock

Learning to Sing: Hearing the Music in Your Life
- Author: Clay Aiken; Allison Glock
- Cover artist: Design: Richard Rossiter; Photograph: Eric Ogden
- Language: English
- Subject: Memoir
- Publisher: Random House; New York City, NY
- Publication date: November 16, 2004
- Publication place: United States
- Media type: Print / audio Hardcover, paperback, CD, eBook
- Pages: 258
- ISBN: 1-4000-6392-2
- OCLC: 56413034
- Dewey Decimal: 782.42164/092 B 22
- LC Class: ML420.A385 A3 2004

Learning to Sing: Hearing the Music in Your Life is a memoir written by Clay Aiken with Allison Glock. Published by Random House on November 16, 2004, Learning to Sing debuted at number two on the New York Times Hardcover Nonfiction best-seller list in the December 5 issue, and remained on that list for the remainder of the year.

== Synopsis ==
The book focuses on the people who have been most influential in Aiken's life. He narrates his many conflicts with his birth father and stepfather, and the bullying that he had to endure as a child, then reveals how he eventually learned to accept himself as he was, rather than try to conform to other people's expectations. Not merely a tale of overcoming adversity, Learning to Sing also speaks of ways in which he was positively shaped as he recounts experiences with his mother, grandparents, siblings, teachers, friends, and religion. Contrary to expectations, American Idol is barely mentioned in the book.

== Reviews ==
In a Newsweek review (November 22, 2004), David Gates said: "If Aiken were an opera character, he'd be Wagner's Parsifal: the naïf 'made wise by compassion' and armored in his own innocence. He and his co-writer, journalist Allison Glock, have effectively snark-proofed the book by making it totally unguarded...."

Entertainment Weekly reviewer Kristen Baldwin said (November 19, 2004), "Clay Aiken is far more interesting a person than a popstar and, God bless him, he's smart enough to know it. ...Behind the polite narration emerges a complex guy with a folksy sense of humor ('I was teased by other kids like it was their job') and an endearing ambivalence about his own insta-celebrity."

== Later editions ==
The book was republished in paperback edition on November 29, 2005. ISBN 978-0-8129-7410-2 (0-8129-7410-7). An abridged version is also available in audio form read by Aiken himself. There are minor differences between the audio version and the hardcover edition. There is also an unabridged audio version read by Kirby Heyborne. A short excerpt from the audio book is available on Amazon.com. An eBook edition is also available for down load from Random House. ISBN 978-1-58836-453-1.
