= Tried and True =

Studio album by Clay Aiken
- Released: June 1, 2010
- Length: 41:44
- Label: Decca
- Producer: Alex Christensen; David Novik; Quiana Parler

Clay Aiken chronology
Playlist: The Very Best of Clay Aiken (2009)	Tried and True (2010)	Steadfast (2012)

Tried and True is the fifth studio album by American singer Clay Aiken. It was released on June 1, 2010 and marked his debut with Decca Records. The deluxe edition includes two additional tracks plus a second disk with behind the scenes video and a live performance.

== Background ==
Tried and True cotains cover versions of classics from the 1950s and 1960s such as "Unchained Melody" and "Mack the Knife," both of which were performed by Aiken when he was a contestant on American Idol's second season. Aiken called the album a "homecoming in a way, because it's really what I have always wanted to do." In an article written after interviewing Aiken, The News & Observer reported that "the album features a guest turn by saxophonist and label-mate David Sanborn on the Sammy Davis Jr. classic "What Kind of Fool Am I?" [and] Vince Gill performs guitar on Andy Williams' legendary "Moon River"."

== Critical reception ==
Professional ratings
Review scores
Source	Rating
AllMusic	3/5 stars

The album received mixed to positive reviews. Stephen Thomas Erlewine of AllMusic gave the album 3 out of 5 stars, saying "It's handsomely tailored music that fits Aiken's strengths quite well. Indeed, he’s never seemed more at home on a record; nothing may challenge him but he’s never straining, seeming happier singing standards than he did churning out contemporary classics on A Thousand Different Ways, winding up with something that might be the best representation yet of his peculiar charms." Billboard critic Mikael Wood found that "given the cabaret-ready character of Aiken's voice, the change in direction suits the singer. Where he used to sound like an oldster attempting to crash the top 40, here Aiken's vocals exude a relaxed vibe that seemingly reflects his recent stint on Broadway in Spamalot."

USA Today editor Brian Mansfield compared Aiken to singers Perry Como and Johnny Mathis, whose smooth, conservative, and meticulously arranged songs resisted Rock and roll but rarely influenced modern artists. He found that across classics such as "Misty", "Unchained Melod", and "Moon River", Aiken delivers polished, easy-listening interpretations—sometimes transformative, sometimes overly cautious—showcasing his vocal control while updating big-band and traditional pop arrangements for contemporary audiences." Greg Barber from The Washington Post found that a few original songs" on Tried and True, "even with songwriters guiding the music and lyrics, might have provided some illumination. Perry Como and Herman’s Hermits tunes, not so much [...] A departure — aside from a change in record labels — this album is not." He concluded that Aiken's "at his best when the power in his pipes — which are in fine form throughout the disc, despite occasional lapses into a Cowardly Lion-level vibrato — matches the emotion he coveys as he sings them."

== Commercial performance ==
Tried and True sold 22,000 units in its first week of release. It opened at number nine on the US Billboard 200 and number twenty-one on Billboard's Digital Albums. In Canada, the album debuted at number 58 on the Canadian Albums Chart, the lowest debut in Canada for any of his albums.

== Track listing ==
All tracks produced by Alex Christensen.

Tried and True track listing
No.	Title	Writer(s)	Length
1.	"Can't Take My Eyes off You"	Bob Crewe; Bob Gaudio	3:18
2.	"What Kind of Fool Am I?" (featuring David Sanborn)	Leslie Bricusse; Anthony Newley	3:31
3.	"It's Only Make Believe"	Jack Nance; Conway Twitty	3:13
4.	"Misty"	Johnny Burke; Erroll Garner	4:18
5.	"Mack the Knife"	Kurt Weill; Bertolt Brecht; Marc Blitzstein	3:21
6.	"It's Impossible"	Armando Manzanero; Sid Wayne	4:02
7.	"Unchained Melody"	Alex North; Hy Zaret	4:51
8.	"Suspicious Minds"	Mark James	3:49
9.	"Crying" (duet with Linda Eder)	Joe Melson; Roy Orbison	4:05
10.	"There's a Kind of Hush"	Les Reed; Geoff Stephens	3:00
11.	"Moon River" (featuring Vince Gill)	Henry Mancini; Johnny Mercer	4:11
Total length:			41:44

Deluxe edition
No.	Title	Writer(s)	Length
12.	"Who's Sorry Now?"	Bert Kalmar; Harry Ruby; Ted Snyder	3:47
13.	"Breaking Up Is Hard To Do"	Neil Sedaka; Howard Greenfield	2:58

iTunes bonus track
No.	Title	Writer(s)	Length
14.	"You Don't Have to Say You Love Me"	Pino Donaggio; Vito Pallavicini; Vicki Wickham; Simon Napier-Bell	4:12

Deluxe edition – disc 2
No.	Title	Writer(s)	Length
1.	"Behind the Scenes Look: The Making of Tried and True"	Bert Kalmar; Harry Ruby; Ted Snyder	6:22
2.	"Build Me Up Buttercup" (live)	Mike d'Abo; Tony Macaulay	2:59

== Personnel ==
Performers and musicians

- Linda Eder (appears courtesy of The Verve Music Group)
- Vince Gill (appears courtesy of MCA Nashville)
- Dave Sanborn (appears courtesy of Decca Label Group)
- Pete Beachill – Trombone (Tenor)
- Gordon Campbell – Trombone (Tenor)
- Andy Wood – Trombone (Tenor)
- Dave Stewart – Trombone (Bass)
- Andy Mackintosh – Flute, Saxophone (Alto)
- Stan Sulzmann – Flute, Saxophone (Alto)
- Dave Bishop – Clarinet, Saxophone (Tenor)
- Ben Castle – Clarinet, Saxophone (Tenor)
- Jeff Daly – Saxophone (Baritone)
- Mitch Dalton – Guitar
- Mark James – Guitar
- Steve Pearce – Bass (Electric)
- Mark Hodgson – Double Bass
- Martin Gordy – Percussion
- Simon Gardner – Trumpet, Flugelhorn
- Noel Langley – Trumpet, Flugelhorn
- Mike Lovatt – Trumpet, Flugelhorn
- Derek Watkins – Trumpet, Flugelhorn
- Pete Murray – Piano
- Ralph Salmins – Drums
- Quiana Parler – Background vocals, vocal production (Tracks 7 and 11)
- G-Strings Orchestra (Track 9)
- Thomas Bowes – Violin
- Jonathan Rees – Violin
- Vicci Wardman – Violin
- Anthony Pleeth – Cello

Technical

- Chris Walden – Arranger, Conductor, Trumpet, Flugelhorn, Soloist
- Jesse Vargas – Arranger (Tracks 3 and 9)
- Ben Cohn – Arranger (Track 7)
- Carl Marsh – Arranger (Track 11 and 12)
- Alex Christensen – Producer
- Isobel Griffiths – Orchestra Contractor
- Vlado Meller – Mastering
- Jochem van der Saag – Mixing
- Vincent Soyez – Photography
- Dave Novik – Executive Producer, A&R
- Paul Altomari – A&R coordination
- Amy Merxbauer – A&R administration
- Evelyn Morgan – A&R administration
- Tom Arndt – Package Coordinator
- Denise Trotman – Package Design
- Fanny Gotschall – Art Direction

Recording and mixing

- Angel Recording Studios, London, UK
- Home Studios, Hamburg, Germany
- Universal Mastering Studios, New York City, NY
- Additional vocals
  - Soundpure Studios, Durham, NC (Track 7)
  - Strange Cranium Studios, New York City, NY (Track 9)
  - Osceola Studios, Raleigh, NC (Track 11)

== Charts ==
Weekly performance for Tried and True
Chart (2010)	Peak position
Canadian Albums (Billboard)	58
US Billboard 200	9
