= This Is the Night (Clay Aiken song) =

2003 song by Clay Aiken

Single by Clay Aiken
- A-side: "Bridge over Troubled Water"
- Released: June 10, 2003
- Recorded: 2003
- Studio: Rokstone (London, England); Westlake Audio (Los Angeles)
- Genre: Pop
- Length: 3:32
- Label: RCA
- Songwriters: Aldo Nova; Gary Burr; Chris Braide
- Producer: Steve Mac

Clay Aiken singles chronology
"Bridge over Troubled Water" / "This Is the Night" (2003)	"Invisible" (2003)

"This Is the Night" is a song by American Idol second season contestant Clay Aiken, written by Chris Braide, Aldo Nova, and Gary Burr. It was released as his debut single on June 10, 2003, on the RCA label, simultaneously with "Flying Without Wings" by rival contestant (and idol winner) Ruben Studdard. It became the 11th song in the history of the Billboard Hot 100 (and the first by a debut act) to debut at number one on that chart, restricting "Flying Without Wings" to the number-two position.

Internationally, "This Is the Night" was issued as a double A-side with Aiken's cover of Simon & Garfunkel's "Bridge over Troubled Water" in Canada and New Zealand, reaching number one in both countries. In both nations, the double A-side also kept "Flying Without Wings" from reaching the top spot.

== Writing and inspiration ==
Although the song seems tailor-made as a potential show-winning song, it was not written specifically for American Idol. Co-writer Braide said in an interview with HitQuarters: "'This Is The Night' was written from the heart ... It was written after 9/11, and there's a line in it, 'Every kiss is a kiss/you can never get back', and it's about saying, to whoever you love out there, just appreciate them." American Idol creator Simon Fuller heard the song and said it was perfect for the show.

== Release and chart performance ==
"Bridge over Trouble Water" / "This Is the Night" was released as a CD single and 7-inch single in the United States on June 10, 2003. Because of Billboard's chart rules, only "This Is the Night" was listed on the Hot 100 chart since it received the highest cumulative airplay audience, appearing on the Billboard Adult Contemporary chart at number 30 and climbing to a peak of number 13 in August 2003. On June 28, 2003, "This Is the Night" debuted at number one on the Hot 100 with sales of 393,000, becoming the fastest-selling physical single since Elton John's "Candle in the Wind 1997" and the best-selling physical single of 2003, with 948,000 copies sold. It was also the first song by a debut act to top the Hot 100 during its first week on the chart.

On July 15, 2003, the double A-side single was certified platinum by the Recording Industry Association of America (RIAA), becoming the first CD single to go platinum since 2002, when Lee Ann Womack's "I Hope You Dance" sold a million copies over a year after its release. The double A-side also topped the charts in New Zealand, where it is certified platinum, and in Canada, going six-times platinum. "This Is the Night" was included as a bonus track on Clay Aiken's Measure of a Man album.

== Credits and personnel ==
Credits are lifted from the US CD single liner notes.

Studios

- Recorded at Rokstone Studios (London, England) and Westlake Audio (Los Angeles)
- Mixed at Mix This! (Pacific Palisades, California)
- Mastered at Sterling Sound (Chelsea, New York City)

Personnel

- Aldo Nova – writing
- Gary Burr – writing
- Chris Braide – writing
- Friðrik "Frizzy" Karlsson – guitars
- Steve Pearce – bass
- Steve Mac – keyboards, production
- Vinnie Colaiuta – drums
- Frank Ricotti – percussion
- Dave Arch – production
- Chris Laws – recording (Rokstone)
- Robin Sellars – recording (Westlake Audio)
- Bob Clearmountain – mixing
- Kevin Harp – assistant mix engineering
- Daniel Pursey – assistant engineering
- Jason Rankins – assistant engineering
- Clive Davis – executive production
- Ted Jensen – mastering

== Charts ==
=== Weekly charts ===
Chart (2003)	Peak position
Canada (Nielsen SoundScan) with "Bridge over Troubled Water"	1
New Zealand (Recorded Music NZ) with "Bridge over Troubled Water"	1
US Billboard Hot 100	1
US Adult Contemporary (Billboard)	13

=== Year-end charts ===
Chart (2003)	Position
New Zealand (RIANZ)	38
US Billboard Hot 100	47
US Adult Contemporary (Billboard)	33

== Certifications ==
Region	Certification	Certified units/sales
Canada (Music Canada)	6× Platinum	60,000^{^}
New Zealand (RMNZ)	Platinum	10,000^{*}
United States (RIAA)	Platinum	960,000
^{*} Sales figures based on certification alone.^{^} Shipments figures based on certification alone.

== See also ==
- List of Hot 100 number-one singles of 2003 (U.S.)
