= The Way/Solitaire =

2004 single by Clay Aiken

"The Way" / "Solitaire"

Single by Clay Aiken
- Released: March 16, 2004
- Length: 4:07 ("The Way"); 5:27 ("Solitaire")
- Label: RCA; BMG; 19; S
- Songwriters: Steve Morales, Enrique Iglesias, Kara DioGuardi, David Siegel ("The Way"); Neil Sedaka, Phil Cody ("Solitaire")
- Producers: Steve Morales ("The Way"); Steve Mac ("Solitaire")

Clay Aiken singles chronology
"Invisible" (2003)	"The Way" / "Solitaire" (2004)	"I Will Carry You" (2004)

"The Way" and "Solitaire" are two songs by American singer turned politician Clay Aiken, released as a double A-side single on March 16, 2004. "The Way" is an original song while "Solitaire" is a cover of the 1972 song written by Neil Sedaka and Phil Cody. "The Way" was written by Steve Morales, Enrique Iglesias, Kara DioGuardi, and David Siegel and was produced by Morales, while "Solitaire" was produced by Steve Mac.

On the US Billboard Hot 100 chart, the single charted as "Solitaire" alone due to the song receiving more downloads than "The Way", and it debuted at its peak of number four, selling 100,500 physical copies and 3,500 downloads during its first week (compared to "The Way", which sold 2,000 downloads). In Canada, both songs were listed on the Canadian Singles Chart; the single debuted at number one, giving Aiken his second number-one hit in Canada.

== Music video ==
"The Way" music video was directed by Diane Martel. Instead of the traditional Hollywood types, Aiken hired everyday people to play the couples shown in the video.

== Charts ==
Chart (2004)	Peak position
Canada (Nielsen SoundScan)	1
US Billboard Hot 100 "Solitaire" only	4
US Adult Contemporary (Billboard) "Solitaire" only	27

== Release history ==
Region	Version	Date	Format(s)	Label(s)	Ref.
United States	"The Way"	February 2, 2004	Contemporary hit radio	RCA; BMG; 19; S	
United States	"The Way" / "Solitaire"	March 16, 2004	CD	RCA; BMG; 19; S	
United States	"The Way"	March 22, 2004	Adult contemporary radio	RCA; BMG; 19; S	
United States	"Solitaire"	April 12, 2004	Adult contemporary radio	RCA; BMG; 19; S	
