= Invisible (D-Side song) =

2003 single by D-Side

Single by D-Side

from the album Stronger Together
- B-side: "Fallen for You"; "Bring You Out"
- Released: 14 July 2003
- Genre: Pop
- Length: 3:41
- Label: WEA; Blacklist; Edel
- Songwriters: Desmond Child; Andreas Carlsson; Chris Braide
- Producers: Desmond Child; Andreas Carlsson; Chris Braide

D-Side singles chronology
"Speechless" (2003)	"Invisible" (2003)	"Real World" (2003)

Audio
- "Invisible" on YouTube

"Invisible" is a song by Irish boy band D-Side, released as the third single (second in the United Kingdom) from their first studio album, Stronger Together (2003). The song was written and produced by Desmond Child, Andreas Carlsson, and Chris Braide. Released on 14 July 2003, the song became a top-10 hit in Ireland and the United Kingdom. The same year, American Idol second two runner-up Clay Aiken covered the song and reached number 37 on the US Billboard Hot 100 with his rendition. The song has been frequently targeted by music critics for its unsettling lyrical content, with several calling the track a "stalkers' anthem".

== Release and reception ==
D-Side's version of "Invisible" was released on 14 July 2003 in the United Kingdom across three formats: two CD singles and a cassette single. Can't Stop the Pop called it a "meticulously crafted" track, praising its composition, the band's vocals, and its airplay appeal, but criticised the lyrical content for being too "creepy", noting that the chorus has aged poorly. Commercially, "Invisible" became the group's third consecutive top-10 hit in their home country, debuting and peaking at number five on the Irish Singles Chart on 17 July. At the end of 2003, the song was placed at number 73 on Ireland's year-end chart. On 20 July, the single appeared at number seven on the UK Singles Chart, becoming D-Side's highest-charting single in the UK and staying in the top 100 for six weeks. In Japan, the song was issued as a CD single on 28 July 2004.

== Track listings ==
UK and European CD1

1. "Invisible" (radio edit)
2. "Fallen for You"
3. "Bring You Out"
4. "Invisible" (radio edit video)

UK CD2

1. "Invisible" (radio edit)
2. "Invisible" (Lifestylerz radio edit)
3. "Invisible" (Lifestylerz dub)
4. "Invisible" (Lifestylerz radio edit video)

UK cassette single and European CD2

1. "Invisible" (radio edit)
2. "Fallen for You"

Japanese CD single

1. "Invisible" (radio edit)
2. "Fallen for You"
3. "Bring You Out"
4. "Invisible" (Lifestylerz radio edit)

== Personnel ==
Personnel are lifted from the UK CD1 liner notes.

- Desmond Child – writing, production
- Andreas Carlsson – writing, production
- Chris Braide – writing, production
- D-Side – vocals
- Carlos Alvarez – mixing

== Charts ==
=== Weekly charts ===
Chart (2003)	Peak position
Europe (Eurochart Hot 100)	21
Ireland (IRMA)	5
Scottish Singles Sales (Official Charts)	6
UK Singles (Official Charts)	7
UK Airplay (Music Week)	38

=== Year-end charts ===
Chart (2003)	Position
Ireland (IRMA)	73

== Release history ==
Region	Date	Format(s)	Label(s)	Ref.
United Kingdom	14 July 2003	CD; cassette	WEA; Blacklist; Edel	
Japan	28 July 2004	CD	Avex Trax; Blacklist; Edel	

== Clay Aiken version ==
"Invisible"

Single by Clay Aiken

from the album Measure of a Man
- B-side: "Measure of a Man"
- Released: 29 September 2003
- Recorded: 2003
- Studio: The Gentlemen's Club, The Gallery (Miami, Florida); Storm (Stockholm, Sweden); Red Door (St. Davids, Pennsylvania); Master Mix (Minneapolis, Minnesota)
- Length: 4:03
- Label: RCA
- Songwriters: Desmond Child; Andreas Carlsson; Chris Braide
- Producer: Desmond Child

Clay Aiken singles chronology
"Bridge over Troubled Water" / "This Is the Night" (2003)	"Invisible" (2003)	"The Way" / "Solitaire" (2004)

Music video
- "Invisible" on YouTube

After finishing as runner-up to the second season of American Idol, Clay Aiken covered the song for his debut studio album, Measure of a Man, and released it as the album's lead single. This version was produced by Child only and contains an extended bridge. Released two months after D-Side's version, Aiken's cover charted within the top 40 of the US Billboard Hot 100, peaking at number 37 in January 2004. It also charted in New Zealand, reaching number 47 in December 2003.

=== Background and release ===
Aiken recorded his vocals before D-Side had released their version in the UK. He first went to Child's studio in Miami, when American Idol season two winner Ruben Studdard chided Aiken for wanting to record in a dark studio and not explore the city. After recording the rest of the demo in Minneapolis, Aiken and his coworkers discovered that D-Side had released their version, so they discussed whether to issue the song in the UK. The team decided that the song was too good to defer, and they eventually released the song in the United States on 29 September 2003. In an interview with Billboard, Aiken stated that he wanted to amend the track's lyrics, but he believed that the content could have been much worse and decided to tone down the disturbing message with the video, calling the lyrical content "nasty" and encouraging people not to partake in stalking.

=== Critical reception ===
In 2004, Blender magazine ranked Aiken's version of "Invisible" at number 11 on their list of the "50 Worst Songs Ever", calling it a "disturbing voyeur fantasy" and noting that its worst lyric is "I wish you could touch me with the colors of your life". Matt Keohan of online lifestyle publication BroBible called the song the "creepiest song ever made", referring to it as "The Stalkers' Anthem". The Baltimore Sun also called the track a "stalker anthem". In 2020, Return of Rock ranked the song as Aiken's best, calling his voice "beautiful".

=== Chart performance ===
In the United States, "Invisible" debuted at number 57 on the Billboard Hot 100 in late November 2003. The song remained on the Hot 100 for 20 issues, reaching its peak of number 37 during its ninth week on the chart. The song entered the top 10 on the Adult Contemporary ranking, peaking at number eight, and charted with the top 30 of the Adult Top 40 and Mainstream Top 40 listings. "Invisible" was also released in New Zealand, where "Bridge over Troubled Water" / "This Is the Night" had topped the chart. It appeared on the country's RIANZ Singles Chart for two nonconsecutive weeks in December 2003, peaking at number 47 on both occasions.

=== Credits and personnel ===
Credits are lifted from the Measure of a Man album booklet.

Studios

- Recorded at The Gentlemen's Club, The Gallery (Miami, Florida), Storm Studios (Stockholm, Sweden), Red Door Recording Studios (St. Davids, Pennsylvania), and Master Mix Studios (Minneapolis, Minnesota)
- Mixed at Mix This! (Pacific Palisades, Los Angeles)
- Mastered at The Hit Factory (New York City)

Personnel

- Desmond Child – writing, production
- Andreas Carlsson – writing, background vocals, guitar
- Chris Braide – writing, background vocals
- Clay Aiken – vocals, backing vocals
- Chris Willis – background vocals
- Dan Warner – guitar
- Eric Bazilian – guitar, recording
- Marcus Englöf – acoustic guitar, keyboards, programming, recording
- Esbjörn Öhrwall – acoustic guitar
- Thomas Blindberg – bass
- Doug Emery – piano
- Samuel Waermö – keyboards, programming, percussion, recording
- Lee Levin – drums
- Brian Coleman – production management
- Jules Gondar – recording
- Carlos Alvarez – recording
- Craig Lozowick – recording
- Bob Clearmountain – mixing
- Kevin Harp – assistant mix engineering
- Joe Yannece – mastering

=== Charts ===
==== Weekly charts ====
Chart (2003–2004)	Peak position
New Zealand (Recorded Music NZ)	47
US Billboard Hot 100	37
US Adult Contemporary (Billboard)	8
US Adult Pop Airplay (Billboard)	25
US Pop Airplay (Billboard)	14

==== Year-end charts ====
Chart (2004)	Position
US Adult Contemporary (Billboard)	23
US Adult Top 40 (Billboard)	72
US Mainstream Top 40 (Billboard)	82

=== Certifications ===
Region	Certification	Certified units/sales
United States (RIAA)	Gold	500,000^{*}
^{*} Sales figures based on certification alone.

=== Release history ===
Region	Date	Format(s)	Label(s)	Ref.
United States	29 September 2003	Adult contemporary; contemporary hit radio	RCA	
United States	1 November 2003	Digital download	RCA	
United States	16 December 2003	7-inch vinyl	RCA	
