= Merry Christmas with Love =

Studio album by Clay Aiken
- Released: November 16, 2004
- Studios: Right Track Recording (New York); Sound Decision (New York); Chalice Studios (Los Angeles); Hit Factory (New York)
- Genre: Pop
- Length: 39:00
- Label: RCA
- Producers: Phil Ramone; Walter Afanasieff

Clay Aiken chronology
Measure of a Man (2003)	Merry Christmas with Love (2004)	A Thousand Different Ways (2006)

Merry Christmas with Love is the first Christmas album and second studio album by American recording artist Clay Aiken. It was released on November 16, 2004, through RCA Records. The album consists of twelve tracks, featuring eleven cover versions of Christmas standards and carols and a medley consisting of "Hark! The Herald Angels Sing" and "O Come All Ye Faithful." Production on Merry Christmas with Love was overseen by Phil Ramone and Walter Afanasieff.

The album debuted at number four on the US Billboard 200 chart, selling 270,000 copies in its first week. It was recognized by Billboard as the best-selling Christmas/holiday album of 2004 and the best-selling Christian album of 2005. In January 2005, Merry Christmas with Love was certified platinum by the Recording Industry Association of America (RIAA) in January 2005. The album was re-released on August 18, 2009, on the Sony label.

== Promotion ==
Aiken has toured four times to promote this album. In late 2004, Aiken embarked on The Joyful Noise Tour, a 28-city holiday concert tour that ran from November through December. Each performance lasted approximately two hours and featured 30-piece orchestras, along with adult and children’s choirs recruited from each host city. The tour's official sponsor was Ronald McDonald House Charities. Aiken returned the following year with The Joyful Noise 2005 Tour, a 36-city, 40-concert tour across the United States and Canada from November to December 2005. In addition to musical performances, the concerts incorporated a theatrical element featuring a traveling cast of actors, singers, and dancers, supplemented by supporting performers from each host city. Pop-classical pianist William Joseph served as the opening act and contributed musically to the tour.

In December 2006, Aiken launched a Holiday Tour that visited 18 cities, primarily in the eastern United States. Performances were accompanied by local orchestras, which also opened each concert with a selection of seasonal music. Aiken’s 2007 holiday tour, Christmas in the Heartland, consisted of 21 dates and focused on the eastern United States. The tour began on November 26 in Wichita, Kansas, and concluded on December 22 in Merrillville, Indiana. Local orchestras accompanied the performances. Holiday stories submitted by fans were incorporated into the show and read aloud as introductions to four song selections. Aiken traditionally concluded his Christmas tours with his signature holiday song, "Don’t Save It All for Christmas Day."

== Critical reception ==
Professional ratings
Review scores
Source	Rating
AllMusic	3/5 stars
Entertainment Weekly	D

AllMusic editor Stephen Thomas Erlewine felt that "Aiken turns in a good holiday album. Actually, there are no surprises on the album — the song selections are all standards, the arrangements are traditional and unobtrusive, always emphasizing Clay's voice, and the record is given a safe, high-gloss sheen ideal for adult contemporary radio. If there are any surprises with Merry Christmas with Love[...] it's that his singing is better, more assured here than it was on Measure of a Man."

Rolling Stone's Jolie Lash wrote: "There's more of Aiken's intense tenor that won fans over on the show, as he takes on "Mary, Did You Know," and "The Christmas Song," at times cutting a path somewhere between Andy Williams and Josh Groban. At others though, like on "Silent Night," things sound more akin to a live recording of the TV show, as Aiken's phrasing ends up stuttered, like he's missed a line — joining the backing choir after a verse has already started. As he hits the upbeat "Winter Wonderland," the lanky twenty-something reins things in for the finale, singing each note as perfect as if it were a Disney special".

== Awards and nominations ==
Year	Ceremony	Category	Result
2004	Billboard Music Awards	Best Selling Christmas Album	Won
2005	American Christian Music Awards	Outstanding Yule CD	Won
2005	Billboard Music Awards	Best Selling Christmas Album	Won

== Commercial performance ==
Merry Christmas with Love debuted at number four on the US Billboard 200 chart, selling 270,000 copies in its first week. This became Aiken's second US top-ten debut. By the end of 2004, the album sold 1,004,000 copies. The album set a new record for fastest-selling holiday album in the SoundScan era (since March 1991) and tied Celine Dion's record for the highest debut by a holiday album in the history of Billboard magazine. On January 6, 2005, the album was certified platinum by the Recording Industry Association of America (RIAA) for sales of over a million copies. As of February 2011, the album has sold 1.4 million copies in the United States.

== Track listing ==
Merry Christmas with Love track listing
No.	Title	Writer(s)	Producer(s)	Length
1.	"O Holy Night"	Adolphe Adam; John Sullivan Dwight	Walter Afanasieff	3:38
2.	"Winter Wonderland"	Richard B. Smith; Felix Bernard	Phil Ramone	2:49
3.	"Silent Night"	Franz Xaver Gruber; Joseph Mohr	Ramone	2:17
4.	"Medley: Hark! The Herald Angels Sing / O Come All Ye Faithful"	Felix Mendelssohn; Charles Wesley/; Frederick Oakeley; John Francis Wade	Afanasieff	4:00
5.	"Have Yourself a Merry Little Christmas"	Hugh Martin; Ralph Blane	Ramone	3:27
6.	"Mary, Did You Know?"	Buddy Greene; Mark Lowry	Afanasieff	3:20
7.	"Joy to the World"	Isaac Watts; Lowell Mason	Ramone	2:13
8.	"The Christmas Song"	Melvin Tormé; Robert Wells	Ramone	2:36
9.	"Don't Save It All for Christmas Day"	Celine Dion; Ric Wake; Peter Zizzo	Afanasieff	4:33
10.	"Merry Christmas with Love"	Greg Wayne Davis; Billy Smiley	Afanasieff	4:04
11.	"Sleigh Ride"	Leroy Anderson; Mitchell Parish	Ramone	3:00
12.	"What Are You Doing New Year's Eve?"	Frank Loesser	Ramone	3:01
Total length:				39:00

== Personnel ==
Performers and musicians

* Allan Schwartzberg – drums
- Vinnie Colaiuta – drums
- David Finck – bass
- Nathan East – bass
- Ira Siegel – acoustic guitar
- Jeff Mironov – guitar
- Mike Landau – electric guitar
- Kenny Ascher – piano
- Steve Ferrera – harp, percussion
- Walter Afanasieff – keyboard
- Conesha Mone't – background vocals
- Quiana Parler – background vocals
- Jacob Juttrell – background vocals
- Angela Fisher – background vocals
- Michael McElroy – background vocals
- Clarke Anderson – background vocals
- Darryl Phinnesse – background vocals
- The McCrary Choir – background vocals
- Broadway Inspirational Voices – background vocals
  - Kate Coffman – soprano
  - Laura Dean – soprano
  - Tanesha Gary – soprano
  - Catrice Joseph-Hart – soprano
  - Gerti Lee James – soprano
  - Bertilla Baker – alto
  - Tracy Nicole Chapman – alto
  - La-Rita Gaskins – alto
  - Lucia Giannetta – alto
  - Danielle Lee Greaves – alto
  - Maurice Lauchner – tenor
  - John Eric Parker – tenor
  - Glenn Rainey – tenor
  - Eliseo Roman – tenor
  - Christopher Zelno – tenor

Technical

- Andy Zulla – mixing
- Joel Moss – recording
- Mark Valentine – additional recording
- Emanuel Kiriakou – engineer
- Joe Wohlmuth – additional engineering
- David Channing – additional engineering
- Jay Spears – assistant engineer
- Mike Schroffel – assistant engineer
- Glenn Pittman – assistant engineer
- Alex Rodriguez – assistant engineer
- Dave Reitzas – lead vocal engineer
- Jorge Calandrelli – arrangement
- Patrick Williams – arrangement
- Rich Davis – production coordination
- Elena Barere – concert master
- Torrie Zito – conductor
- William Ross – conductor, arranger
- Humberto Gatica – orchestra engineer
- Sandy Decrescent – orchestra contractor
- David Lowe – orchestra contractor
- Jill Dell'Abate production manager
- Joe Yannece – mastering

== Charts ==
=== Weekly charts ===
Weekly performance for Merry Christmas with Love
Chart (2004)	Peak position
US Billboard 200	4
US Top Christian Albums (Billboard)	1
US Top Holiday Albums (Billboard)	1

=== Year-end charts ===
Year-end performance for Merry Christmas with Love
Chart (2005)	Position
US Billboard 200	52

== Certifications ==
Certifications for Merry Christmas with Love
Region	Certification	Certified units/sales
Canada (Music Canada)	Gold	50,000^{^}
United States (RIAA)	Platinum	1,370,000
^{^} Shipments figures based on certification alone.

== See also ==
- List of Billboard Top Holiday Albums number ones of the 2000s
