= Measure of a Man (Clay Aiken album) =

Studio album by Clay Aiken
- Released: October 14, 2003
- Studios: The Gentlemen's Club, Icon Sound Studios and The Gallery Recording Studios (Miami, Florida); Red Door Recording Studios (St. David, Pennsylvania); Master Mix Studios (Minneapolis, Minnesota); Sound Decision (New York City, New York); Blue Iron Gate Studios (Santa Monica, California); Westlake Studios, The Chill Building and Mix This! (Los Angeles, California); NRG Studios (Hollywood, California); Larrabee Sound Studios (North Hollywood, California); Storm Studios and Khabang Studio (Stockholm, Sweden); Stereo Studio 1 (Olso, Norway); Rokstone Studios and Metropolis Studios (London, UK)
- Genre: Pop
- Length: 46:30
- Label: RCA
- Producers: Clive Davis (exec.); Desmond Child; David Eriksen; Steve Mac; Clif Magness; Steve Morales; Rick Nowels

Clay Aiken chronology
Measure of a Man (2003)	Merry Christmas with Love (2004)

Measure of a Man is the debut album by American singer Clay Aiken. It was released on October 14, 2003, through RCA Records, five months after the conclusion of the second season of American Idol, in which he finished as the runner-up. Executive produced by Clive Davis, Aiken worked with a variety of producers on the album, including Desmond Child, David Eriksen, Steve Mac, Clif Magness, James McMillan, Steve Morales, and Rick Nowels.

Critical reception towards Measure of a Man ranged from strongly positive to scathingly negative. The album debuted at number one on the US Billboard 200 chart, selling 613,000 copies in its first week. It also held the number one spot for two consecutive weeks. In November 2003, Measure of a Man was certified double platinum by the Recording Industry Association of America (RIAA). The album was supported by three singles: "Invisible", ""The Way"/"Solitaire", and "I Will Carry You".

== Promotion ==
"Invisible" was released as the first single from Measure of a Man. It was initially released as a promo-only single in September 2003, and only became available as digital downloads much later. The song peaked at number eight on the US Billboard Adult Contemporary and at number 37 on the US Billboard Hot 100 on January 6, 2004. It was later certified gold for digital downloads by the RIAA on March 31, 2006. A music video for "Invisible", directed by Diane Martel, was shot in Hollywood at Hollywood & Highland, a major outdoor shopping center and tourist attraction, where Aiken invited 800 fans to be part of the crowd scene in the video. "The Way"/"Solitaire" was released as the album second single on March 16, 2004. "The Way" peaked at number one on the Canadian Singles Chart. A music video for the song was again directed by Martel. "I Will Carry You," the third single from Measure of a Man, peaked at number 25 on the US Adult Contemporary chart.

== Critical reception ==
Professional ratings
Review scores
Source	Rating
AllMusic	3/5 stars
Blender	2/5 stars
Entertainment Weekly	C
Now	2/5 Ns
Rolling Stone	2/5 stars
Slant Magazine	1/5 stars
The Village Voice	D

AllMusic editor Stephen Thomas Erlewine felt that "Clay's earnest delivery—somewhat sweet and expertly coached—gives these songs a bit of innocence and believability, but the slickness of the whole enterprise overshadows his voice, particularly because his voice isn't all that remarkable on record [..] Even so, it's perfectly suited for this safe MOR album, and while none of the songs really catch hold, it doesn't matter since the sound of the record is pleasant and perfect for radio." Similarly, Jon Caramanica from Rolling Stone called the album a "school of middle-of-the-road bombast."

Entertainment Weekly's David Browne wrote that "from his earnest, emotive voice to the music that surrounds it, Measure of a Man works at pleasing [Aiken's] legions with relentless, machine-tooled precision." He found that the album was "less oversung and overarranged than Kelly Clarkson's” Thankful; Aiken avoids the melisma overkill common to the other Idol finalists. But he and his handlers also avoid anything remotely audacious or saucy [...] Clearly, Aiken wants to differentiate himself from the Christinas and Justins of the world." Now editor Nick Flanagan concluded: "If you like soft pop that has had every single angle retouched, airbrushed and perfected for maximum K-Mart sales, this is the record of the year, although it'll be runner-up if Ruben Studdard releases something."

=== Awards and nominations ===
Year	Ceremony	Category	Title	Result
2003	Billboard Music Awards	Best Selling Single	"This Is The Night"	Won

== Commercial performance ==
Measure of a Man debuted at number one on the US Billboard 200 chart, selling 613,000 copies in its first week. This became Aiken's first US number one debut. This was also the highest-selling debut for a solo artist since Snoop Dogg's Doggystyle in December 1993. In its second week, the album remained at number one on the chart, selling an additional 225,000 copies. In its third week, the album fell to number three on the chart, selling 141,000 more copies. In its fourth week, the album fell to number eight on the chart, selling 113,000 copies, bringing its four-week total to 1.1 million copies. On November 17, 2003, the album was certified double platinum by the Recording Industry Association of America (RIAA) for shipments of over two million copies. As of February 2011, the album has sold 2.8 million copies in the United States.

== Track listing ==
Measure of a Man track listing
No.	Title	Writer(s)	Producer(s)	Length
1.	"Invisible"	Chris Braide; Andreas Carlsson; Desmond Child	Child	4:03
2.	"I Will Carry You"	Lindy Robbins; Dennis Matkosky; Jess Cates	Clif Magness	3:44
3.	"The Way"	Steve Morales; Enrique Iglesias; Kara DioGuardi; David Siegel	Morales	4:06
4.	"When You Say You Love Me"	Darren Hayes; Rick Nowels	Nowels	4:07
5.	"No More Sad Songs"	Jimmy Harry; Wayne Hector; Sheppard Solomon	Magness	4:01
6.	"Run to Me"	Chris Braide; Child; Gary Burr	Child	3:33
7.	"Shine"	Robbins; Pete Gordeno; Reed Vertelney	Magness	4:09
8.	"I Survived You"	Cates; Ty Lacy; Jeff Franzel	Magness	3:34
9.	"This Is the Night" (bonus cut)	Chris Braide; Burr; Aldo Nova	Steve Mac	3:32
10.	"Perfect Day"	Harry; Solomon; Danielle Brisebois	Magness	3:52
11.	"Measure of a Man"	Morales; Cathy Dennis; David Siegel	Morales	3:58
12.	"Touch"	Dennis; David Eriksen	Eriksen	3:51
Total length:				46:30

Digital edition
No.	Title	Writer(s)	Producer(s)	Length
9.	"Solitaire" (bonus cut)	Neil Sedaka; Phil Cody	Mac	5:27
10.	"Perfect Day"	Harry; Solomon; Brisebois	Magness	3:52
11.	"Measure of a Man"	Morales; Dennis; Siegel	Morales	3:58
12.	"Touch"	Dennis; Eriksen	Eriksen	3:51

Japanese edition – bonus tracks
No.	Title	Writer(s)	Producer(s)	Length
13.	"On the Wings of Love"	Jeffrey Osborne; Peter Harrison Schless	James McMillan	3:47
14.	"Bridge Over Troubled Water"	Paul Simon	Nigel Wright	4:00

== Personnel ==
Performers and musicians

- Clay Aiken – vocals, backing vocals (12)
- Doug Emery – acoustic piano (1, 6), keyboards (6), programming (6), string arrangements (6)
- Marcus Engölf – keyboards (1), programming (1), acoustic guitars (1)
- Samuel Waermö – keyboards (1), programming (1), percussion (1)
- Clif Magness – acoustic piano (2, 5, 7, 8, 10), keyboards (2, 5, 7, 8, 10), programming (2, 5, 7, 8, 10), acoustic guitars (2, 5, 7, 8, 10), electric guitars (2, 5, 7, 8, 10), bass (2, 5, 7, 8, 10), backing vocals (2, 7, 10), arrangements (2, 5, 7, 8, 10)
- David Siegel – keyboards (3, 11)
- Charles Judge – keyboards (4)
- Greg Kurstin – keyboards (4)
- Rick Nowels – keyboards (4), acoustic guitars (4), bouzouki (4), arrangements (4)
- David Arch – keyboards (9)
- Steve Mac – keyboards (9)
- David Eriksen – keyboard programming (12), drum programming (12), arrangements (12)
- Martin Sjølie – additional keyboards (12)
- Esbjörn Öhrwall – acoustic guitars (1)
- Eric Bazilian – guitars (1)
- Andreas Carlsson – guitars (1), backing vocals (1)
- Dan Warner – guitars (1, 6), acoustic guitars (3), electric guitars (3, 11), bass (6)
- Tim Pierce – guitars (4)
- Fridrik Karlsson – guitars (9)
- Eivind Aarset – guitars (12)
- Børge Petersen-Øverleir – guitars (12)
- Thomas Blindberg – bass (1)
- Chris Garcia – bass (4)
- John Pierce – bass (4)
- Steve Pearce – bass (9)
- Lee Levin – drums (1, 6)
- Tim Klassen – drums (2, 5)
- Wayne Rodrigues – drums (4), programming (4)
- Josh Freese – drums (7, 8, 10)
- Vinnie Colaiuta – drums (9)
- Frank Ricotti – percussion (9)
- Rune Arnesen – percussion (12)
- Christopher Glansdorp – cello (6)
- Steve Morales – arrangements (3, 11)
- Chris Braide – backing vocals (1)
- Chris Willis – backing vocals (1, 6)
- Heath Burgett – backing vocals (3)
- Marc Nelson – backing vocals (3)
- Maria Vidal – backing vocals (4)
- Danielle Brisebois – backing vocals (5, 8)
- Håkon Iverson – backing vocals (12)
- Marian Lisland – backing vocals (12)

Production

- Clive Davis – album producer
- Stephen Ferrera – A&R
- Desmond Child – producer (1, 6)
- Clif Magness – producer (2, 5, 7, 8, 10)
- Steve Morales – producer (3, 11)
- Rick Nowels – producer (4)
- David Eriksen – producer (12)
- Brian Coleman – production manager (1, 6)
- Kristin Johnson – production coordinator (4)
- Tara Saremi – production manager (4)
- Frank Harkins – art direction
- Kevin Hess – photography
- Simon Fuller – management

Technical

- Joe Yannace – mastering at Hit Factory Mastering (New York, NY)
- Carlos Alvarez – recording (1, 6)
- Eric Bazilian – recording (1)
- Marcus Engölf – recording (1)
- Jules Gondar – recording (1, 6)
- Craig Lozowick – recording (1, 6)
- Samuel Waermö – recording (1)
- Clif Magness – engineer (2, 5, 7, 8, 10)
- Shane Stoner – recording (3, 11)
- Chris Garcia – recording (4)
- Kieran Menzies – recording (4)
- Alan Veucasovic – recording (4)
- Chris Laws – recording (9)
- Robin Sellars – recording (9)
- David Eriksen – recording (12)
- Richard Wilkinson – recording (12)
- Bob Clearmountain – mixing (1, 2, 5–10)
- Serban Ghenea – mixing (3)
- Manny Marroquin – mixing (4)
- Andy Zulla – mixing (11)
- Niklas Flyckt – mixing (12)
- Conrad Golding – assistant engineer (1)
- Orlando Hall – assistant engineer (1, 6)
- James Harley – assistant engineer (1, 6)
- Greg Landon – assistant engineer (1, 6)
- Sean Samaroo – assistant engineer (1, 6)
- Kevin Harp – assistant mix engineer (1, 6, 9)
- Fox Phelps – assistant engineer (2, 5, 7, 8, 10)
- Cesar Ramirez – assistant engineer (2, 5, 7, 8, 10)
- Jesse Rogg – assistant engineer (4)
- Daniel Pursey – assistant engineer (9)
- Jason Rankins – assistant engineer (9)
- Martin Sjølie – assistant engineer (12)
- Jonas Östman – assistant mix engineer (12)
- Ed Williams – additional lead vocal engineer (3), recording (11)
- Cameron Webb – additional editing (2, 5, 7, 8, 10)
- Gustavo Celis – Pro Tools editing (3)

== Charts ==
=== Weekly charts ===
Weekly performance for Measure of a Man
Chart (2003–2004)	Peak position
Canadian Albums (Billboard)	2
New Zealand Albums (RMNZ)	9
Singaporean Albums (RIAS)	1
US Billboard 200	1

=== Year-end charts ===
2003 year-end performance for Measure of a Man
Chart (2003)	Position
US Billboard 200	53
Worldwide Albums (IFPI)	27

2004 year-end performance for Measure of a Man
Chart (2004)	Position
US Billboard 200	43

== Certifications ==
Certifications for Measure of a Man
Region	Certification	Certified units/sales
Canada (Music Canada)	Platinum	100,000^{^}
United States (RIAA)	2× Platinum	2,800,000
^{^} Shipments figures based on certification alone.
