= A Thousand Different Ways =

Studio album by Clay Aiken
- Released: September 19, 2006
- Length: 55:34
- Labels: RCA; 19
- Producers: John Fields; Jaymes Foster

Clay Aiken chronology
Merry Christmas with Love (2004)	A Thousand Different Ways (2006)	All Is Well (2006)

Singles from A Thousand Different Ways
- 1. "Without You" Released: September 2006; 2. "A Thousand Days" Released: January 2007

A Thousand Different Ways is the third studio album by Clay Aiken. It was released by RCA Records on September 19, 2006. The album, which was executive produced by Jaymes Foster, consists of ten covers and four new songs. The first single was "Without You" and the second, "A Thousand Days."

== Background ==
Writers of the four new songs ("These Open Arms", "Lonely No More", "A Thousand Days" and "Everything I Have") include Jon Bon Jovi, Desmond Child, Andreas Carlsson, Jeremy Bose, Aldo Nova, Samuel Waermo, Mimmi Waermo, and Aiken himself. "These Open Arms" previously appeared as a bonus track on the Japanese issue Bon Jovi's 2005 album Have a Nice Day. "Broken Wings," the last cut on the album and an original poem written by Erin Taylor, was woven throughout the lyrics. The last line of this poem which is also the last line added to the song lyrics became the album title. Available only through iTunes as a bonus cut when the complete album is downloaded, is a fifth new song titled "Lover All Alone". Aiken wrote the lyrics and David Foster wrote the music. Kmart offered for a limited time (as a download) an exclusive bonus recording of "If You Don't Know Me by Now".

== Critical reception ==
Professional ratings
Review scores
Source	Rating
About.com	3/5 stars
AllMusic	2.5/5 stars
Entertainment Weekly	D
Rolling Stone	1/5 stars

Bill Lamb from About.com found that "there are gems here, but this album is unlikely to hold the attention of the casual listener all the way through. Clay Aiken fans will find much to like here, but he needs to start thinking about how to reach toward a broader audience and catch their attention. A number of ingredients for long-term pop stardom are evident, but A Thousand Different Ways is merely a holding pattern on the pathway there." AllMusic critic Stephen Thomas Erlewine concluded that on A Thousand Different Ways, Aiken "sounds exactly how you remember him from TV, which only means that he must have been scared that he'd lose those legions of fans he won way back then. And A Thousand Different Ways will satisfy those fans — but the truth is, they probably would have stuck with him anyway, even if he did something more interesting than this, which is as predictable and slick as a latter-day Barry Manilow album.

Entertainment Weekly editor Chris Willman wrote that a "great mentor might do something with Aiken's handsome, featureless voice, but A Thousand Different Ways' 11 sound-alike producers uniformly favor an aural morphine drip — suiting a singer who's always emotive but only aspires to actual emotion." Rolling Stone's Andy Greene felt that "making an album this soul-suckingly awful must have taken some hard work. Aiken and his handlers didn't just pick out any old Celine Dion or Bryan Adams song — they went straight to the bottom of the well and chose "Because You Loved Me" and "Everything I Do (I Do It for You)." Toss in some Richard Marx, a flute and a cheesy symphony and you've got the worst episode of American Idol ever."

== Commercial performance ==
A Thousand Different Ways made its debut at number two on the US Billboard 200, selling 211,000 units in its first week, The album spent 14 weeks on the chart and was eventually cerified gold by the Recording Industry Association of America (RIAA) on November 2, 2006. A Thousand Different Ways also opened at six on the Canadian Albums Chart. It was awarded gold status by Music Canada on December 20, 2006.

== Track listing ==
A Thousand Different Ways track listing
No.	Title	Writer(s)	Producer(s)	Length
1.	"Right Here Waiting"	Richard Marx	John Fields	4:20
2.	"Lonely No More"	Andreas Carlsson; Samuel Waermo; Mimmi Waermo; Clay Aiken	Carlsson; S. Waermo	3:27
3.	"Without You"	Pete Ham; Tom Evans	Fields	3:36
4.	"Everytime You Go Away"	Daryl Hall	Adam Anders	4:08
5.	"Sorry Seems to Be the Hardest Word"	Elton John; Bernie Taupin	Per Magnusson; David Kreuger	3:43
6.	"When I See You Smile"	Diane Warren	Fields	4:24
7.	"A Thousand Days"	Christian Leuzzi; Aldo Nova; Emanuel Olsson	Fields	4:28
8.	"(Everything I Do) I Do It for You"	Bryan Adams; Michael Kamen; Mutt Lange	Fields	4:00
9.	"Because You Loved Me"	Diane Warren	Emanuel Kiriakou	4:43
10.	"I Want to Know What Love Is" (featuring Suzie McNeil)	Mick Jones	Russ Irwin; Marti Frederiksen; Charlton Pettus	4:43
11.	"These Open Arms"	Jon Bon Jovi; Desmond Child	Fields	3:27
12.	"Here You Come Again"	Barry Mann; Cynthia Weil	Anders	3:32
13.	"Everything I Have" (featuring William Joseph)	Jeremy Bose	Humberto Gatica	4:07
14.	"Broken Wings"	Richard Page; John Lang; Steve George	Emanuel Kiriakou	3:58
Total length:				55:34

Bonus tracks
No.	Title	Writer(s)	Producer(s)	Length
15.	"Lover All Alone" (iTunes Exclusive; album-only download)	Clay Aiken; David Foster	Kiriakou	4:57
16.	"If You Don't Know Me By Now" (Kmart Exclusive; limited time download)	Kenny Gamble & Leon Huff		3:56

On his 2005 Juke Box Tour, Aiken previewed 3 other songs that did not make the final album cut. "Back For More" was sung at every concert date after its introduction at GMA's Summer Concert Series in 2005. "Tears Run Dry" and "Just You" each got one third of the JBT performance dates.

== Personnel ==
Performers and musicians

- Stephen Lu – String arranger and conductor, piano
- Dorian Crozier – drums
- Tommy Barbarella – Keyboard
- Owsley & Greg Suran – Guitar
- Ken Chastain – Percussion
- Suzie Katsyama – String contractor
- Charlie Bisharat – Violin
- Michele Richards – Violin
- Matt Funes – Viola
- Larry Corbett – Cello
- Jonas Groning – String arranger
- Henrik Nordenback – Drums, Percussion
- Sebastian Nyhlund – Electric guitar, Acoustic Guitar
- Esbjorn Ohrwall – Electric guitar
- Thomas Blindberg – Bass
- Fredrik Larsson – Piano
- Emil Heiling – Background vocals
- Michael Bland – Drums
- Jason Scheff – Background Vocals
- Nikki Hassman – Vocal Production, Background Vocals
- Rasmus "Raz" Billie Bahncke – Keyboard & Drum Programming, String arranger
- Rene Tromborg – Drum Programming
- Cliff Lin – Drum Programming, Guitars, Assistant Engineer, Editing
- Rebecca Walker – Background Vocals
- Jeff Bova – String arranger
- Jules Chaiken – String conductor
- Emanuel Kiriakou – Piano, Acoustic & Electric guitars, Bass, Keyboards, Programming
- Jimi Englund – Drums, Percussion
- Doug Petty – Hammond B-3
- Tom Leonard – Background Vocals
- Russ Irwin – Guitars, Keyboards, Programming
- Charlton Pettus – Guitars, Bass, Programming
- Ryan Brown – Drums
- Quiana Parler – Background Vocals
- Adam Anders – Keyboards, Guitars, Bass
- Shawn Pelton – Drums
- David Foster – String arranger
- Jeremy Lubbock – String arranger
- Dean Parks – Guitar
- Erin Taylor – Additional lyrics, spoken word
- Morgan Grace – Harmony, Background Vocals

Orchestra

- Jay Lifton – String orchestration
- Concertmaster – Marshall Coid, Principal: Dorothy Lawson, Leader: Ralph Farris
- Violins: Jonathan Dinklage, Cornelius Dufallo, Amy Kauffman, Brian Krinke, Carol Pool, Rob Shaw, Yuri Vodovoz, Marshall Coid
- Violas: Juna Chung, David Gold, Lara Lynne Hicks, Ralph Farris
- Cellos: Mairi Dorman-Phaneuf, Erik Friedlander, Dorothy Lawson

== Charts ==
=== Weekly charts ===
Weekly performance for A Thousand Different Ways
Chart (2006)	Peak position
Canadian Albums (Billboard)	6
US Billboard 200	2

=== Year-end charts ===
Year-end performance for A Thousand Different Ways
Chart (2006)	Position
US Billboard 200	156

== Certifications ==
Certifications for A Thousand Different Ways
Region	Certification	Certified units/sales
Canada (Music Canada)	Gold	50,000^{^}
United States (RIAA)	Gold	530,000
^{^} Shipments figures based on certification alone.
