= Clay Aiken =

American singer, actor and producer (born 1978)

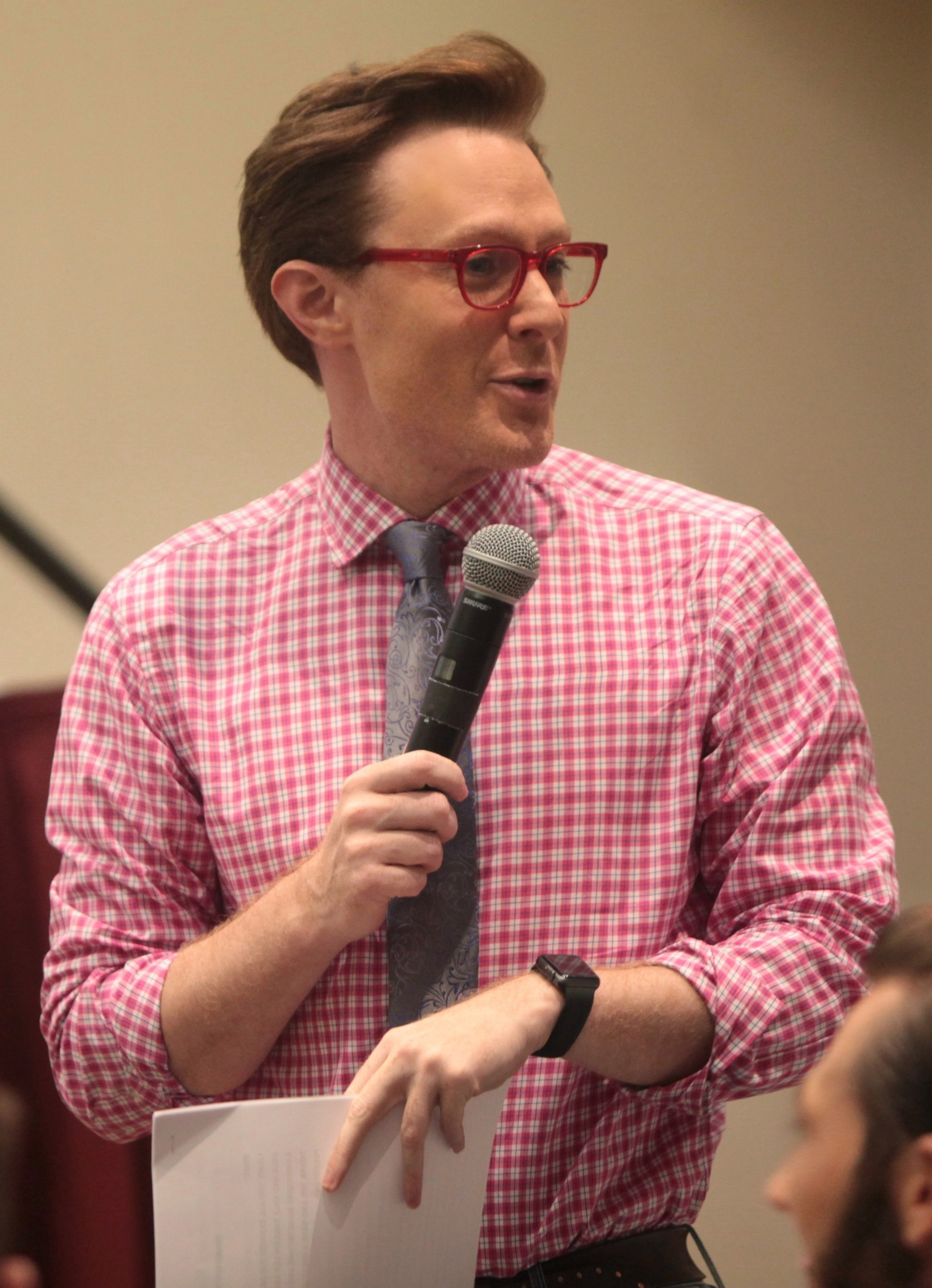
- Aiken at Politicon in 2016
- Born: Clayton Holmes Grissom; November 30, 1978 (age 47); Raleigh, North Carolina, U.S.
- Education: University of North Carolina at Charlotte (BA)
- Occupations: Singer-songwriter; politician; actor; author
- Years active: 2002–present
- Political party: Democratic
- Children: 1
- Musical career
- Genres: Pop; soft rock; R&B
- Instruments: Vocals; guitar
- Labels: RCA; Decca
- Website: clayaiken.com

Signature
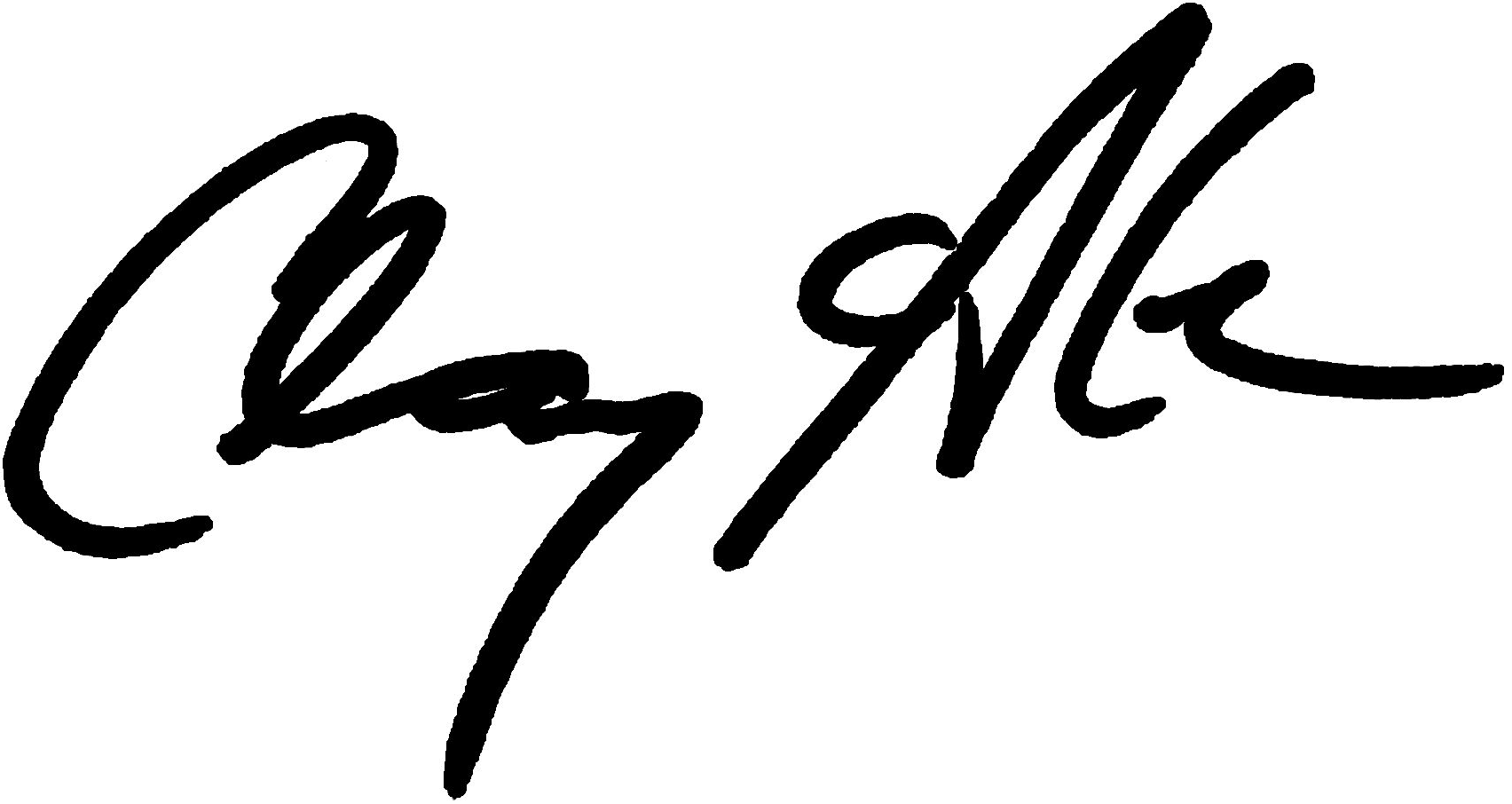

Clayton Holmes Aiken (né Grissom; born November 30, 1978) is an American singer, television personality, actor and political activist. Aiken finished second place on the second season of American Idol in 2003, and his debut album, Measure of a Man, went multi-platinum. He released four more albums on the RCA label, Merry Christmas with Love (2004), A Thousand Different Ways (2006), the Christmas EP All is Well (2006), and On My Way Here (2008). Since then he has released two more albums, both with Decca Records: Tried and True (2010) and Steadfast (2012). Aiken has also had eleven tours in support of his albums.

Aiken co-wrote a bestselling memoir in 2004, Learning to Sing. In 2004, he also had a televised Christmas special, A Clay Aiken Christmas. During much of 2008 he appeared on Broadway in the musical comedy Spamalot, in the role of Sir Robin. In 2010 he hosted the PBS special Tried & True Live! He has also had numerous cameo and guest appearances on TV shows. In 2012 he competed in the fifth season of The Celebrity Apprentice, coming in second to Arsenio Hall.

With Diane Bubel, Aiken created the Bubel/Aiken Foundation in 2003, which was later renamed the National Inclusion Project. In 2004, he became a UNICEF ambassador, a position he held until 2013 when he gave it up to run for Congress. He traveled extensively in this role. In 2006, he was appointed for a two-year term to the Presidential Committee for People with Intellectual Disabilities.

In 2014, Aiken ran for the United States House of Representatives in North Carolina's 2nd congressional district. Initially considered a novelty candidate, Aiken won the Democratic primary, but lost to Republican incumbent Renee Ellmers in the general election. In January 2022, he announced a run for the Democratic nomination in North Carolina's 4th congressional district, but he lost in the primary to Valerie Foushee.

== Early life ==
Clay Aiken was born Clayton Holmes Grissom on November 30, 1978, in Raleigh, North Carolina, where he grew up. As a young boy, Aiken sang in the Raleigh Boychoir; and, as a teenager, he sang in school choirs, church choir, musicals and local theatre productions. After high school, he sang lead with a local band, Just By Chance, co-hosting and performing with the band at "Just by Chance and Friends" shows in Dunn, North Carolina. He was also MC and performer at the Johnston Community College Country Showcase in Smithfield and at the North Carolina Music Connection and Hometown Music Connection shows in Garner, and Benson. He performed the national anthem numerous times for the Raleigh IceCaps and the Carolina Hurricanes hockey teams, and performed it at the 2011 NHL All-Star Game at the RBC Center in Raleigh. Three demo albums of Aiken's vocals were created before American Idol with the aid of studio time given as a birthday gift by his mother: a cassette called Look What Love Has Done (by Clayton Grissom), a cassette and CD entitled Redefined (by Clayton Aiken), and a CD that combined some songs from each of the previous demos: "Look What Love Has Done, Vol 2" (by Clay Aiken). Estranged from his abusive birth father Vernon Grissom and with his mother's and grandfather Alvis Aiken's permission, at the age of 19 he legally changed his surname from Grissom to his mother Faye's maiden name, Aiken.

Aiken attended Raleigh's Leesville Road High School and took courses at Campbell University before enrolling at the University of North Carolina at Charlotte. In 1995, Aiken started working at the YMCA. Still in high school, Aiken learned quickly that he could make a difference in the lives of young people. He found his interest in special education while directing YMCA children's camps as a teenager, and at age 19, he served as a substitute teacher for a classroom of autistic students at Brentwood Elementary School in Raleigh. It was during that experience that he decided to finish college and become a special education teacher. While attending college in Charlotte, he took a part-time job as an assistant to an autistic boy, and it was this child's mother, Diane Bubel, who urged him to audition for American Idol. Although his American Idol activities temporarily delayed his academic pursuits, Aiken completed his course work while on tour and graduated with a bachelor's degree in special education in December 2003.

== American Idol ==
Aiken had filled out an application to participate in the reality show The Amazing Race when a friend of his insisted that he try out for American Idol instead. Television viewers first glimpsed Aiken during the audition episodes at the beginning of American Idol's second season. The show's judges first saw Aiken as a nerdy type unlikely to be a typical pop idol, but after hearing him sing Heatwave's "Always and Forever" decided to advance him to the next round. The clip of the judges' surprise during this audition performance was replayed many times over the course of the competition.

Aiken made it to the round of 32 before being cut from the show, but he was invited to return for the "Wild Card" round; his performance of Elton John's "Don't Let the Sun Go Down on Me" sent him on to the final 12 as the viewer's choice. While noted for his performance of ballads, such as Neil Sedaka's "Solitaire", his upbeat performances, including the Foundations' "Build Me Up Buttercup", were also appreciated. Aiken received enough votes every week to keep him out of the bottom three. Part of his appeal was his "geek to chic" transformation in appearance. "I looked like Opie", Aiken said to People magazine regarding his appearance at his American Idol audition in 2002. He replaced his glasses with contact lenses and agreed to let the show's stylists change his hair style. With longer, flat ironed, spiky hair and a penchant for wearing striped shirts, Aiken had established a trademark look by the final American Idol season 2 show.

On May 21, 2003, Aiken came in a close second to Ruben Studdard, who won the contest by 134,000 votes out of more than 24,000,000 votes cast. The result was controversial, as some hypothesized that Idol's voting system was incapable of handling the number of attempted calls. In an interview prior to the start of the fifth season of American Idol, Executive Producer Nigel Lythgoe revealed for the first time that Aiken had led the fan voting every week from the Wild Card week to the finale, when the possibly-random voting result gave Studdard the win.

Rolling Stone featured Aiken on the cover of its July 2003 issue. In the cover article, Aiken said, "One thing I've found of people in the public eye, either you're a womanizer or you've got to be gay. Since I'm neither one of those, people are completely concerned about me." In subsequent interviews he expressed frustration over continued questions about his sexual orientation, telling People magazine in 2006, "It doesn't matter what I say. People are going to believe what they want."

Aiken made a surprise appearance on the final show of the fifth season of American Idol, when failed auditioner Michael Sandecki returned to the show to receive a "Golden Idol" award for Best Impersonator for his Clay Aiken-like appearance. Aiken appeared without introduction in a well-tailored designer suit and longer, darker hair with bangs, looking so different that many did not recognize him until he began to sing "Don't Let the Sun Go Down on Me". The second season of the American Idol Rewind series (2007) was narrated by Aiken.

Aiken is reportedly one of the top 10 earners of Idol, earning an estimated $1.5 million in 2010.

=== American Idol season 2 performances and results ===
Week	Theme	Song	Artist	Order	Result
Audition	Free Choice	"Always And Forever"	Heatwave	N/A	Advanced
Top 32/ Semi-final Group 2	Free Choice	"Open Arms"	Journey	1	Top 3 Wild Card
Wild Card	Free Choice	"Don't Let The Sun Go Down on Me"	Elton John	2	Selected; Public Vote
Top 12	Motown	"I Can't Help Myself (Sugar Pie Honey Bunch)"	Four Tops	7	Safe
Top 11	Movie Soundtracks	"Somewhere Out There" – An American Tail	Linda Ronstadt/ James Ingram	4	Safe
Top 10	Country Rock	"Someone Else's Star"	Bryan White	10	Safe
Top 8^{1}	Disco	"Everlasting Love"	Carl Carlton	4	Safe
Top 8	Billboard Number 1	"At This Moment"	Billy Vera	1	Safe
Top 7	Billy Joel	"Tell Her About It"	Billy Joel	7	Safe
Top 6	Diane Warren	"I Could Not Ask For More"	Edwin McCain	2	Safe
Top 5	1960s Neil Sedaka	"Build Me Up Buttercup" "Solitaire"	The Foundations; Neil Sedaka	5; 10	Safe
Top 4	Bee Gees	"To Love Somebody" "Grease"	Bee Gees; Frankie Valli	2; 6	Safe
Top 3	Random Choice; Judges' Choice; Idol's Choice	"Vincent" "Mack The Knife" "Unchained Melody"	Don McLean; Bobby Darin; The Righteous Brothers	3; 6; 9	Safe
Top 2	Finale	"This Is the Night" "Here, There And Everywhere" "Bridge Over Troubled Water"	Clay Aiken; The Beatles; Simon & Garfunkel	2; 4; 6	Runner-up

- ^Note 1 Due to Corey Clark's disqualification, the Top 9 performances became Top 8 when no one was eliminated.

== Music ==
=== 2003–2004: Measure of a Man ===
On October 14, 2003, Aiken released his first solo album, Measure of a Man, which debuted at number one on the Billboard 200, with 613,000 copies sold in its first week, the highest-selling debut for a solo artist in 10 years. The album received RIAA Double Platinum certification on November 17, 2003 (a Double Platinum plaque was presented to Aiken by Clive Davis on October 22, 2003, during Good Morning America). The album spawned both the hit single "Invisible" and his first hit song, "This Is the Night" (both co-written by British songwriter Chris Braide). Later that year, Aiken won the Fan's Choice Award at the American Music Awards ceremony, and his CD single "This Is The Night/Bridge Over Troubled Water" won the Billboard award for the Best-Selling Single of 2003.

=== 2004–2006: Merry Christmas With Love ===
On November 16, 2004, Aiken released a holiday album titled Merry Christmas with Love, which set a new record for fastest-selling holiday album in the Soundscan era (since 1991). The album debuted at number four on the Billboard 200 and tied Céline Dion's record for the highest debut by a holiday album in the history of Billboard magazine. Merry Christmas with Love sold over 1,000,000 copies retail in six weeks and was the best-selling holiday album of 2004, receiving RIAA Platinum certification on January 6, 2005.

=== 2006–2008: A Thousand Different Ways And All Is Well ===
Aiken's second studio album, A Thousand Different Ways, was released September 19, 2006. He worked on the album under the guidance of Canadian producer and A&R executive Jaymes Foster. The album contains ten cover songs and four new songs, one of which Aiken co-wrote. Clive Davis is credited with the cover concept. with the album on iTunes. Debuting at number two on the Billboard chart, A Thousand Different Ways made Aiken the fourth artist ever to have his first three albums debut in the Top 5 and scan over 200,000 in the first week.

Aiken's second Christmas album, All Is Well (an EP of four Christmas songs), was released exclusively to Walmart on November 28, 2006, and was released to iTunes as a digital download in December 2007.

=== 2008–2009: On My Way Here ===
Aiken stated in an April 2007 interview with People that he was planning a new album, and during his May 2007 appearance on Jimmy Kimmel Live!, he mentioned that he was in Los Angeles interviewing producers for the new album. Aiken found a song, "On My Way Here", written by OneRepublic frontman Ryan Tedder, that struck a chord with him and became the inspiration for the album's theme in addition to the album title. For a cohesive sound, Aiken chose Mark 'Kipper' Eldridge to produce the entire album. On My Way Here was released May 6, 2008, on the RCA label.

According to an article posted on Billboard, Aiken and RCA parted ways shortly after his On My Way Here album was released. Aiken's rep confirmed to People magazine that Aiken left RCA. Stated in the cited People article, "The buzz about Aiken's exit was fueled earlier this week when his picture disappeared online and Billboard, citing unnamed sources, reported Friday that Aiken, 30, had been dropped by the label. According to Billboard, Aiken's 2008 album "On My Way Here" sold just 159,000 copies in the U.S., compared to his 2003 debut album, "Measure of a Man", which sold 2.78 million copies".

A fifth album, The Very Best of Clay Aiken, was released at the end of March 2009 on Sony's Legacy Recordings Playlist Series. This album was a compilation of songs that had been included on the previous albums released by RCA. First week sales of 3000 copies placed Playlist: The Very Best of Clay Aiken at number 173 on the Billboard 200 chart and at number ten on the Top Internet Albums chart.

=== 2009–2011: Tried and True ===
On August 10, 2009, it was announced on Aiken's official website that he had signed with Decca Records and he would have new music out by early 2010. Performing the songs from his new album, Tried and True, Aiken held a one night only concert at the Raleigh Memorial Auditorium in Raleigh, North Carolina on March 12, 2010. The concert, filmed for PBS broadcast, included guest appearances by Ruben Studdard and Linda Eder. Eder joined Aiken on stage for their duet of "Crying", which they recorded for his album. The album was released on June 1, 2010, and features songs popular in the 1950s and 1960s, including two Aiken covered during his run on American Idol, "Mack the Knife" and "Unchained Melody". In conjunction with the PBS special a companion DVD, Tried & True Live!, was released on July 27, 2010. A tour to promote the album is planned for early 2014.

=== 2011–present: Steadfast and Christmas Bells Are Ringing ===
On December 20, 2011, Aiken released a new single, "Bring Back My Love" under the Decca Label. The single is his first original song since the release of his album On My Way Here in 2008. On March 27, 2012, Aiken released Steadfast, a new album of previous recordings and songs only sung in concerts. The album debuted at number 120 on the Billboard 200 chart with sales of 4,000 in the first week.

On November 22, 2024, Aiken released a new holiday album, Christmas Bells Are Ringing. Aiken has released three new singles, a Father's Day version of his song "Measure of a Man" and two new versions of "Invisible".

On May 11, 2026, Aiken released a new single “Rewind”. The full album will be released September 25, 2026.

== Television ==
Aiken has made many television appearances.

On Labor Day 2003, Aiken sang "Bridge Over Troubled Water" at the Jerry Lewis MDA Telethon and received a standing ovation from the audience. Lewis compared Aiken with Frank Sinatra and marveled at the dedication of Aiken's fan base:

We have someone here today from the smash hit show American Idol. We're thrilled to have him joining us today, because when it was made known that he would appear on this Telethon, the emails and the fan clubs that this young man has have sent us $30,000.00 just at the fact that he was here. And I can honestly say I have never, in all of my life, seen a theatrical groundswell that this kid has motivated, that it makes us all come right back to the bobby sox and Frank. And isn't it nice to live through that magnificence again? Here is Clay Aiken.

That same year, Aiken sang "The Star-Spangled Banner" on the opening night of the 2003 World Series and appeared in numerous television specials during the winter of 2003, including Disney's Christmas Day Parade and the Nick at Nite Holiday Special, where he sang the "Little Drummer Boy/Peace on Earth" with Bing Crosby via special effects.

Aiken starred in and executive produced his first TV special (December 2004), titled A Clay Aiken Christmas, with special guests Barry Manilow, Yolanda Adams, and Megan Mullally; the special was released on DVD later that month. On July 4, 2004, Aiken was one of the performers in the A Capitol Fourth concert in Washington, D.C. and performed in the Good Morning America Summer Concert Series in 2004 and 2005. He also sang "Isn't She Lovely" on the popular television show Scrubs.

Aiken was the musical guest on Saturday Night Live in 2004 and participated in several skits. He has appeared multiple times on The Tonight Show, interviewing with Jay Leno as a guest in addition to singing, and has become a regular guest on Jimmy Kimmel Live!. The Kimmel appearances often feature skits: in one, Jimmy Kimmel's then girlfriend Sarah Silverman confessed to an affair with Aiken, and in another, Aiken expressed his distaste for Kimmel's jokes about him by beating him up. In May 2007, he spent the first half of his interview on horseback while talking about his recent UNICEF trip to Afghanistan. A few weeks later he appeared as a spokesperson for "Guillermo's Mustache" in Kimmel's fictional DVD informercial shown on the Dancing with the Stars finale. Aiken made his acting debut on Ed in early 2004, playing himself, and in 2005, he was interviewed by Erica Kane on All My Children. He played the role of cafeteria worker Kenny on the Scrubs episode "My Life in Four Cameras". In December 2006, he made an appearance as himself on Days of Our Lives.

After hosting and performing in the American Idol Christmas special in 2003, Aiken has had several subsequent hosting jobs. He was a special correspondent for The Insider for the 2005 Emmy Awards, and on the sets of the sitcom Reba with Reba McEntire and Dancing with the Stars. He co-hosted The Morning Show with Mike and Juliet in 2006, and on November 17, 2006, filled in for Regis Philbin as guest host on Live with Regis and Kelly. During an interview, Aiken covered Kelly Ripa's mouth with his hand. The incident drew considerable media reaction after Ripa complained at length about the incident on her show the following Monday. Aiken made fun of the controversy on the 2006 American Music Awards the next night with Tori Spelling. On The Tyra Banks Show in 2006, filmed before the Ripa incident, Aiken mentioned wanting to have his own talk show someday, and Banks switched seats with him and let him interview her for one segment of the show. Aiken was a guest judge on the April 8, 2009, segment of Banks show America's Next Top Model; in what the show refers to as a teach, he worked with the remaining eight contestants on their acting skills prior to the judging.

In November 2007, Aiken was a contestant on a celebrity edition of the game show Are You Smarter than a 5th Grader?. Playing for his charity, the National Inclusion Project, he chose to drop out after the ninth question with US$300,000, despite having a copy and a save at his disposal. If he had played the tenth question, he would have won US$500,000; Aiken and the 5th grader playing with him both had the correct answer.

In May 2009, Aiken made a guest appearance on 30 Rock in the season 3 episode "Kidney Now!". It was revealed in this episode that he is the cousin of the show's character Kenneth.

In August 2010, Aiken guest starred in an episode of Phineas and Ferb, called "Phineas and Ferb: Summer Belongs to You!". Aiken sang an inspirational duet with Chaka Khan, to encourage those who did not believe that Phineas and Ferb could accomplish their goal of circling the globe faster than the sun, thus creating the longest summer day of all time.

On January 30, 2011, Aiken sang the United States' national anthem at the 2011 NHL All-Star game held at the RBC Center in Raleigh, North Carolina, home of the Carolina Hurricanes.

On July 24, 2011, Aiken guest starred on the comedy drama series Drop Dead Diva.

In 2012, Aiken was the runner-up on the fifth season of The Celebrity Apprentice, raising US$361,500 for the National Inclusion Project.

Aiken appeared in one of the last episodes of The Office, titled "A.A.R.M.". He played himself and was one of the judges for a reality show that Andy was auditioning for.

In 2013, Aiken guest starred on an episode Law & Order: Special Victims Unit along with Taylor Hicks and Ashanti, playing themselves as judges for a singing contest on the episode called "Dissonant Voices".

In 2024, Aiken paired up with Ruben Studdard when they competed in eleventh season of The Masked Singer as "Beets". They were eliminated during the Group B final.

== Broadway ==
On January 18, 2008, Aiken made his Broadway debut when he joined the cast of Monty Python's Spamalot for a four-month run, ending on May 4, 2008. He played Sir Robin, in the Tony Award-winning musical directed by Mike Nichols. In addition to Sir Robin, Aiken played the 1st Guard and the Brother Maynard roles. On August 12, 2008, it was announced that Aiken would resume his role as Sir Robin beginning on September 19 and ending on January 4, 2009. On December 23, 2008, Aiken had his caricature unveiled at world-famous Sardi's restaurant. In December 2018, Aiken and Ruben Studdard starred in Ruben & Clay's First Annual Family Fun Pageant Spectacular Reunion Christmas Show on Broadway.

== Other theater work ==
In May 2013, Aiken starred as "Man in Chair" in North Carolina Theatre's production of The Drowsy Chaperone, along with fellow Raleigh native and Tony Award winner Beth Leavel, who reprised her role as "The Chaperone".

During the summer of 2013, Aiken performed the role of Joseph in the musical Joseph and the Amazing Technicolor Dreamcoat at the Ogunquit Playhouse in Ogunquit, Maine. Aiken enjoyed the role because he did not have to dance.

In June 2019, Aiken starred as Teen Angel in Grease at the Benedum Center in Pittsburgh. "The energy level is high, but there's no question it steps up a notch when Clay Aiken struts out in the second act and gives Pittsburgh a taste of why his Claymates are hopelessly devoted to the former American Idol." "As 'Teen Angel' in the Pittsburgh CLO's production of Grease, Aiken is only on stage for about five minutes. Those five minutes, however, are fab-u-lous."

== Tours ==
From February through April 2004, Aiken and Kelly Clarkson embarked on the Independent Tour as co-headliners. Following this tour, he was scheduled for a few summer solo tour dates, but demand ultimately led to the booking of 50 dates across the United States, resulting in what many fans called the "Not-A-Tour". Disney (Buena Vista) was the exclusive sponsor of this unnamed summer tour, promoting their Aladdin Special Edition 2-Disc DVD with a preview of Aiken's rendition of "Proud of Your Boy", a song originally intended for the first release of the film but cut when the Aladdin storyline changed during production. A music video featuring Aiken is on the Aladdin Special Edition DVD. On this tour, he also performed a duet, "Without You", which was released on Kimberley Locke's 2004 debut album One Love.

In November 2004, Aiken launched his third tour of the year, which revolved around a Christmas theme. "The Joyful Noise Tour", sponsored by Ronald McDonald House Charities, featured a conductor and a 30-piece orchestra. In some cities, Aiken was supported by the local philharmonic or symphony, such as the Baltimore Symphony Orchestra and the Atlanta Symphony Orchestra. Local choirs from high schools and elementary schools also participated at each concert.

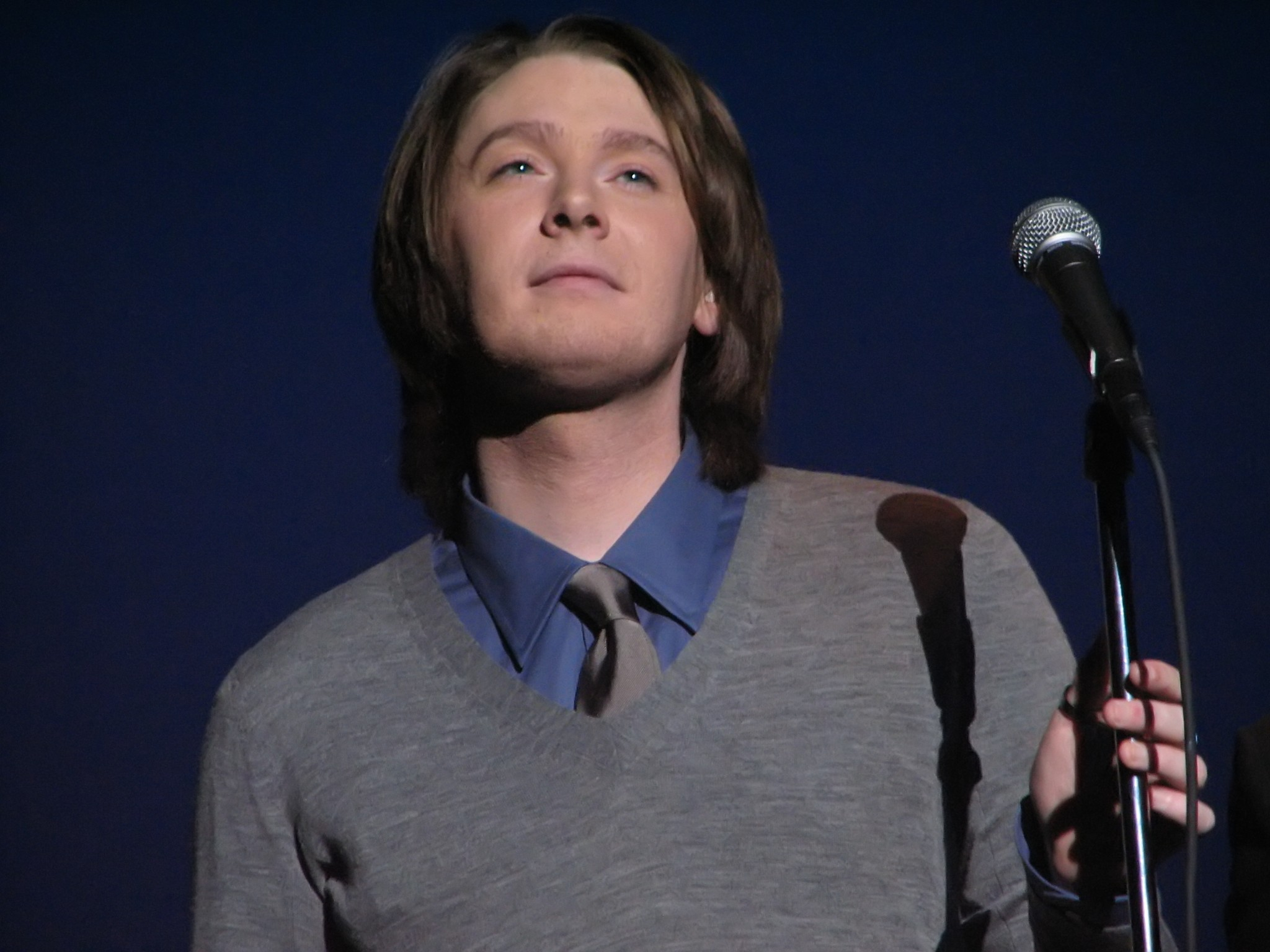
Aiken at a 2006 Christmas tour appearance in Waukegan, Illinois

During the summer of 2005, Aiken, with a seven-piece band and three back-up singers, toured with the "Jukebox Tour", performing songs of the 1950s, 1960s, 1970s, 1980s, and 1990s, as well as a few favorites from Measure of a Man. He also performed a few new songs being considered for his next album.

In early November 2005, Aiken launched his second Christmas tour. The 2005 Joyful Noise tour featured a series of vignettes, written by Aiken, which told the story of an older woman who had lost the Christmas spirit and a young boy who helps her find it again. A cast of actors, dancers and back-up singers traveled with the tour, and members of local theater groups were added in each venue for smaller, non-speaking roles and crowd scenes. The tour opened in Vancouver, British Columbia, on November 2, and ended in Clearwater, Florida on December 30. According to Pollstar, Aiken's first five tours grossed $28 million.

In December 2006, Aiken began his third Christmas tour, comprising performances in 18 Midwest and East Coast cities. Aiken was supported by local orchestras, which also opened the concerts with a program of seasonal music.

A 23-date tour in support of his third album, A Thousand Different Ways, began on July 4, 2007, and ended in Orlando, Florida, on August 19. On this tour Aiken hired local symphonies to back him, along with tour regulars Jesse Vargas, pianist, conductor and arranger; Sean McDaniel, drummer; and Quiana Parler and Angela Fisher, backup singers. Stops included the Greek Theatre (Los Angeles), Chautauqua Institution in New York, and the Mann Center for the Performing Arts in Philadelphia. Three days into the tour, Aiken and a woman were involved in an in-flight altercation in which she allegedly shoved him. As a result of the scuffle, Aiken and the woman were later questioned by the FBI. Aiken told Entertainment Tonight that he had been sleeping when the incident occurred.

His fourth annual Christmas tour, "Christmas in the Heartland", began on November 26, 2007, in Wichita, Kansas. That 21-date tour ended on December 22, 2007, in Merrillville, Indiana.

He has ended all of his Christmas tours with his signature Christmas song, "Don't Save It All For Christmas Day".

Aiken and Ruben Studdard brought their "Timeless" tour to cities in the US and Canada beginning in Asheville, North Carolina, on July 23, 2010, and ending in Biloxi, Mississippi, on August 14. Instead of a concert focusing on each singers recordings, Aiken and Studdard opted for a variety show format covering medleys of songs from the 1960s to the 1990s with a few solos and interspersed with comedy bits.

Aiken announced on July 30, 2010, that he will be touring in February and March 2011 in conjunction with PBS to support his album Tried and True and accompanying live DVD Clay Aiken: Tried and True – Live.

Aiken began his fifth Christmas tour "Joyful Noise 2012" in Florida in November 2012.

== Activism ==
In 1995, Aiken started working at the YMCA.

At 19, Aiken taught at Brentwood Elementary School in a class of autistic children. It was during that experience that he decided to finish college and become a special education teacher.

Aiken has participated in multiple benefit events and concerts, including the 2004 Rosalynn Carter Benefit, the America's Promise Benefit, and Heather Headley's Broadway Cares/Equity Fights AIDS benefit, "Home", where he sang a duet with Headley. He was one of the celebrity readers for the Arthur Celebrity Audiobook (Stories for Heroes Series), which benefits the Bubel/Aiken Foundation (now the National Inclusion Project) and other charities, and served as spokesperson for the series. He was also a spokesperson for the 2004 Toys For Tots drive, and acted as an ambassador for the Ronald McDonald House Charities. Aiken worked with the Make A Wish Foundation to make one little boy's dream of singing on stage with Clay Aiken come true.

In September 2006, Aiken was appointed to the Presidential Committee for People with Intellectual Disabilities by President George W. Bush. Appointees serve a two-year term; Aiken was sworn on September 14, 2006, by HHS Assistant Secretary for Children and Families Wade F. Horn, PhD

While appearing in Spamalot, Aiken used his free time and celebrity to help raise funds for Broadway Cares/Equity Fights AIDS (BC/EFA) during their fund drives and auctions. In 2010, Aiken spoke out for gay rights at the Human Rights Campaign dinner in North Carolina. He also joined other celebrities in filming an educational video for Cyndi Lauper's web based Give a Damn campaign, a project of her True Colors Fund. In addition to UNICEF and his National Inclusion Project he is promoting GLSEN, the Gay, Lesbian and Straight Education Network as one of his causes on his official website.

=== National Inclusion Project (formerly BAF) ===
Aiken's interest in autism-related issues led him, along with Diane Bubel (whose son Michael is autistic and was tutored by Aiken), to found the National Inclusion Project (formerly the Bubel/Aiken Foundation), which supports the integration of disabled children into the life environment of their non-disabled peers. The foundation runs summer camps which reflect its mission, and also presents Able to Serve awards to support the volunteer efforts of mentally and physically disabled children. In July 2005, Raleigh's WRAL-TV reported on an internet campaign mounted by critics questioning how Aiken's foundation used its money. WRAL news hired an independent accountant who reported that program services totaled $920,000 in 2004—around 85 cents on every dollar donated—which is considered a solid percentage compared to other charities. CNN picked up the story, and Aiken appeared on Showbiz Tonight to provide details about the foundation's programs. In late 2004, the foundation was awarded a $500,000 grant by the US government to develop a K–12 model for inclusion in community service projects to be used in schools across the country. In addition, State Farm granted $1.5 million to the foundation to help develop a primary education curriculum focused on teaching social and life skills through service to children of all levels of ability.

On August 5, 2009, in an open letter from the founders, Clay Aiken and Diane Bubel announced that they would rename the organization as the "National Inclusion Project".

=== UNICEF ===
In November 2004, Aiken was appointed a U.S. Fund for UNICEF National Ambassador, with a mission to help ensure that children everywhere are afforded a primary education. After the tsunami at the end of 2004, he participated in the NBC4 telethon, which raised over $10 million, and recorded public service announcements in support of South Asian tsunami relief. He later recorded a video, featuring the song "Give A Little Bit", to be used as a public service announcement to raise money for tsunami victims. He was the 2005 spokesperson for the Trick-or-Treat for UNICEF drive.

In March 2005, UNICEF sent Aiken to the tsunami-stricken Banda Aceh area to raise awareness of the need to restore education quickly to the children who survived this disaster. UNICEF sent Aiken on another mission in May 2005, to northern Uganda, to witness the plight of children called "night commuters", who flee the villages each night to sleep in streets and shelters in hopes of avoiding being kidnapped by the Lord's Resistance Army. He was sent to Kabul and Bamyan, in Afghanistan in April 2007, where he was able to spend time with children in their classrooms; he also visited a health center for women and children where he administered oral polio vaccinations to babies. He observed that Afghani children, after being forbidden for so many years by the Taliban regime to attend school, are eager to return to school now that they are once again allowed to receive an education. Aiken spent his 2007 Christmas in Mexico with the children affected by the floods in the states of Chiapas and Tabasco. In late June and early July 2008, UNICEF sent Aiken to Somalia and Kenya.

== Politics ==
=== 2014 Congressional election ===
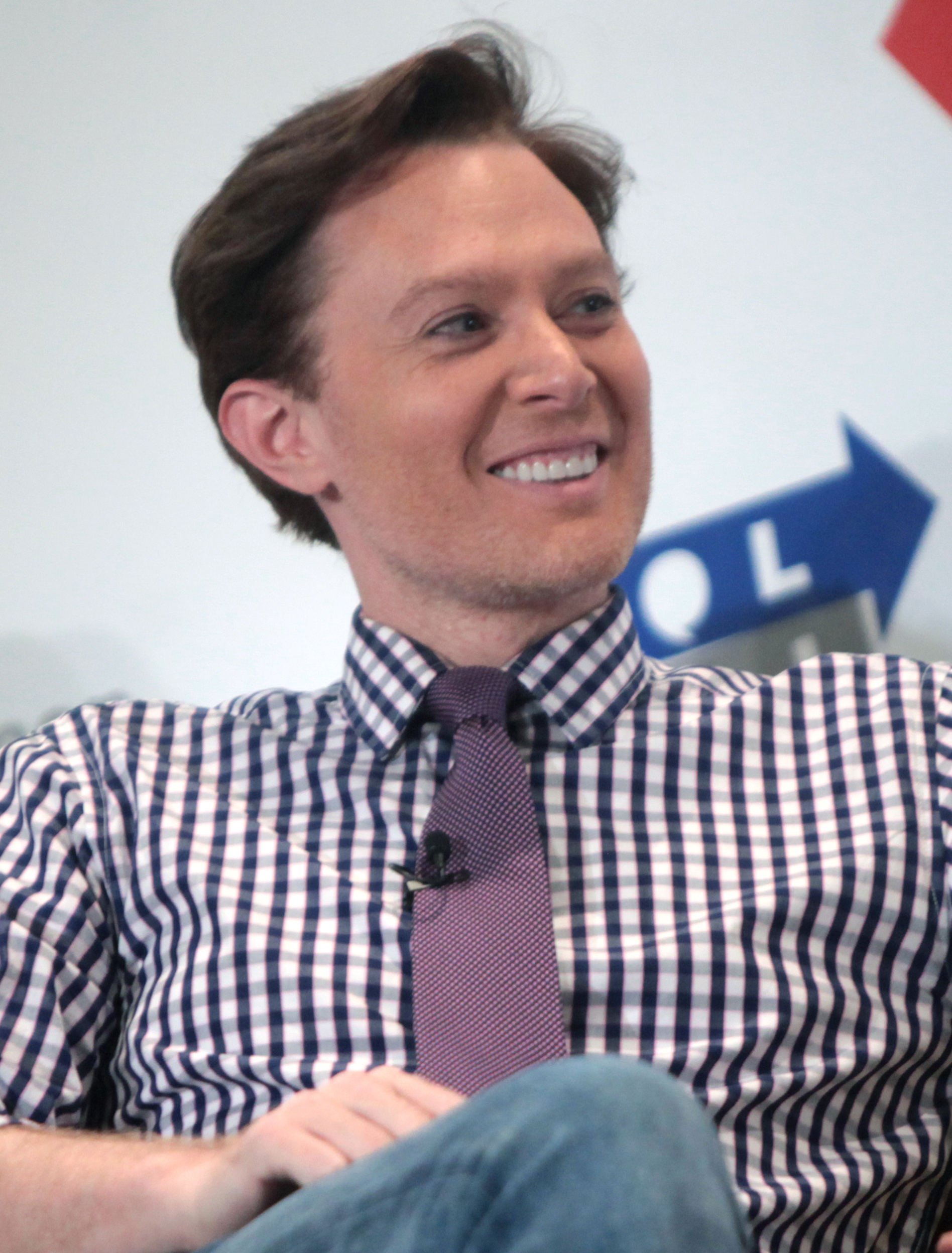
Aiken speaking at Politicon in June 2016

In the 2014 midterm elections, Aiken was the Democratic Party's nominee for North Carolina's 2nd congressional district. He won the Democratic primary, held on May 6, 2014, by fewer than 400 votes. His main opponent, Keith Crisco, died days after the primary vote but before the votes could be certified. In the general election, held on November 4, 2014, Aiken was defeated by incumbent Republican Congresswoman Renee Ellmers, 59 to 41 percent. North Carolina's 2nd district is considered a safe Republican seat. Aiken's campaign was captured by a filmmaking team and shown in the 2015 documentary miniseries The Runner-up, which aired on the Esquire Network.

Since coming out as gay in 2008, Aiken has been more politically outspoken, particularly on gay rights and same-sex marriage. He spoke out against North Carolina Amendment 1, adopted in 2012, which banned gay marriage and civil unions in the state. When he ran for Congress, however, he said he did not want to be perceived as a single-issue candidate and said gay marriage was "not the issue" he was campaigning on. He said he wanted to focus on issues that were more important to people in his district. His assertion earned him a number of critics among supporters of same-sex marriage, including Bill Maher.

Citing his appearance on The Apprentice, Aiken defended Donald Trump against accusations of racism during the 2016 presidential race. However, following the August 2017 Unite the Right rally in Charlottesville, Virginia, Aiken tweeted an apology for denying Trump was racist, going so far to say, "I'm a fucking dumbass." Aiken reiterated that he was a Democrat and did not vote for Trump.

=== 2022 Congressional election ===
In January 2022, Aiken released a video titled "Warming Up", in which he announced that he would run for the Democratic nomination in North Carolina's 4th congressional district. In this video, Aiken is quoted as saying, "If the loudest and most hateful voices think they are going to speak for us, just tell them I'm warming up the old vocal chords."

Sara Pequeño, a member of the Raleigh-based The News & Observer editorial board, criticized Aiken for jumping into the race when other Democratic candidates had more political experience and questioned "what has he done to serve North Carolina?"

In the Democratic primary, Aiken was overshadowed by two other Democratic candidates, state Senator Valerie Foushee and Durham County Commissioner Nida Allam and he finished third place in the eight candidate primary.

=== Electoral history ===
==== 2014 ====
Democratic primary election results
Party	Candidate	Votes	%
Democratic	Clay Aiken	11,634	40.83
Democratic	Keith Crisco	11,265	39.54
Democratic	Toni Morris	5,593	19.63
Turnout		28,492	

North Carolina's 2nd Congressional District, 2014
Party	Candidate	Votes	%
Republican	Renee Ellmers (Incumbent)	122,128	58.83
Democratic	Clay Aiken	85,479	41.17
Total votes		207,607	100

==== 2022 ====
2022 North Carolina's 4th congressional district Democratic primary
Party	Candidate	Votes	%
Democratic	Valerie Foushee	40,531	46.15
Democratic	Nida Allam	32,424	36.92
Democratic	Clay Aiken	6,469	7.37
Democratic	Ashley Ward	4,730	5.39
Democratic	Richard Watkins III	1,132	1.29
Democratic	Crystal Cavalier	1,104	1.26
Democratic	Stephen Valentine	1,004	1.14
Democratic	Matt Grooms	433	0.49
Total votes		87,827	100.0

== Fans ==
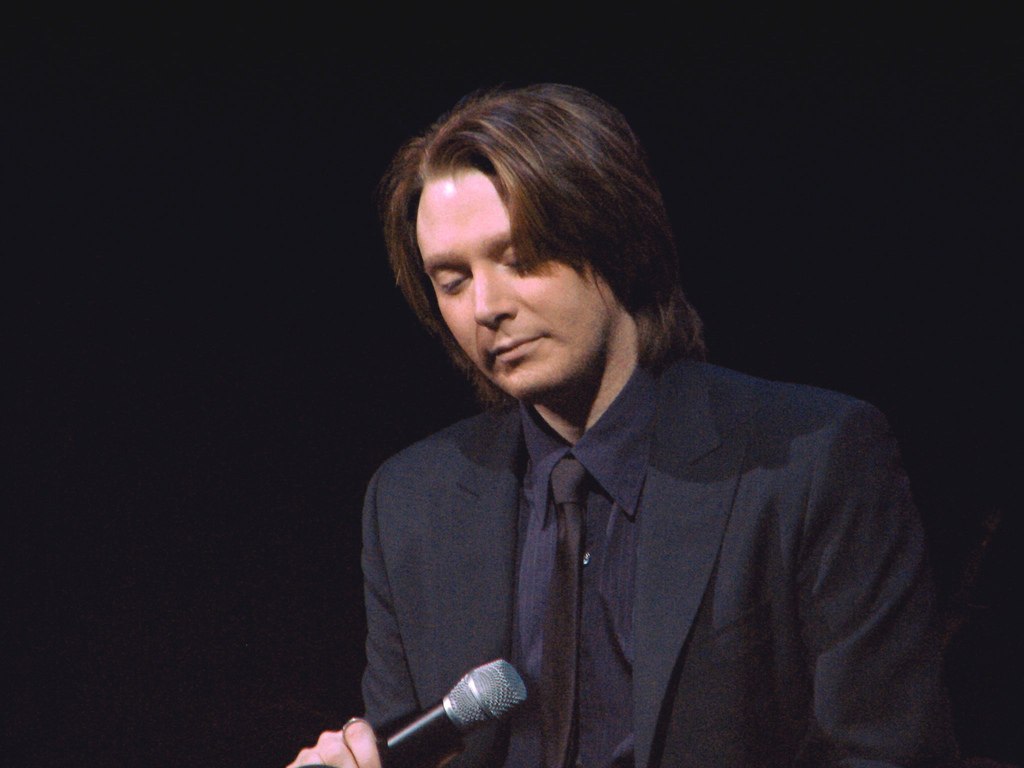
Aiken at a 2006 Christmas tour appearance in Merrillville, Indiana

Aiken was voted the Favorite Reality Star of 2003 by TV Guide readers and "the most-loved reality star of all time" in a TV Guide poll conducted in the summer of 2005. In February 2006, People magazine readers voted Aiken their "Favorite American Idol".

While the origin of the term "Claymates" is unknown, Aiken trademarked the term. While in Los Angeles in September 2006 for a CD signing and appearance on Jimmy Kimmel Live!, Aiken talked with Jann Carl of Entertainment Tonight about the names various sub-groups have given themselves: "Claysians" (Asian fans), "Claynadians" (Canadian fans), "Clayropeans" (European fans) and "Claydawgs" (male fans). She then teased him about having his own "Clay Nation". At the CD signing, two young fans asked Aiken to autograph their shoulderblades and then went to the local tattoo parlor to make them permanent; later that day on Jimmy Kimmel Live! they were brought on stage to show the tattoos. Although some of his fans have been criticized at times by the media as being obsessive, he defends the group as a whole. When Kimmel said to Aiken that his fans were "crazy", Aiken stated that they were merely "enthusiastic". In 2003, in anticipation of the release of Measure of a Man, fans all over the country decided to get together and hold parties to celebrate the release of the CD and purchase copies at midnight. In 2006, for the release of A Thousand Different Ways, release parties were held in more than 80 cities in the United States, Canada, and Singapore.

== Personal life ==
On August 8, 2008, Aiken announced, on his personal blog, the birth of his son in North Carolina: "My dear friend, Jaymes, and I are so excited to announce the birth of Parker Foster Aiken." The child's mother, Jaymes Foster, is the sister of record producer David Foster, executive producer of Aiken's last three albums on the RCA label. "The little man is healthy, happy, and as loud as his daddy", Aiken wrote. "Mama Jaymes is doing quite well also." In his book, Learning to Sing: Hearing the Music in Your Life, Aiken said, "It's a Southern tradition to be given your first name from your grandmama's maiden name." Aiken's middle name came from his paternal grandmother's maiden name; he and Foster used the married surnames of their mothers to name their son.

After several years of public speculation, Aiken came out as gay in a September 2008 interview with People magazine. He later said that his coming out caused him to lose "fifty percent of [his] fanbase" at the time. In April 2009, Aiken was honored by the Family Equality Council advocacy group at its annual benefit dinner in New York City.

On November 18, 2010, Aiken went to Washington, D.C., on behalf of Gay, Lesbian and Straight Education Network (GLSEN) at a Capitol Hill briefing talking about anti-gay bullying.

=== Faith and philosophy ===
Aiken was born into a Baptist family. As a toddler, in 1980, he attended Leesville Baptist Church every week. According to his book, Learning to Sing: Hearing the Music in Your Life, he was involved in Bible school, choir, and the youth group. The book made The New York Times Best Seller list in 2004, debuting at number two. It was written with Allison Glock and published by Random House. Barely mentioning American Idol, Aiken instead turned his focus to the people who had the most influence in his life—his mother, grandparents, siblings, teachers, and friends—and to the importance of religion in his life. He describes himself as a proud Southern Baptist who journeyed away from those roots in his late teens in search of a religion with more liberal social policies. He then returned to that church because of family and social ties, although he remains at odds with the church on some issues.

When asked in a PBS Kids interview to name his idols, he responded, "When people ask me what three people I'd like to have dinner with, living or dead, I say Jesus Christ, Mr. Rogers, and Jimmy Carter."

While not self-identified as a Christian music artist, Aiken was featured in Christian Music Planet as an "American Idol Christian" in 2004, and in a cover story, "Clay Aiken's Balancing Act", in the January/February 2005 issue. His pre-Idol demo albums included several selections of Contemporary Christian Music (or CCM) and gospel songs. A performance of the Commodores' "Jesus is Love" at the American Music Awards in 2003 earned Aiken and Ruben Studdard a standing ovation. Aiken has sung a few CCM songs at his pop concerts and has made Christmas albums, Christmas television specials and performances, and Christmas tours essential elements of his career.

Aiken makes it clear that he is aware not everyone shares his religious beliefs and it is not his intention to press these beliefs on others. When he worked as a camp counselor at the YMCA, he challenged other camp faculty by insisting that singing "overtly Christian songs" was inappropriate, as some of the kids were Jewish. "I stood firm ... no child is going to have a spiritual crisis on my watch." His public philosophy, geared towards inclusion and service to others, reflects his stance that decisions about religion should be made at home.

== Discography ==
=== Studio albums ===
- Measure of a Man (2003)
- Merry Christmas with Love (2004)
- A Thousand Different Ways (2006)
- On My Way Here (2008)
- Tried and True (2010)
- Steadfast (2012)
- Christmas Bells Are Ringing (2024)
- Rewind (2026)

=== EPs ===
- All Is Well (2006)

=== Compilations ===
- The Very Best of Clay Aiken (2009)
- A Thousand Different Ways/Measure of a Man (2010)

=== DVDs ===
- A Clay Aiken Christmas (2004)
- Tried and True Live (2010)

== Filmography ==
- Clay Aiken: Invisible (2003)
- Ed (2003)
- Scrubs (2005)
- All My Children (2005)
- 30 Rock (2009)
- Phineas and Ferb (2010)
- Hoarders: Untold Stories Tori (2011)
- Drop Dead Diva (2011)
- The Office (2013)
- Law & Order: Special Victims Unit (2013)
- The Runner-up (2015)
- Sandy Wexler (2017)
- Sharknado 5: Global Swarming (2017)
- New Dogs, Old Tricks (2018)
- Chad Goes Deep (2019)

== Awards and nominations ==
Award	Year	Nominee(s)	Category	Result	Ref.
American Music Awards	2003	Himself	Fan's Choice Award	Won	
American Music Awards	2003	Himself	Favorite Pop/Rock Male Artist	Nominated	
Teen Choice Awards	2003	Himself	Choice Reality/Variety TV Star: Male	Nominated	
Teen Choice Awards	2004	Himself	Choice Male Artist	Nominated	
Teen Choice Awards	2004	Himself	Choice Breakout Music Artist	Nominated	

=== Professional ===
Billboard Awards

- 2003: Won – Best Selling Single of 2003 – "Bridge Over Troubled Water/This Is The Night"
- 2004: Won – Best Selling Christmas Album – Merry Christmas with Love
- 2004: Won – Best Selling Christian Album – Merry Christmas with Love
- 2005: Won – Best Selling Christian Album – Merry Christmas with Love

New Music Weekly Awards

- 2004: Won – Top 40 Male Artist of the Year

American Christian Music Awards

- 2005: Won – Outstanding Yule CD – Merry Christmas with Love

=== Achievement ===
- 2005 Robert M. Barg Memorial Achievement Award
- 2006 UNC Charlotte Alumni Association Outstanding Young Alumnus Award
- 2007 National Center for Learning Disabilities' Children's Advocacy Award
- 2009 The Family Circle Award from the Family Equality Council

== See also ==
- List of artists who reached number one on the Hot 100 (U.S.)
- List of Decca Records artists
- List of number-one hits (United States)
- List of UNICEF Goodwill Ambassadors
