= Playlist: The Very Best of Ruben Studdard =

Greatest hits album by Ruben Studdard
- Released: January 26, 2010
- Genre: R&B, gospel, pop
- Length: 59:39
- Label: Sony Legacy

Ruben Studdard chronology
Love Is (2009)	Playlist: The Very Best of Ruben Studdard (2010)	Letters from Birmingham (2012)

Playlist: The Very Best of Ruben Studdard is a compilation of recordings by singer Ruben Studdard. It is part of a series of similar Playlist albums issued on the Legacy label by Sony Music Entertainment.

The album, released on January 26, 2010, includes selections from Studdard's first four studio albums. A PDF file included on the CD contains the song credits, photographs, and liner notes.

== Track listing ==
1. "I Can't Help It" (Susaye Greene, Stevie Wonder) - 4:05
2. "Together" (Mikkel S. Eriksen, Tor Erik Hermansen, Phillip Taj Jackson, Martin Kleveland) - 4:25
3. "Just Because" (Larry Addison) - 4:11
4. "The Return (Of the Velvet Teddy Bear)" (Kevin Cates, Kenneth Gamble, Leon Huff, Harold Lilly) - 4:14
5. "Make Ya Feel Beautiful" (Shaffer Smith, SheaTaylor) - 3:29
6. "Change Me" (Luke Boyd, Antonio Dixon, Harvey Mason, Jr., Steve Russell, Tank, Damon Thomas) -3:51
7. "I Need an Angel" (R. Kelly) - 4:53
8. "Goin’ Up Yonder" (Walter Hawkins) - 3:42
9. "Restoration" (Marvin Winans) - 4:01
10. "Sorry 2004" (Eric Dawkins, Tony Dixon, Ronnie Jackson, Harvey Mason, Jr., Damon Thomas) - 4:23
11. "For All We Know" (J. Fred Coots, Lewis, Sam) - 3:42
12. "Flying Without Wings" (Wayne Hector, Steve Mac) - 3:45
13. "Center of my Joy" (Gloria Gaither, Bill Gaither, Richard Smallwood) - 5:54
14. "Superstar" (Bonnie Bramlett, Leon Russell) - 5:03

== Reception ==
Professional ratings
Review scores
Source	Rating
Allmusic	3/5 stars

This album failed to chart and sold a total of 1,000 copies.
