= The Biggest Loser season 16 =

The Biggest Loser
- Season 16
- No. of episodes: 18

Release
- Original network: NBC
- Original release: September 11, 2014 – January 29, 2015

Season chronology
- ← Previous; Season 15 (Second Chances 2) Next → Season 17 (Temptation Nation)

The Biggest Loser: Glory Days is the sixteenth season of The Biggest Loser which premiered on September 11, 2014, on NBC. Bob Harper and Dolvett Quince returned as trainers, while Jillian Michaels decided to leave the show. There are two new trainers this season: Jessie Pavelka and Jennifer Widerstrom. This season, the contestants are all former athletes including former National Football League players and Olympic Gold medalists. The contestants competed to win a $250,000 prize which was awarded to Toma Dobrosavljevic, the contestant with the highest percentage of weight loss.

This season was also the last to be hosted by Alison Sweeney, who left to focus on other projects.

== Contestants ==
Name	Teams	Switched teams	Singles	Status	Total votes
Zina Garrison, 51, Hyattsville, Maryland	Not Chosen	—N/a	—N/a	Eliminated Week 1	^{[C]}
Vanessa Hayden, 32, Orlando, Florida	Not Chosen	—N/a	—N/a	Eliminated Week 2	^{[C]}
Andrea Wilamowski, 43, Grosse Pointe Farms, Michigan	Blue Team	—N/a	—N/a	Eliminated Week 3	3
Emmy Lou Munoz, 32, Woodson, Texas	Red Team	—N/a	—N/a	Eliminated Week 4	3
Chandra Maple, 26, Dodge City, Kansas	Blue Team	—N/a	—N/a	Eliminated Week 5	2
Mike Murburg, 58, Pasco County, Florida	Red Team	—N/a	—N/a	Eliminated Week 6	3
Matthew "Matt" Miller, 31, Grove, Oklahoma	White Team	—N/a	—N/a	Eliminated Week 7	^{[R]}
Gina Haddon, 41, Rowlett, Texas	Blue Team	—N/a	—N/a	Eliminated Week 8	^{[R]}
Blake Benge, 19, San Clemente, California	Red Team	—N/a	—N/a	Eliminated Week 9	^{[R]}
Jackie Pierson, 36, Pacifica, California	Blue Team	—N/a	—N/a	Eliminated Week 10	^{[R]}
Rondalee Beardslee, 28, New Lothrop, Michigan	White Team	White Team	—N/a	Eliminated Week 11	^{[R]}
Damien Woody, 37, Mendham Borough, New Jersey	Blue Team	—N/a	—N/a	Eliminated Week 12	^{[R]}
John "JJ" O'Malley, 22, Scottsdale, Arizona	White Team	Blue Team	Maroon	Eliminated Week 13	3
Jordan Alicandro, 32, Surrey, British Columbia	Red Team	Blue Team	Grey	Eliminated Week 14	^{[R]}
Scott Mitchell, 47, Mapleton, Utah	Red Team	White Team	—N/a	Eliminated Week 15	4
Howard "Woody" Carter, Returned Week 16	White Team	Blue Team	Aqua	Comeback Canyon Winner	^{[R]}
Lori Harrigan-Mack, 44, Las Vegas, Nevada	Blue Team	White Team	Gold	Eliminated Week 16	^{[R]}
Howard "Woody" Carter, 46, Las Vegas, Nevada	White Team	Blue Team	Black	Re-Eliminated Week 17	^{[R]}
Rob Guiry, 26, Springfield, Massachusetts	Red Team	Red Team	Green	2nd Runner-up	
Sonya Jones, 40, Springfield, Illinois	White Team	Red Team	Purple	Runner-up	
Toma Dobrosavljevic, 33, Addison, Illinois	White Team	Red Team	Orange	Biggest Loser	

The "Total Votes" column indicates the number of votes cast against the contestant when he/she was eliminated.
^[Q] This contestant quit the competition.
^[R] This contestant fell below the Red Line, and was eliminated without any votes.
^[E1] This contestant lost a weigh-in and was eliminated without any votes, due to having the lower percentage of weight loss on a team with just two remaining contestants.
^[C] This contestant was eliminated due to losing an Elimination Challenge.

== Weigh-ins ==
Contestants are listed in reverse chronological order of elimination.

Contestant	Age	Height	Starting BMI	Ending BMI	Starting weight	Week																Semi- final	Finale	Weight lost	Percentage lost
Contestant	Age	Height	Starting BMI	Ending BMI	Starting weight	1	2	3	4	5	6	7	8	9	10	11	12	13	14	15	16	Semi- final	Finale	Weight lost	Percentage lost
Toma	33	5'9"	49.6	24.4	336	316	308	302	291	282	275	271	263	255	246	247	235	225	217	216	202	199	165	171	50.89%
Sonya	40	5'5"	47.1	23.1	283	260	253	249	240	234	227	221	215	206	200	197	189	183	178	175	169	163	139	144	50.88%
Rob	26	6'4"	58.8	29.8	483	450	438	433	421	416	405	396	387	374	366	365	350	338	332	330	315	302	245	238	49.27%
Woody	46	6'2"	51.1	35.2	398	388	376	372	361	354	346	342	335	332	317	315	306	294	291	285	274	270	274	124	31.16%
Lori	44	6'1"	39.7	27.7	301	292	287	284	276	267	263	258	255	249	245	243	240	230	227	226	220		210	91	30.23%
Scott	47	6'6"	42.3	28.4	366	343	333	322	315	302	295	288	283	277	268	268	259	251	242	240			246	120	32.79%
Jordan	32	5'10"	46.3	25.8	323	301	293	289	279	272	266	259	253	248	246	242	233	227	219				180	143	44.27%
JJ	22	6'3"	49.0	28.1	392	378	366	363	347	342	335	328	321	317	309	306	300	292					225	167	42.60%
Damien	37	6'3"	48.5	37.0	388	381	367	358	344	338	331	326	317	314	306	295	293						296	92	23.71%
Rondalee	28	5'10"	40.2	26.8	280	266	258	255	250	242	236	234	231	224	221	217							187	93	33.21%
Jackie	36	5'10"	41.8	32.3	291	283	273	271	267	259	254	252	249	243	239								225	66	22.68%
Blake	19	5'4"	43.1	26.4	251	235	227	224	216	209	204	199	196	195									154	97	38.64%
Gina	41	5'6"	39.1	28.6	242	228	222	221	217	210	207	204	202										177	65	26.86%
Matt	31	6'3"	48.2	28.9	386	363	353	346	336	333	317	315											231	155	40.16%
Mike	58	6'3"	49.9	31.1	399	361	352	343	333	326	315												249	150	37.59%
Chandra	26	6'0"	46.2	36.6	341	334	325	324	317	313													270	71	20.82%
Emmy	32	5'6"	42.0	34.2	260	254	249	243	239														212	48	18.46%
Andrea	43	5'5"	40.6	29.0	244	230	224	220															174	70	28.69%
Vanessa	32	6'4"	44.6	36.4	366	352	347																299	67	18.31%
Zina	51	5'5"	43.8	37.6	263	255																	226	37	14.07%

- In Week 6, Sonya was The Biggest Loser on the ranch, but Matt had the highest percentage of weight loss overall at Comeback Canyon.
- In Week 11, Jordan was The Biggest Loser on the ranch, but Damien had the highest percentage of weight loss overall at Comeback Canyon.
- In Week 14, Toma was The Biggest Loser on the ranch, but Scott had the highest percentage of weight loss overall at Comeback Canyon.
- In Week 15, Sonya was The Biggest Loser on the ranch, but Woody had the highest percentage of weight loss overall at Comeback Canyon.
- Woody Carter originally wore an aqua colored shirt during Singles until he was eliminated in Week 14. When he returned as the Comeback contestant, he was wearing black.

Teams
Jessie's Team
Jen's Team
Dolvett's Team
Bob's Original players

Standings
Week's Biggest Loser (Team or Individuals)
Week's Biggest Loser and Immunity
Week's Biggest Loser and at Comeback Canyon
Week's Biggest Loser on Ranch in the event that the biggest loser is currently at Comeback Canyon
Immunity (Challenge or Weigh-in)
Results from At-Home or Comeback Canyon Players
Contestant Withdraws before Weigh-In

BMI
Underweight (less than 18.5 BMI)
Normal (18.5 – 24.9 BMI)
Overweight (25 – 29.9 BMI)
Obese Class I (30 – 34.9 BMI)
Obese Class II (35 – 39.9 BMI)
Obese Class III (greater than 40 BMI)

Winners
$250,000 Winner (among the finalists)
$100,000 Winner (among the eliminated contestants)

=== Weigh-in difference history ===
Contestant	Week																Semi- final	Finale
Contestant	1	2	3	4	5	6	7	8	9	10	11	12	13	14	15	16	Semi- final	Finale
Toma	−20	−8	−6	−11	−9	−7	−4	−8	−8	−9	+1	−12	−10	−8	−1	−14	−3	−34
Sonya	−23	−7	−4	−9	−6	−7	−6	−6	−9	−6	−3	−8	−6	−5	−3	−6	−6	−24
Rob	−33	−12	−5	−12	−5	−11	−9	−9	−13	−8	−1	−15	−12	−6	−2	−15	−13	−57
Woody	−10	−12	−4	−11	−7	−8	−4	−7	−3	−15	−2	−9	−12	−3	-6	−11	−4	+4
Lori	−9	−5	−3	−8	−9	−4	−5	−3	−6	−4	−2	−3	−10	−3	−1	−6	-10	
Scott	−23	−10	−11	−7	−13	−7	−7	−5	−6	−9	0	-9	-8	-9	-2	+6		
Jordan	−22	−8	−4	−10	−7	−6	−7	−6	−5	−2	−4	−9	−6	-8	-39			
JJ	−14	−12	−3	−16	−5	−7	−7	−7	−4	−8	−3	−6	-8	-67				
Damien	−7	−14	−9	−14	−6	−7	−5	−9	−3	-8	-11	-2	+3					
Rondalee	−14	−8	−3	−5	−8	−6	−2	−3	−7	−3	-4	-30						
Jackie	−8	−10	−2	−4	−8	−5	−2	-3	-6	-4	-14							
Blake	−16	−8	−3	−8	−7	−5	−5	−3	-1	-41								
Gina	−14	−6	−1	−4	−7	−3	-3	-2	-25									
Matt	−23	−10	−7	−10	−3	-16	-2	-84										
Mike	−38	−9	−9	−10	-7	-11	-66											
Chandra	−7	−9	−1	-7	-4	-43												
Emmy	−6	−5	-6	-4	-27													
Andrea	−14	-6	-4	-46														
Vanessa	-14	-5	-48															
Zina	-8	-29																

- Toma's 12 pound weight loss in week 12 was displayed as −11 due to the weight he gained last week.
- Lori's 3 pound weight loss in week 14 was displayed as −4 due to her 1-pound advantage from the challenge.
- Toma's 14 pound weight loss in week 16 was displayed as −15 due to his 1-pound advantage from the challenge.
- Toma's 3 pound weight loss in week 17 was displayed as −4 due to his 1-pound advantage from the challenge.

=== Weigh-in percentages history ===
Contestant	Week																Semi- final	Finale
Contestant	1	2	3	4	5	6	7	8	9	10	11	12	13	14	15	16	Semi- final	Finale
Toma	−5.95%	−2.53%	−1.95%	−3.64%	−3.09%	−2.48%	−1.45%	−2.95%	−3.04%	−3.53%	+0.41%	−4.86%	−4.26%	−3.56%	−0.46%	−6.48%	−1.49%	−17.09%
Sonya	−8.13%	−2.69%	−1.58%	−3.61%	−2.50%	−2.99%	−2.64%	−2.71%	−4.19%	−2.91%	−1.50%	−4.06%	−3.17%	−2.73%	−1.69%	−3.43%	−3.55%	−14.72%
Rob	−6.83%	−2.67%	−1.14%	−2.77%	−1.19%	−2.64%	−2.22%	−2.27%	−3.36%	−2.13%	−0.27%	−4.11%	−3.43%	−1.78%	−0.60%	−4.55%	−4.13%	−18.87%
Woody	−2.51%	−3.09%	−1.06%	−2.96%	−1.94%	−2.26%	−1.16%	−2.05%	−0.90%	−4.52%	−0.63%	−2.86%	−3.92%	−1.02%	-2.06%	−3.86%	−1.46%	+1.48%
Lori	−2.99%	−1.71%	−1.05%	−2.82%	−3.26%	−1.50%	−1.90%	−1.16%	−2.35%	−1.61%	−0.82%	−1.23%	−4.17%	−1.30%	−0.44%	−2.65%	-4.55%	
Scott	−6.28%	−2.92%	−3.30%	−2.17%	−4.13%	−2.32%	−2.37%	−1.74%	−2.12%	−3.25%	0.00%	-3.36%	-3.09%	-3.59%	-0.83%	+2.50%		
Jordan	−6.81%	−2.66%	−1.37%	−3.46%	−2.51%	−2.21%	−2.63%	−2.32%	−1.98%	−0.80%	−1.63%	−3.72%	−2.58%	-3.52%	-17.81%			
JJ	−3.57%	−3.17%	−0.82%	−4.41%	−1.44%	−2.05%	−2.09%	−2.13%	−1.24%	−2.52%	−0.97%	−1.96%	-2.67%	-22.95%				
Damien	−1.80%	−3.67%	−2.45%	−3.91%	−1.74%	−2.07%	−1.51%	−2.76%	−0.94%	-2.55%	-3.59%	-0.68%	+1.02%					
Rondalee	−5.00%	−3.01%	−1.16%	−1.96%	−3.20%	−2.48%	−0.85%	−1.28%	−3.03%	−1.34%	-1.81%	-13.82%						
Jackie	−2.75%	−3.53%	−0.73%	−1.48%	−3.00%	−1.93%	−0.79%	-1.19%	-2.41%	-1.65%	-5.86%							
Blake	−6.37%	−3.40%	−1.32%	−3.57%	−3.24%	−2.39%	−2.45%	−1.51%	-0.51%	-21.03%								
Gina	−5.79%	−2.63%	−0.45%	−1.81%	−3.23%	−1.43%	-1.45%	-0.98%	-12.38%									
Matt	−5.96%	−2.75%	−1.98%	−2.89%	−0.89%	-4.80%	-0.69%	-26.67%										
Mike	−9.52%	−2.49%	−2.56%	−2.92%	-2.10%	-3.37%	-20.95%											
Chandra	−2.05%	−2.69%	−0.31%	-2.16%	-1.26%	-13.79%												
Emmy	−2.31%	−1.97%	-2.41%	-1.65%	-11.30%													
Andrea	−5.74%	-2.61%	-1.79%	-20.41%														
Vanessa	-3.83%	-1.42%	-13.83%															
Zina	-3.04%	-11.37%																

- Toma's 4.86% in week 12 was displayed as 4.47% due to the weight he gained the previous week.
- Lori's 1.30% in week 14 was displayed as 1.74% due to her 1-pound advantage from the challenge.
- Toma's 6.48% in week 16 was displayed as 6.94% due to his 1-pound advantage from the challenge.
- Toma's 1.49% in week 17 was displayed as 1.98% due to his 1-pound advantage from the challenge.

== Reception ==
=== U.S. Nielsen ratings ===
Order	Episode Title	Airdate	Timeslot (EST)	Rating/Share (18–49)	Viewers (millions)	Rank (timeslot)	Rank (night)
1	"Opening Day"	September 11, 2014	Thursday 8:00 PM	1.6/5	5.40	2	3
2	"The Knockout"	September 18, 2014	Thursday 8:00 PM	1.3/5	4.62	2	3
3	"Double Header"	September 25, 2014	Thursday 8:00 PM	1.3/4	4.47	4	7
4	"The Lottery"	October 2, 2014	Thursday 8:00 PM	1.3/4	4.64	4	6
5	"Sidelined"	October 9, 2014	Thursday 8:00 PM	1.2/4	4.57	4	8
6	"The Tailgate"	October 16, 2014	Thursday 8:00 PM	1.3/4	4.66	4	7
7	"The Drop"	October 23, 2014	Thursday 8:00 PM	1.2/4	4.58	3	6
8	"Penalty Box"	October 30, 2014	Thursday 8:00 PM	1.1/4	4.42	4	9
9	"Yes, Coach!"	November 6, 2014	Thursday 8:00 PM	1.2/4	4.34	4	10
10	"Free Agents"	November 13, 2014	Thursday 8:00 PM	1.2/4	4.52	4	8
11	"No 'I' In Team"	November 20, 2014	Thursday 8:00 PM	1.0/3	4.37	4	9
12	"The Playoffs"	December 11, 2014	Thursday 8:00 PM	1.1/4	4.30	3	7
13	"Kauai, Part 1"	December 18, 2014	Thursday 8:00 PM	0.9/3	3.89	2	6
14	"Kauai, Part 2"	January 1, 2015	Thursday 8:00 PM	0.9/3	3.55	2	4
15	"Makeover Week"	January 8, 2015	Thursday 8:00 PM	1.3/4	5.09	3	7
16	"The Comeback"	January 15, 2015	Thursday 8:00 PM	1.1/4	4.23	3	7
17	"End Zone"	January 22, 2015	Thursday 8:00 PM	1.2/4	4.48	3	9
18	"Finale"	January 29, 2015	Thursday 8:00 PM	1.4/4	5.37	4	8

== See also ==
- The Biggest Loser (American TV series)
- The Biggest Loser
