= Reagan Gomez-Preston =

American actress (born 1980)

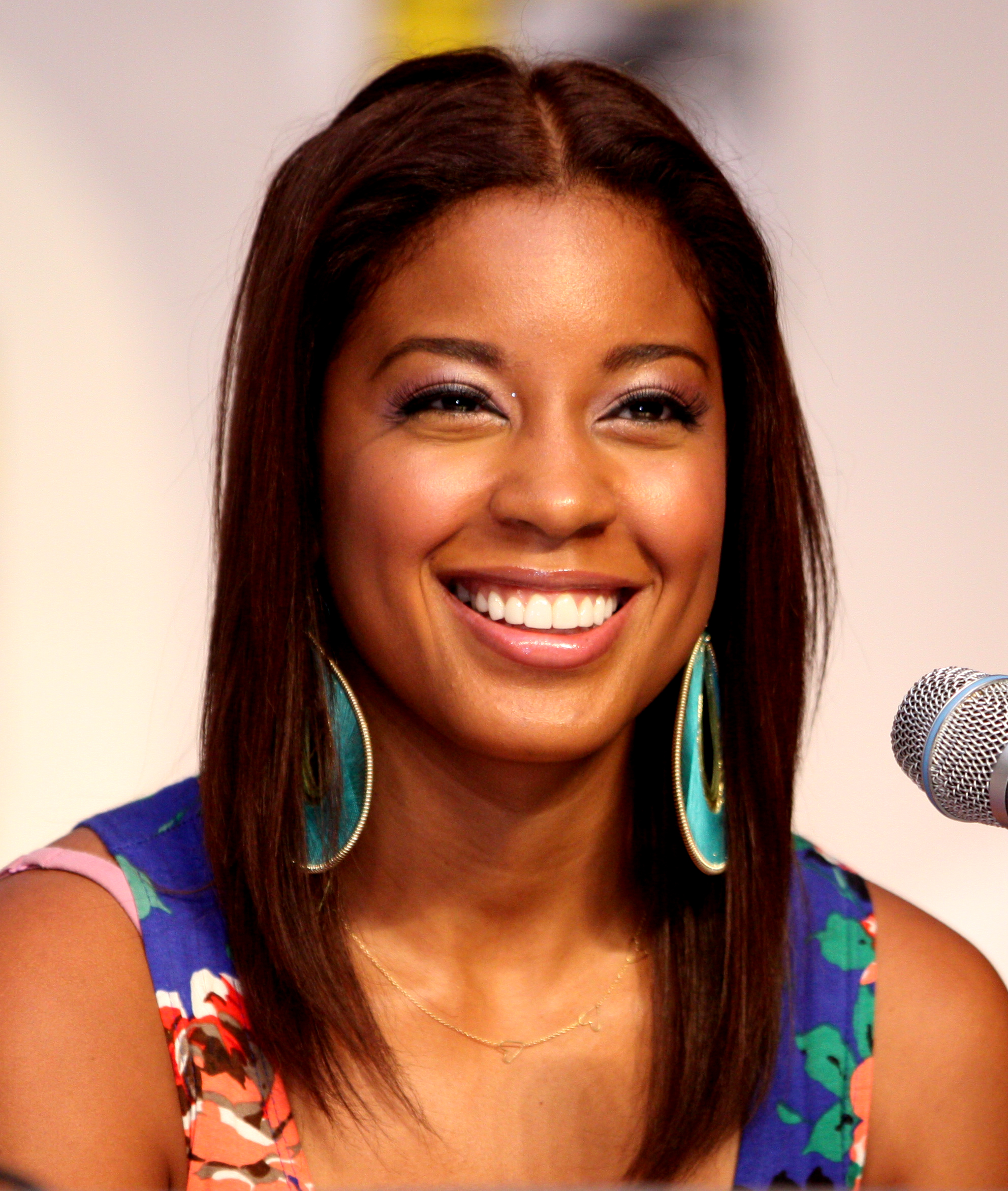
- Gomez-Preston at the 2010 San Diego Comic-Con
- Born: April 24, 1980 (age 46); Detroit, Michigan, U.S.
- Occupation: Actress
- Years active: 1994–present
- Spouse: DeWayne Turrentine (m. 1999)
- Children: 2

Reagan Gomez-Preston (born April 24, 1980) is an American television, film and voice actress. She is known for her roles as Zaria Peterson on The WB sitcom The Parent 'Hood (1995–1999) and Roberta Tubbs on the FOX animated comedy The Cleveland Show (2009–2013). Gomez-Preston also starred in the short-lived UPN sitcom Love, Inc. in the 2005–2006 season as Francine.

== Early life ==
Gomez-Preston was born in Detroit, Michigan to a Puerto Rican mother, Cheryl Gomez and an African American father, Dr. Bennett Preston. She has a younger brother named Kyle.

When Gomez-Preston was young, her mother worked for the Detroit Police Department. Due to verbal abuse, written racist epithets, death threats, and a commanding officer expressing interest in a relationship with her, she filed a sexual harassment suit against the Detroit Police Department, which she won, receiving an award somewhere between $800,000 and $1.2 million. After this Cheryl Gomez moved the family to Little Rock, Arkansas, then to Philadelphia. In Philadelphia, Gomez-Preston was enrolled in acting, dancing, and singing lessons at Philadelphia's Freedom Theatre.

== Career ==
At 14 years old, Gomez-Preston began her acting career in The WB sitcom The Parent 'Hood, as Zaria Peterson. She guest starred on UPN's One on One as Flex's younger sister/Breanna's aunt, Bernadette. Also, she was a guest host of the weekly music series Soul Train, aired in December 1995. She also played Francine opposite Holly Robinson Peete in the short-lived UPN sitcom, Love Inc. She is also a former cast member of Nickelodeon's The Amanda Show. She has been featured in King magazine twice, first in the September/October 2003 issue, and again in the December 2006/January 2007 issue. She was one out of five cover girls in her second appearance. She also appeared in music videos such as "Sorry 2004" by Ruben Studdard, "No Better Love" by Young Gunz, and "Whatever You Like" by T.I.

Gomez-Preston is a writer of feature films, with her own business and production company. She voiced Roberta Tubbs (replacing actress Nia Long), Cleveland Brown's stepdaughter on the FOX animated sitcom The Cleveland Show from 2009 until the show's cancellation in 2013. Since Cleveland returned to Family Guy in the 2014 episode "He's Bla-ack!", Roberta has not had a single line.

She had a recurring voice-over role as the twin sisters Jenny and Kiki Pizza on the animated Cartoon Network television series Steven Universe and in 2016, she began a recurring role on the OWN television drama Queen Sugar as Chantal Williams.

== Personal life ==
Gomez-Preston began dating model DeWayne Turrentine in 1995. Turrentine was a member of the hip hop duo Quo. The couple married on November 10, 1999. They have two children, a daughter named Scarlett Annette Turrentine (born May 13, 2007) and a son named Tyger Attila Turrentine (born April 2, 2011).

== Filmography ==
=== Film ===
Year	Title	Role	Notes
1995	Freaky Friday	Heather	Television film
1996	Jerry Maguire	Tidwell's Cousin	
2001	Carmen: A Hip Hopera	Caela	Television film
2002	Dead Above Ground	Latrisha McDermont	
2003	Love Don't Co$t a Thing	Olivia	
2004	Never Die Alone	Juanita	
2004	Doing Hard Time	Rayvon Jones	Video
2004	Hair Show	Fiona	
2004	Trois: The Escort	Lena	Video
2005	Beauty Shop	Woman	
2009	Dough Boys	Beauty	
2009	Sweet Justice	Asia Sterling	
2010	A Gangland Love Story	Julia	
2010	Kiss the Bride	Robin	Video
2010	This Time	Cheyenne	Short
2012	Dysfunctional Friends	Ebony	
2012	What Goes Around Comes Around	Desirae	Video
2012	If You Really Love Me	-	Television film
2013	Love Will Keep Us Together	Tao	Television film
2018	Couples' Night	Kia	
2019	Dear Santa, I Need a Date	Janelle Vaughn	Television film
2025	Absolute Dominion	Claudia	
2025	Unexpected Christmas	Kerry	

=== Television ===
Year	Title	Role	Notes
1995–1999	The Parent 'Hood	Zaria Peterson	Main role
1996	Moesha	Geneva	Episode: "Hakeem's New Flame"
1997	Smart Guy	Nina Duperley	Episode: "Love Letters"
1998	Cousin Skeeter	Binaqua	Episode: "Blast from the Past"
1999	Undressed	Jackie	Recurring role, season 1
1999	Felicity	Student	Episode: "Ancient History"
2000	Martial Law	Mary	Episode: "Scorpio Rising"
2000	The Amanda Show	Shelia	Episode: "Episode #2.39"
2001	That '70s Show	Melissa	Episode: "Hyde Gets the Girl"
2002	Strong Medicine	Briette	Episode: "Trauma"
2002	Off Centre	Sherry	Episode: "The Deflower Half-Hour"
2003	One on One	Bernadette	Episode: "Daddy's Other Girl"
2003	ER	Gayla	Episode: "No Strings Attached"
2003	JAG	Cassie Dupree	Episode: "Pulse Rate"
2004	She Spies	Kanesha Hamilton	Episode: "The Gift"
2005–2006	Love, Inc.	Francine	Main cast
2007	'Til Death	Deb	Episode: "Performance Anxiety"
2010–2013	The Cleveland Show	Roberta Tubbs	Voice, main role
2011–2014	Love That Girl!	Jasmine Russell	Guest: season 2, recurring cast: season 4
2012	The Soul Man	Renee	Episode: "How to Be a Church Lady"
2013–2014	Almost Home	Lisa	Main cast
2014	Rick and Morty	Jessica's Friend	Voice, episode: "Rick Potion No. 9"
2014–2019	Steven Universe	Jenny Pizza, Kiki Pizza	Voice, recurring role
2015	Instant Mom	Rhonda	Episode: "How You Bike Me Now"
2016–2022	Queen Sugar	Chantal Williams	Recurring role season 1, guest role seasons 2, 4, and 7
2019	Infinity Train	Mikayla	Voice, 2 episodes
2021	A Black Lady Sketch Show	Debate Moderator	Episode: "Way to Ruin the Party, Soya!"
2021	Black Monday	Henrietta	Episode: "Eight!"
2021	Ten Year Old Tom	Mrs. Munoz	Voice, 2 episodes
2025	Rick and Morty	Alien, additional voices	Episode: "The Curicksous Case of Bethjamin Button"
2025	The Chi	Candice	Recurring role, Seasons 6–8

=== Music videos ===
Year	Title	Artist
2004	"No Better Love"	Young Gunz
2004	"Sorry 2004"	Ruben Studdard
2008	"Whatever You Like"	T.I.

== See also ==
- List of Afro-Latinos
