= The Return (Ruben Studdard album) =

Studio album by Ruben Studdard
- Released: October 17, 2006
- Genre: R&B
- Length: 50:19
- Labels: J; 19
- Producers: Kevin Cates; Jim Jonsin; Harold Lilly; Happy Perez; James Poyser; Steve Russell; Stargate; Michael "Flyte" Stuckey; Ruben Studdard; The Underdogs; Vudu

Ruben Studdard chronology
I Need An Angel (2004)	The Return (2006)	Love Is (2009)

The Return is the third studio album by American R&B artist Ruben Studdard. It was released on October 17, 2006, by J Records. A return to the R&B sounds of his debut album Soulful (2003), following his 2004 release, the gospel album I Need an Angel, Studdard reteamed with production duo The Underdogs and producer Harold Lilly to work on the album, while additional production was provided by Jim Jonsin, James Poyser, Steve Russell, and Stargate, among others.

The album was met with mixed reviews from critics who complained about the production and Studdard's performance but enjoyed his voice. The Return debuted and peaked at number 8 on the US Billboard 200 with first week sales of 71,000 copies. It was preceded by lead single "Change Me", which was released on July 31, 2006 and became his second number one hit on the US Adult R&B Songs chart. The Return would become Studdard's final album with J Records, after departing the label in 2007.

== Critical reception ==
Professional ratings
Review scores
Source	Rating
About.com	2.5/5 stars
AllMusic	2/5 stars
Entertainment Weekly	B
People	2.5/4 stars
USA Today	2.5/4 stars

The album received mixed reviews from music critics. AllMusic senior editor Stephen Thomas Erlewine found Studdard's performance throughout the album to be lazy with no melodies guiding him, concluding that "when combined with the dull productions, the results are deadly boring." About.com's Mark Edward Nero was also critical of Studdard's voice, saying that it had "no potency much of the time and almost sounds as generic as the vocals that accompany elevator music."

Jody Rosen of Entertainment Weekly was more positive, saying that "The production's bland, but his sweet singing carries the day." Chuck Arnold and Ralph Novak from People found that the "plus-size smoothie brings the most emotional heft to slow jams that show off his sensitive side, such as the first single "Change Me" and the Luther-like "Rather Just Not Know." But the hip-hop-tinged tracks fail to keep pace, especially when Studdard tries to get studly on the pseudo-thuggish "To Da Crib." R. Kelly he's not."

== Commercial performance ==
The album debuted and peaked at number eight in the Billboard 200, with 71,000 copies sold in its first week of release. It also reached number two on the Top R&B/Hip-Hop Albums. In March 2009, Billboard reported that the album had sold 238,000 copies by then.

== Controversy ==
Sony Music was accused of the unauthorized use of Louis Vuitton's copyrighted Toile as part of the disc's design. An undisclosed settlement was reached between Sony and LVMH, the parent company of Louis Vuitton.

== Track listing ==
The Return track listing
No.	Title	Writer(s)	Producer(s)	Length
1.	"The Return (Of the Velvet Teddy Bear)"	Harold Lilly; Kevin Cates; Kenneth Gamble; Leon Huff	Lilly; Cates	4:14
2.	"Change Me"	Harvey Mason, Jr.; Damon Thomas; Steve Russell; Durrell Babbs; Antonio Dixon; Luke James	The Underdogs	3:50
3.	"Make Ya Feel Beautiful"	Shea Taylor; Shaffer Smith	Taylor	3:27
4.	"Get U Loose"	Mason, Jr.; Thomas; Russell; Boyd; Babbs	Russell	3:54
5.	"Our Story"	James Poyser; Lilly	Poyser	3:50
6.	"One Side"	Lilly; Mikkel S. Eriksen; Tor Erik Hermansen	Stargate; Lilly^{[a]}	3:55
7.	"What tha Business Is"	Scott Storch; Jason Boyd	Storch; Boyd^{[a]}	3:26
8.	"Rather Just Not Know"	Smith; Nathan Perez; Steve-O Valdez	Happy Perez	3:38
9.	"Ain't No Party"	Lilly; Cainon Lamb	Lilly	3:40
10.	"Listen to Ya Heart"	Matthew McAllister; Lilly; Antoine Carraby; Yomo Smith; Eric Wright; Mark Green; Bryon McCane; Charles Scruggs; Anthony Henderson; Steven Howse; Stanley Howse	Vudu	3:35
11.	"I'm Not Happy"	Lilly; Ruben Studdard; James Scheffer; Frank Romano; Calvin Puckett	Jim Jonsin	4:09
12.	"To Da Crib"	Studdard; Cates; Johnathan Effinger	Cates	3:33
13.	"Blow Ya Mind"	Studdard; Michael "Flyte" Stuckey	Stuckey	3:02

Bonus track
No.	Title	Writer(s)	Producer(s)	Length
14.	"If Only for One Night"	Brenda Russell	Studdard	3:46

Notes

- ^{^[a]} signifies a co-producer
- "Change Me", features additional background vocals by Steve Russell and Tank.
- "Get U Loose", features additional background vocals by Steve Russell and Tank.
- "Ain't No Party", features additional background vocals by Mocha.

Sample credits

- "The Return (Of the Velvet Teddy Bear)" samples "You're The Reason Why" as performed by The Ebonys.
- "Listen to Ya Heart" contains a portion of "Foe tha Love of $" as performed by Bone Thugs-n-Harmony featuring Eazy-E.

== Personnel ==
Adapted from The Return liner notes.

- Chris Gehringer: mastering (Sterling Sound, NYC)
- Anita Marisa Boriboon: art direction and design
- Christian Lantry: photographer
- Vincent "VJ" Lake: stylist
- Mylah Morales: grooming
- Chris LeBeau: photoshoot production
- Bre Scullark: cover model

== Charts ==
Weekly chart performance for The Return
Chart (2006)	Peak position
US Billboard 200	8
US Top R&B/Hip-Hop Albums (Billboard)	2
