= Love Is (Ruben Studdard album) =

Studio album by Ruben Studdard
- Released: May 19, 2009
- Length: 47:52
- Labels: Hickory; RED
- Producers: Nat Adderley, Jr.; Warryn Campbell; John Jackson; Jimmy Jam and Terry Lewis; Martin K; John Rich; Stargate; Syience

Ruben Studdard chronology
The Return (2006)	Love Is (2009)	Playlist: The Very Best of Ruben Studdard (2010)

Singles from Love Is
- 1. "Together" Released: March 26, 2009; 2. "Don't Make 'Em Like U No More" Released: December 2009

Love Is is the fourth studio album by America singer Ruben Studdard. It was released by Hickory Records on May 19, 2009. The album debuted and peaked at number 36 in the Billboard 200, with 15,000 copies sold in its first week of release. It featured production from Jimmy Jam and Terry Lewis and Stargate. The first single, "Together", was released on March 26, 2009. It exists a leaked demo - version of the song, which has caused a lot of debate. It's the writer of the song, Taj Jackson, who is singing it, and not Lee Carr or Ne-Yo. The album features original songs but also includes a few covers, such as Michael Jackson's "I Can't Help It" and Extreme's "More Than Words".

== Critical reception ==
Professional ratings
Review scores
Source	Rating
About.com	2.5/5 stars
AllMusic	3/5 stars
Entertainment Weekly	B+

Stephen Thomas Erlewine of AllMusic reviewed, "These are songs of longtime relationships, not new love, and the music is appropriately settled, grounded in quiet storm but drifting into adult contemporary all of which helps give the album a bit of a retro-vibe... This could be called resignation, but it's really an acceptance of what Ruben Studdard's peculiar strengths are: he's a smooth soul singer... it's so relaxed it can sometimes be sleepy and Ruben's upper register, which he relies upon too much, can sometimes seem whiny—but as a whole this is the best recorded representation of Ruben's talents to date."

Mikael Wood of Entertainment Weekly noted, "The bear-huggable American Idol champ is in predictably fine voice on his fourth studio set, a romance-themed mix of crafty originals and sturdy covers (including The Long and Winding Road). Yet Ruben Studdard also takes some unexpected stylistic chances here."

Jonathan Takiff of the Philadelphia Daily News gave the disc a B+ grade, writing that "[p]roduced in understated fashion by Jimmy Jam and Terry Lewis, the set revels in a creamy, sunlit variant on quiet-storm music. Studdard often seems to be picking up where the late Luther Vandross left off, but occasionally he veers into a Ray-Charles-gone-country vein. His lilting, seemingly effortless vocals are consistently a treat on balmy originals like 'More Than Words' and the big showpiece, 'We Got Love (That's Enough),' plus familiars like 'The Long and Winding Road' and the meanders-down-the-country-lane 'My Love Is a Rock' and 'For the Good Times.'"

== Commercial performance ==
Love Is debuted and peaked at number 36 in the US Billboard 200, with 15,000 copies sold in its first week of release. By June 2009, the album had sold 20,000 units in the US.

== Track listing ==
Love Is track listing
No.	Title	Writer(s)	Producer(s)	Length
1.	"Together"	Mikkel S. Eriksen; Tor Erik Hermansen; Phillip Taj Jackson; Martin Kleveland	Stargate; Martin K	4:26
2.	"More Than Words"	Gary Cherone; Nuno Bettencourt	Jimmy Jam & Terry Lewis; John Rich	4:24
3.	"Song for Her"	Ruben Studdard; James Harris III; Terry Lewis; John Jackson	Jimmy Jam & Terry Lewis; J. Jackson^{[a]}	3:49
4.	"How You Make Me Feel"	Eriksen; Hermansen; P. Jackson; Kleveland	Stargate; Martin	3:51
5.	"Don't Make 'Em Like U No More"	Getayveus Ealey; Reginald Perry	Syience	3:18
6.	"I Can't Help It"	Stevie Wonder; Susaye Greene	Jimmy Jam & Terry Lewis	4:06
7.	"Just Because"	Larry Addison	J. Jackson	4:11
8.	"My Love Is a Rock"	Studdard; Bob DiPiero; Tom Shapiro	J. Jackson	3:47
9.	"The Long and Winding Road"	John Lennon; Paul McCartney	Jimmy Jam & Terry Lewis; Nat Adderley, Jr.	3:41
10.	"For the Good Times"	Kris Kristofferson	Jimmy Jam & Terry Lewis; J. Jackson^{[a]}	4:50
11.	"We Got Love (That's Enough)"	Studdard; Barry Dean; Bill Luther	J. Jackson	3:21
12.	"Footprints in the Sand"	Studdard; Lars Halvor Jensen; PJ Morton; Warryn Campbell	Campbell	3:57

Amazon bonus track
No.	Title	Length
13.	"Wet Pillow"	3:56

Apple Music bonus tracks
No.	Title	Length
13.	"Love's in the Balance"	3:11
14.	"Celebrate Me Home"	3:46
15.	"Happy Feelin's"	6:09

Target bonus tracks
No.	Title	Length
13.	"Someday We'll All Be Free"
14.	"It's Your Love"

Wal-Mart bonus tracks
No.	Title	Length
13.	"Heaven"
14.	"One Day I'll Fly Away"

Notes

- ^{^[a]} signifies a co-producer

== Charts ==
Weekly chart performance for Love Is
Chart (2009)	Peak position
US Billboard 200	36
US Independent Albums (Billboard)	5
US Top R&B/Hip-Hop Albums (Billboard)	8
