= Deitrick Haddon =

American singer and songwriter

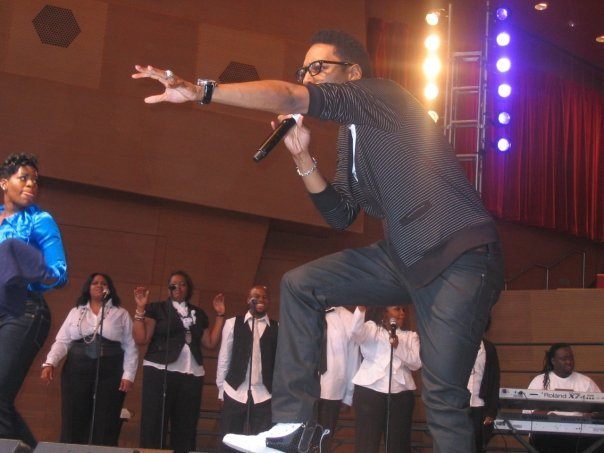
- Haddon in 2008

Background information
- Born: Deitrick Vaughn Haddon; May 17, 1973 (age 53)
- Origin: Detroit, Michigan, U.S.
- Genres: Gospel; urban gospel; pop; soul
- Occupations: Singer; songwriter; pianist; arranger; record producer; pastor
- Instruments: Vocals; piano
- Years active: 1995–present
- Labels: Tyscot; Arista; Verity; RCA Inspiration

Deitrick Vaughn Haddon (born May 17, 1973) is an American gospel singer, songwriter, pianist, arranger, record producer, and pastor. He is best known for performing progressive gospel and contemporary styles of music. He was one of the cast members in Oxygen's reality television show Preachers of L.A.

== Early career ==
Haddon launched his solo career as a Christian R&B vocalist with the Lost & Found on Tyscot/Verity in 2002. The album peaked at No. 1 on Billboard's Top Gospel Charts receiving wide acclaim; the hit "Sinner's Prayer" was played extensively on gospel and mainstream R&B radio stations.

Crossroads followed in 2004, led by the upbeat single "God is Good". In an uncharacteristic move for marketing a gospel album, Haddon made an appearance on the long-running syndicated series Soul Train; he performed the single and the title track from the album on the program. He appeared to be expanding into mainstream venues with 7 Days, released on October 10, 2006. 7 Days was almost entirely produced by R&B producers Tim & Bob The bulk of the album is contemporary; the albums has a traditional gospel-flavored lead single "Heaven Knows" which Haddon produced himself. Deitrick and his brother Gerald produced a comeback album, Brand New Day, for Vanessa Bell Armstrong, a veteran gospel singer. Deitrick Haddon & Voices of Unity's Live the Life won Gospel Music Workshop of America Excellence Awards for "New Artist of the Year—Urban Contemporary" and "Album of the Year—Urban Contemporary".

On September 2, 2008, Deitrick Haddon released an album called Revealed with the popular single, "Love Him Like I Do" (featuring Mary Mary and Ruben Studdard). On July 27, 2010, Haddon made his acting debut in a movie released directly to DVD called Blessed and Cursed. On January 25, 2012, he released Church on the Moon, his fifth album with Verity Records. The album debuted at No. 1 on the Billboard Top Gospel chart and No. 65 on the Billboard 200. He was part of the cast of the reality television show Preachers of L.A., which chronicles the lives of six Los Angeles preachers including Haddon. The show began airing on October 9, 2013 and was broadcast on the Oxygen network.

== Television ==
In the summer of 2019, Deitrick Haddon starred as Clarence Burnett in the movie Sins of the Father on TV One.

== Discography ==
=== Studio albums ===
List of albums, with selected chart positions, sales figures and certifications
| Title | Album details | Peak chart positions | | | | Sales |
| Title | Album details | US | US R&B | US Gospel | US Christian | Sales |
|---|---|---|---|---|---|---|
| Come into This House (with Voices of Unity) | Released: 1995; Label: Tyscot Records | — | — | — | — | |
| Live the Life (with Voices of Unity) | Released: March 25, 1997; Label: Tyscot | — | — | — | — | |
| This Is My Story (with Voices of Unity) | Released: May 12, 1998; Label: Platinum Entertainment | — | — | 31 | — | |
| Chain Breaker (with Voices of Unity) | Released: June 29, 1999; Label: Tyscot | — | — | 26 | — | |
| Super Natural (with Voices of Unity) | Released: July 24, 2001; Label: Tyscot | — | — | — | — | |
| Lost And Found | Released: August 6, 2002; Label: Verity Records | — | — | 5 | 18 | US: 259,262 (as of 2014) |
| All Star Edition (with Voices of Unity) | Released: June 8, 2004; Label: Tyscot | — | — | 37 | — | |
| Crossroads | Released: July 13, 2004; Label: Verity / Zomba | 178 | 36 | 1 | 8 | |
| 7 Days | Released: October 3, 2006; Label: Verity / Zomba | 135 | — | 4 | — | |
| Revealed | Released: September 2, 2008; Label: Tyscot | 98 | — | 2 | — | |
| Church on the Moon | Released: January 25, 2011; Label: Releve / Verity | 65 | — | 1 | — | |
| R.E.D. (Restoring Everything Damaged) | Released: September 3, 2013; Label: RCA | 71 | — | 1 | — | US: 35,266 (as of 2014) |
| Deitrick Haddon's LXW (League of Xtraordinary Worshippers) | Released: April 22, 2014; Label: Tyscot | 21 | — | 1 | — | |
| Masterpiece | Released: November 6, 2015; Label: ManHaddon Ministries | 57 | — | 1 | — | |
| Greatest Gift (with Zaytoven) | Released: December 14, 2018; Label: Familiar Territory / Motown | — | — | — | — | |
| Time: Truth Is My Energy | Released: March 13, 2020; Label: EOne | — | — | 4 | — | |
| A Deitrick Haddon Christmas | Released: November 24, 2022; Label: Deitrick Haddon | — | — | — | — | |
| One Night in California | Released: May 17, 2024; Label: Deitrick Haddon | — | — | — | — | |

=== Live albums ===
List of albums, with selected chart positions, sales figures and certifications
| Title | Album details | Peak chart positions |
| Title | Album details | US Gospel |
|---|---|---|
| Nu Hymns: Sing a Nu Song | Released: September 28, 1998; Label: Tyscot | — |
| Nu Hymnz II: Live from the Motor City | Released: February 13, 2001; Label: Tyscot | — |
| Together in Worship (with Voices of Unity) | Released: October 30, 2007; Label: Tyscot | 4 |

=== Compilation albums ===
List of albums, with selected chart positions
| Title | Album details | Peak chart positions |
| Title | Album details | US Gospel |
|---|---|---|
| Just The Hits | Released: 2005; Label: Tyscot | 38 |
| Anthology: The Writer & His Music | Released: 2011; Label: Tyscot | 7 |
| The Best of Deitrick Haddon | Released: September 2, 2014; Label: Tyscot | 6 |

=== Soundtrack albums ===
List of albums, with selected chart positions
| Title | Album details | Peak chart positions | |
| Title | Album details | US Indie | US Gospel |
|---|---|---|---|
| Blessed & Cursed (with Voices of Unity) | Released: 2010; Label: Tyscot | — | 12 |
| A Beautiful Soul (with Voices of Unity) | Released: 2012; Label: Tyscot | 46 | 10 |
| The Fallen Movie Soundtrack | Released: 2022; Label: DH Visions/ Entertainment | — | — |

=== Singles ===
List of charting singles, with selected chart positions and certifications, showing year released and album name
| Title | Year | Peak chart positions | | | Album |
| Title | Year | US Gospel | US R&B | US Adult R&B | Album |
|---|---|---|---|---|---|
| "God Is Good" | 2005 | 4 | — | — | Crossroads |
| "God Didn't Give Up" | 2005 | 5 | — | — | Crossroads |
| "Heaven Knows" | 2007 | 2 | — | — | 7 Days |
| "Watch Me Praise Him" (with Voices of Unity) | 2008 | 28 | — | — | Together in Worship |
| "He's Able" (with Voices of Unity) | 2008 | 24 | — | — | Together in Worship |
| "I'm Alive" | 2008 | 19 | — | — | Revealed |
| "Love Him Like I Do" (with Ruben Studdard and Mary Mary) | 2008 | 9 | — | — | Revealed |
| "Well Done" | 2010 | 4 | 100 | 36 | Church on the Moon |
| "Judah (Let Me Hear You Praise)" (with Voices of Unity) | 2010 | 24 | — | — | Blessed & Cursed |
| "No Betta" (feat. Faith Evans) | 2012 | 29 | — | — | A Beautiful Soul |
| "Have Your Way" | 2013 | 10 | — | — | R.E.D. (Restoring Everything Damaged) |
| "Keep Yo Mind" | 2013 | | — | — | R.E.D. (Restoring Everything Damaged) |
| "Great God" | 2014 | 12 | — | — | Deitrick Haddon's LXW (League of Xtraordinary Worshippers) |
| "My Soul Says Yes" | 2014 | | — | — | The Best of Deitrick Haddon |

== Personal life ==
On June 29, 1996, Haddon married Damita Chandler. Together they pastored for two and a half years the church which Deitrick's father founded, Kingdom Culture Church in West Side Detroit starting in 2009. They remained together for 15 years before a divorce in 2011. Haddon is now married to his second wife, Dominique Haddon (née McTyer). The couple have two daughters, Destin and Denver, and one son, Deitrick II. Haddon and his wife are now the Founders and Senior Pastors of Hill City Church in Los Angeles, where Haddon is founder/senior pastor and Dominique is executive pastor.
