= Revealed (Deitrick Haddon album) =

Studio album by Deitrick Haddon
- Released: September 2, 2008
- Recorded: 2007–2008
- Genre: Gospel
- Length: 64:04
- Label: Verity/Zomba
- Producer: Deitrick Haddon, Warryn Campbell, Tim & Bob, Dre & Vidal

Deitrick Haddon chronology
7 Days (2006)	Revealed (2008)	Church on the Moon (2011)

Revealed is the fourth studio album (and tenth overall) by American gospel singer-songwriter Deitrick Haddon. It was released on September 2, 2008, on Verity Records and Zomba Gospel.

Revealed reached number 98 on the Billboard 200 and number 2 on the Top Gospel Albums chart. Three singles were released in support of the album: "I'm Alive" (number 19, Top Gospel Songs), "Love Him Like I Do" featuring Ruben Studdard and Mary Mary (number 2, Top Gospel Songs) and "I Need Your Help".

Charity Stafford of AllMusic said that the album "makes plain [Haddon's] musical connection to modern pop music".

== Track listing ==
1. "Where You Are" (Vidal Davis / Deitrick Haddon / Andre Harris) (3:19)
2. "I'm Alive" (Eric Dawkins / Deitrick Haddon) (3:55)
3. "Go With Me" (Eric Dawkins / Deitrick Haddon) (3:19)
4. "It's Raining" (Deitrick Haddon) (3:40)
5. "Running to You" (Deitrick Haddon) (4:42)
6. "I Need Your Help" (Deitrick Haddon / Gerald Haddon) (4:51)
7. "Don't Take Your Spirit Away" (Damita Haddon / Deitrick Haddon) (3:54)
8. "Ungrateful" (David Haddon / Deitrick Haddon) (3:50)
9. "One Blood" (Vidal Davis / Deitrick Haddon / Andre Harris) (5:10)
10. "Reveal My Heart" (Tim Kelley, Bob Robinson, Deitrick Haddon) (4:28)
11. "Let Me Go" (Tim Kelley, Bob Robinson, Deitrick Haddon) (4:43)
12. "Soul Survivor" (Vidal Davis / Deitrick Haddon / Andre Harris) (4:59)
13. "Jesus For President" (Deitrick Haddon) (4:37)
14. "Love Him Like I Do" (Featuring Ruben Studdard & Mary Mary) (Erica Campbell / Warryn Campbell / Lamar Edwards / Deitrick Haddon) (3:18)
15. "The Word" (Deitrick Haddon / Alvin Williams) (5:27)
