= Letters from Birmingham =

Studio album by Ruben Studdard
- Released: March 13, 2012
- Genre: R&B
- Length: 45:44
- Label: Shanachie
- Producers: BlacElvis; Patrick "Guitar Boy" Hayes; Harold Lilly; Doramus Roberts

Ruben Studdard chronology
Playlist: The Very Best of Ruben Studdard (2010)	Letters from Birmingham (2012)	Unconditional Love (2014)

Singles from Letters from Birmingham
- 1. "June 28th (I'm Single)" Released: January 24, 2012

Letters from Birmingham is the fifth studio album by American singer Ruben Studdard. It was released by Shanachie Records on March 13, 2012 in the United States. His debut with the label, Studdard worked with Elvis "BlacElvis" Williams, and Harold Lilly on most of the project. The album takes its title from Letter from Birmingham Jail, an open letter in response to "A Call for Unity" during the Birmingham campaign, penned on April 16, 1963 by Martin Luther King Jr. after he had been arrested in Alabama.

== Critical reception ==
Professional ratings
Review scores
Source	Rating
About.com	3.5/5 stars
AllMusic	2.5/5 stars
Entertainment Weekly	B+

Mark Edward Nero from About.com called Letters from Birmingham the "most well-rounded and personal project of his career." He found that "the combination of being freed from the image management of American Idol and the creative freedom allowed by one of the best independent music labels around, Shanachie Entertainment, has given Ruben the boost he needed to revive his career and remain a relevant and successful artist." SoulTracks critic Melody Charles felt that the album "does offer illuminating glimpses into the life-and-death cycle of a relationship (more likely factual than fiction).

AllMusic editor Andy Kellman noted that "Four brief "letter" interludes help guide the listener through the stages in the singer's relationship; without them, the album would still have a discernible linear flow. The stylistic transitions, however, are not as smooth. There's some Southern-friend funk, neo-Philly soul, alternately silky and churning adult contemporary R&B [...] There is almost enough shifting to fill a season's worth of American Idol performances, and it detracts from the fact that this clearly is Studdard's most personal set of songs to date."

Billboard found that "reminiscent of Marvin Gaye's musical forays on Let's Get It On, Studdard sends listeners everything from smooth soul and funky/jazzy dancefloor grooves to movie-theme pop and gospel. That's a tall order. But he delivers, shifting seamlessly from raw funkster to angelic falsetto and back to contemporary crooner [...] The 2003 American Idol champ still has the chops." Allison Stewart described Letters from Birmingham as "an awkwardly executed concept album about relationships told, at least theoretically, through a series of romantic letters."

== Commercial performance ==
Letters from Birmingham debuted and peaked at number 73 on US Billboard 200.

== Track listing ==
Letters from Birmingham track listing
No.	Title	Writer(s)	Producer(s)	Length
1.	"Letter #1"			0:35
2.	"Turn You Out"	Ruben Studdard; Elvis Williams; Joseph Eugene Williams; Patrick "Guitar Boy" Hayes; Siraaj "Encore" Aziz*	BlacElvis	2:58
3.	"Love Skies"	E. Williams; Harold Lilly; Hayes	BlacElvis; Lilly; Hayes	4:39
4.	"Wear Me"	E. Williams; Lilly; Joseph Eugene Williams	BlacElvis; Lilly	4:00
5.	"Letter #2"			0:37
6.	"Pure Imagination"	Anthony Newley; Leslie Bricusse	BlacElvis; Lilly	2:50
7.	"Do It Right" (featuring Chrisette Michele)	E. Williams; Lilly; Taryn Kaufman	BlacElvis; Lilly	3:31
8.	"Today (Hallelujah!)"	E. Williams; Lilly; Hayes	BlacElvis; Lilly; Hayes	3:15
9.	"Letter #3"			0:37
10.	"Twisted Love"	E. Williams; Lilly; Hayes; J. Williams	BlacElvis; Lilly	3:16
11.	"Rock Wit'cha" (featuring K. Michelle)	Daryl Simmons; Kenneth Edmonds	BlacElvis; Lilly	4:00
12.	"All About U"	Doramus Roberts; E. Williams	Roberts; BlacElvis	3:51
13.	"Letter #4"			0:34
14.	"Her 4 U"	E. Williams; Lilly; Hayes	BlacElvis; Lilly	4:03
15.	"What's the Reason"	E. Williams; Lilly; Hayes; J. Williams	BlacElvis; Lilly; Hayes	3:37
16.	"June 28th (I'm Single)"	Studdard; E. Williams; Lilly; Hayes	BlacElvis; Lilly	3:21

Best Buy bonus tracks
No.	Title	Length
17.	"Loving You Is Killing Me"
18.	"For Both of Us I'll Be Concerned"
19.	"What a Day"
20.	"Leading Lady"

== Charts ==
Weekly chart performance for Letters from Birmingham
Chart (2012)	Peak position
US Billboard 200	73
US Independent Albums (Billboard)	18
US Top R&B/Hip-Hop Albums (Billboard)	12
