= Bob Harper (personal trainer) =

American personal trainer, author, television personality

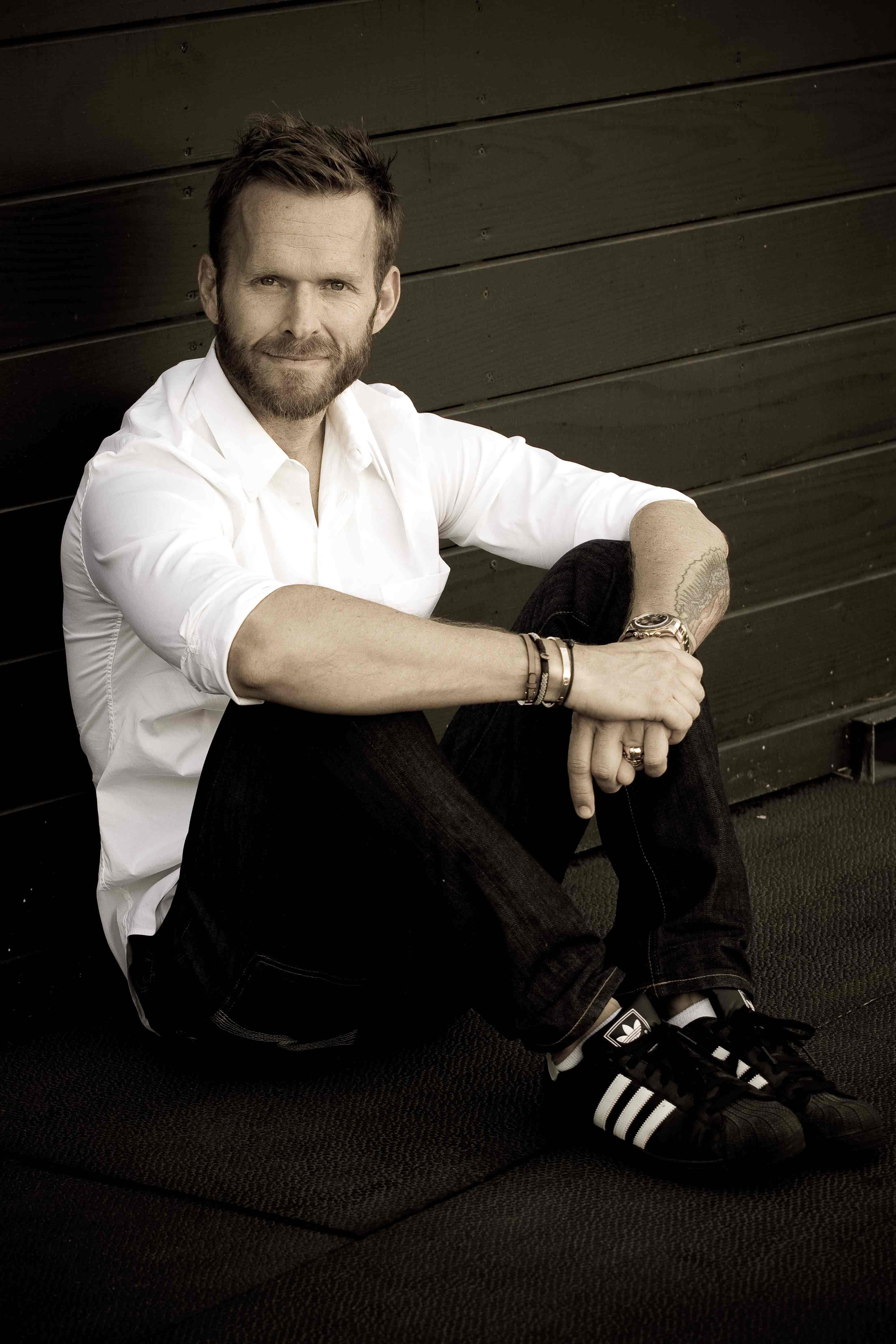
- Born: Robert Harper; August 18, 1965 (age 61); Nashville, Tennessee, U.S.
- Occupations: Personal trainer, author, reality television personality
- Height: 5 ft 11.5 in (181.6 cm)
- Website: mytrainerbob.com

Robert Harper (born August 18, 1965) is an American personal trainer, reality television personality, and writer. He appeared on the American television series The Biggest Loser, a show he later hosted. He was an advisor on The New Celebrity Apprentice and a contestant on Season 3 of the American version of The Traitors.

== Career ==
Harper has worked as a personal trainer for celebrity clients, including Jennifer Jason Leigh. In 1999, he was cast as an extra in Melissa Etheridge's hit video for the song "Angels Would Fall" from her album Breakdown. He is featured as a trainer on the American version of The Biggest Loser reality television series. He has been a trainer on the NBC show since 2004. and has appeared in several Biggest Loser DVD workouts. On September 8, 2015, Harper was announced as new host of The Biggest Loser, succeeding Alison Sweeney. Harper is also featured in the first three seasons of the Australian version of the show.

In addition to making appearances, speaking dates, and writing, Harper teaches regular classes in Los Angeles and works as a yoga instructor.

In early 2010, Harper launched mytrainerbob.com, a website where subscribers could discuss weight loss and receive coaching. The success of his site led to the release of his first workout DVD series in May, titled "Bob Harper: Inside Out Method." Harper has also contributed workouts to the Shape magazine website.

== Personal life ==
Harper was born in Nashville. He attended Austin Peay State University in Clarksville, Tennessee; however, he did not graduate.

After reading the book Skinny Bitch, Harper became a vegetarian. In 2010, he then became a vegan. In 2013, Harper stopped following a vegan diet because "my body personally got to a point where I needed something more." He practices Transcendental Meditation. He is an avid CrossFit athlete.

Harper has spoken out against puppy mills and has adopted a black and white dog from the Animal Advocates Alliance in Baldwin Park, California. He named the dog Karl, after Karl Lagerfeld, because of the dog's color.

Harper is Farm Sanctuary's 2010 Walk for Farm Animals national spokesman.

Harper publicly came out as gay in the seventh episode of the fifteenth season of The Biggest Loser, while talking to a contestant who was having difficulty telling his parents about his sexuality. Harper revealed he had come out to his parents at 17, but that this was his first time ever addressing his sexuality publicly in his career. The episode aired on November 28, 2013.

On February 12, 2017, Harper suffered a heart attack; his survival story later became a subject for a Brilinta commercial.

== Bibliography ==
- Harper, Bob (2008). Are You Ready!: Take Charge, Lose Weight, Get in Shape, and Change. Harmony Books. ISBN 978-0-767-92872-4.
- Harper, Bob; Greg Critser (2012). The Skinny Rules: The Simple, Nonnegotiable Principles for Getting to Thin. Ballantine Books. ISBN 978-0-345-53312-8.
- Harper, Bob; Greg Critser (2013). Jumpstart to Skinny: The Simple 3-Week Plan for Supercharged Weight Loss. Ballantine Books. ISBN 978-0-345-54510-7.
- Harper, Bob (2014). Skinny Meals: Everything You Need to Lose Weight-Fast!. Ballantine Books. ISBN 978-0-804-17889-1.
- Harper, Bob (2017). The Super Carb Diet. St. Martin's Press. ISBN 978-1-250-14660-1.
