= I Need an Angel (album) =

Studio album by Ruben Studdard
- Released: November 23, 2004
- Genre: Gospel
- Length: 49:26
- Label: J; 19
- Producer: Warryn Campbell; Eric Dawkins; Alvin "Cornbread" Garrett; Fred Hammond; R. Kelly; Ruben Studdard; Lauren Thomas; Harvey Watkins, Jr.

Ruben Studdard chronology
Soulful (2003)	I Need an Angel (2004)	The Return (2006)

I Need an Angel is the second studio album by American singer Ruben Studdard. It was released on November 23, 2004 by J Records.

== Crtitical reception ==
Professional ratings
Review scores
Source	Rating
AllMusic	3/5 stars
People	3/4 stars

AllMusic editor Stephen Thomas Erlewine found that "while there are a number of cooks in the kitchen [...] I Need an Angel, winds up being cohesive since it's all coming from the same perspective. It's all easy-rolling, smooth, and polished slow grooves, sometimes easing by on the sound of the record, other times gelling quite nicely thanks to some sturdily written and arranged songs [...] So, while it has no standout cuts, on the whole I Need an Angel winds up being a bit more solid than his proper debut. People noted that "on this gospel excursion, the cuddly singer takes it back to church, and whereas he never seemed quite comfortable in his role as R&B; love man on last year's debut, Soulful, he seems totally in his element here. Studdard is clearly inspired to perform songs he grew up on."

== Commercial performance ==
The album debuted and peaked at number 20 on the US Billboard 200 albums chart, with first week sales of 96,000 units. It also topped both the Top R&B/Hip-Hop Albums and the Top Gospel Albums chart. On April 8, 2005, it was certified gold by the Recording Industry Association of America (RIAA).

== Track listing ==
I Need an Angel track listing
No.	Title	Writer(s)	Producer(s)	Length
1.	"I Need an Angel"	R. Kelly	Kelly	4:51
2.	"Center of My Joy"	Richard Smallwood; Bill Gaither; Gloria Gaither	Warryn "Baby Dubb" Campbell	5:52
3.	"Goin' Up Yonder"	Walter Hawkins	Campbell	3:40
4.	"Fix It, Jesus" (featuring Harvey Watkins, Jr.)	Watkins	Watkins	3:46
5.	"Amazing Grace"	John Newton	Eric Dawkins	4:31
6.	"Shout to the Lord"	Darlene Zschech	Dawkins	3:59
7.	"Running Back to You"	Hammond	Hammond	5:08
8.	"Restoration"	Mario Winans	Winans	3:59
9.	"We Have Not Forgotten" (featuring Fred Hammond)	Hammond; Noel Hall		4:39
10.	"I Surrender All"	Eugene Clark, Judson Van DeVenter	Dawkins; Derek Clark^{[a]}	3:58
11.	"Ain't No Need to Worry" (featuring Mary Mary)	Winans	Campbell	3:01
12.	"Don't You Give Up"	Ruben Studdard; Alvin "Cornbread" Garrett; Alphonzo Mizell; Berry Gordy, Jr.; Deke Richards; Freddie Perren	Studdard; Garrett; Lauren Thomas	3:46

Notes

- ^{^[a]} signifies a co-producer

Sample credits

- "Don't You Give Up" contains a sample from "Maybe Tomorrow" as performed by The Jackson 5.

== Charts ==
=== Weekly charts ===
Weekly chart performance for I Need an Angel
Chart (2004)	Peak position
US Billboard 200	20
US Top Gospel Albums (Billboard)	1
US Top R&B/Hip-Hop Albums (Billboard)	1

=== Year-end charts ===
Year-end chart performance for I Need an Angel
Chart (2005)	Position
US Billboard 200	172
US Top R&B/Hip-Hop Albums (Billboard)	49

== Certifications ==
Certifications and sales for I Need an Angel
Region	Certification	Certified units/sales
United States (RIAA)	Gold	500,000^{^}
^{^} Shipments figures based on certification alone.
