= Soulful (Ruben Studdard album) =

Studio album by Ruben Studdard
- Released: December 9, 2003
- Recorded: 2003
- Genre: R&B; hip hop
- Length: 55:28
- Label: J; 19
- Producer: Melvin "St. Nick" Coleman; Dre & Vidal; Babyface; Irv Gotti & Jimi Kendrix; Fred Hammond; Kevin Hicks; Jazze Pha; Harold Lilly; James McMillan; Carl Sturken and Evan Rogers; Lil' Ronnie; Swizz Beatz; Gerard Thomas; The Underdogs

Ruben Studdard chronology
| Soulful (2003) | I Need an Angel (2004) |

Singles from Soulful
- 1. "Sorry 2004" Released: December 12, 2003; 2. "What If" Released: 2004

Soulful is the debut studio album from second-season American Idol winner Ruben Studdard, released on December 9, 2003 by J Records. The record received mixed reviews from critics divided over the quality of the track listing and Ruben's vocal performance. Soulful debuted at number one on the Billboard 200 and spawned two singles: "Sorry 2004" and "What If".

== Critical reception ==
Professional ratings
Review scores
| Source | Rating |
|---|---|
| AllMusic | 3.5/5 stars |
| Entertainment Weekly | C |
| Mojo | 3/5 stars |
| People | 2.5/4 stars |
| Rolling Stone | 1/5 stars |
| Slant Magazine | 2/5 stars |
| USA Today | 2.5/4 stars |
| Variety | (negative) |

Soulful garnered mixed reviews from music critics divided over the track listing and Studdard's vocal performance. A writer for People said that Soulful does "a good job of translating to record the cuddly Velvet Teddy Bear charm that won over Idol fans, resulting in a likable if unspectacular set." David Browne, writing for Entertainment Weekly, commended the "penthouse R&B and mild hip-hop" tracks by Swizz Beatz and Irv Gotti for providing versatility in Studdard's performance but found his vocals on the ballads to be "raw and unpolished," filled with mediocrity whenever he "either strains or sings flat." The A.V. Club's Keith Phipps said that the show favorite ballads were the highlights compared to more uptempo tracks like "No Ruben" and "What Is Sexy", concluding that following in this direction shows that "even the most obviously talented contestant to walk the Idol stage seems fated to be forever a glorified karaoke champ." Sal Cinquemani of Slant Magazine also found the ballads Studdard performed on the show showcase his strengths more than tracks like "Don't Quit On Me" and "Take the Shot" that are "insufferably repetitive and tuneless", calling the overall record "a painfully predictable mix of traditional R&B glop and comparatively forced contemporary hip-hop." Barry Walters from Rolling Stone heavily criticized the songwriters and producers for crafting material that sounds like "Broadway ripoffs of hip-hop-inspired R&B", concluding that "Studdard does the best he can, but the people behind him and the other Idols simply aren't trying."

== Commercial performance ==
The album debuted at number one on the Billboard 200, selling over 417,000 copies in its first week, the highest first week sales by debut male R&B act and was certified Platinum by the RIAA in January 2004. In the U.S. the album sold an estimated 1,779,000 copies.

== Track listing ==
Soulful track listing
| No. | Title | Writer(s) | Producer(s) | Length |
|---|---|---|---|---|
| 1. | "Sorry 2004" | Harvey Mason Jr.; Damon Thomas; Ronnie Jackson; Tony Dixon; Eric Dawkins | The Underdogs | 4:22 |
| 2. | "No Ruben" | Harold Lilly; Melvin Coleman; Will Jennings; Joe Sample | Lilly; Coleman | 4:02 |
| 3. | "How Can You Mend a Broken Heart" | Barry Gibb; Robin Gibb | Carl Sturken; Evan Rogers | 4:23 |
| 4. | "Take the Shot" | Kasseem Dean; Lilly | Swizz Beatz; Lilly^{[a]} | 4:23 |
| 5. | "What Is Sexy" (featuring Fat Joe) | Irving Lorenzo; Jeffrey Atkins; Nathaniel Robinson; Kirk Robinson; Mark Morales; Mark Rooney | Irv Gotti | 3:40 |
| 6. | "What If" | Mason; Dixon; Lofton; Dawkins; Jason Edmonds | The Underdogs | 3:50 |
| 7. | "Superstar" | Bonnie Bramlett; Leon Russell | James McMillan | 4:13 |
| 8. | "Can I Get Your Attention" (featuring Pretty Tony) | Lilly; Gerald Thomas | Lilly; Thomas | 3:37 |
| 9. | "For All We Know" | Sam Lewis; J. Fred Coots | Sturken; Rogers | 3:41 |
| 10. | "Play Our Song" | Phalon Alexander; Johntá Austin; Kevin Hicks; Keri Hilson | Jazze Pha | 4:07 |
| 11. | "Don't Quit on Me" | Dean; Lilly | Swizz Beatz | 3:18 |
| 12. | "After the Candles Burn" | Andre Harris; Vidal Davis; Jason Boyd; Ryan Toby | Dre & Vidal | 3:31 |

Bonus track(s)
| No. | Title | Writer(s) | Producer(s) | Length |
|---|---|---|---|---|
| 13. | "Flying Without Wings" | Steve Mac; Wayne Hector | The Underdogs | 3:44 |
| 14. | "We Have Not Forgotten" (featuring Fred Hammond) | Hammond; Noel Hall | Hammond | 4:39 |

Notes

- ^{^[a]} signifies a vocal producer

Sample credits

- "No Ruben" contains a sample of the recording "Hold On (I Feel Our Love Is Changing)" by B.B. King & The Crusaders.
- "What is Sexy" contains interpolations from "Real Love," written by Nathaniel Robinson Jr, Kirk Robinson, Mark Morales, and Cory Rooney.
- "Can I Get Your Attention" contains a sample of the recording "It's Over" by Cameo.

== Personnel ==
Adapted from AllMusic.

- Kamel Abdo – engineer
- Kwaku Alston – photography
- June Ambrose – stylist
- Maxi Anderson – background vocals
- David Ashton – Pro Tools, vocal engineer
- Elena Barere – concert master, violin
- Davis A. Barnett – viola
- Bob Becker – viola
- Eric Bell – background vocals
- Cecilia Bereal-Powell – background vocals
- Joseph Jr. Bereal – background vocals
- Latanya Bereal – vocal contractor, background vocals
- Melissa Bereal – background vocals
- Charlie Bisharat – violin
- Jim Bottari – engineer, string engineer
- Paul Boutin – engineer
- Joel Bowers – background vocals
- Felecia Bowles – choir/chorus, group member
- Leslie Brathwaite – mixing
- Chandler Bridges – Pro Tools
- Jacqueline Bridges – choir/chorus, group member
- Jamie Brown – choir/chorus, group member
- David Campbell – arranger, string arrangements
- Terrence Cash – assistant engineer
- Rob Chiarelli – mixing
- Steve Churchyard – engineer
- Tanisha J. Cidel – choir/chorus, group member
- Melvin Coleman – producer
- Steve Conover – engineer
- Larry Corbett – cello
- Cenovia Cummins – violin
- Ashley Davis – background vocals
- Clive Davis – producer
- Kevin KD Davis – mixing
- Mike Davis – assistant
- Vidal Davis – instrumentation, mixing, producer
- Eric Dawkins – vocal director, background vocals
- Andrea Derby – production coordination
- Joel Derouin – concert master
- Vincent Dilorenzo – engineer
- Jonathan Dinklage – violin
- PamKenyon Donald – production manager
- Crystal Drummer – background vocals
- Nathan East – bass
- Fat Joe – featured artist, guest artist, primary artist
- Lawrence Feldman – flute
- Steve Ferrera – drums
- Barry Finclair – violin
- Angela Fisher – background vocals
- Steve Fisher – assistant
- Ghislaine Fleischmann – violin
- Bruce Fraser – engineer
- John Frye – mixing
- Simon Fuller – management
- Armen Garabedian – violin
- Berj Garabedian – violin
- Chris Gehringer – mastering
- Serban Ghenea – mixing
- Larry Gold – conductor, string arrangements
- Peter Gordon – French horn
- Gordon Goss – assistant engineer
- Irv Gotti – producer
- Hart Gunther – assistant engineer
- Noel Hall – keyboards
- Fred Hammond – drum programming, featured artist, guest artist, mixing, primary artist, vocals, background vocals
- Ray Hammond – mixing engineer
- Kevin Hanson – guitar
- Andre Harris – instrumentation, mixing, producer
- Dabling Harward – editing, engineer
- Al Hemberger – engineer, mixing
- Dino Hermann – Pro Tools
- Kevin Hicks – producer
- Larry Jackson – A&R
- Mark Jaimes – guitar
- Jazze Pha – producer
- Suzie Katayama – cello
- Rich Keller – mixing
- Andrew Kennedy – background vocals
- Eric King – background vocals
- Olga Konopelsky – violin
- Emma Kummrow – violin
- Charlene Kwas – violin
- Edward Lawson – background vocals
- Ricky Lawson – drums
- Chris LeBeau – artwork
- Lil Ronnie – instrumentation, producer
- Harold Lilly – producer, vocal producer, background vocals
- Vince Lionti – viola
- Richard Locker – cello
- Jennie Lorenzo – cello
- Kev Mahoney – assistant engineer
- Harvey Mason Jr. – group member, producer
- John McGlinchey – assistant
- James McMillan – arranger, producer
- Kevin Milburn – background vocals
- David Earl Miller – choir/chorus, group member
- Cindy Mizelle – guest artist, background vocals
- Rob Mounsey – conductor, guest artist, keyboards, piano, string arrangements
- Peter Murray – keyboards, piano
- Peter Nocella – viola
- Sid Page – violin
- Alyssa Park – violin
- Bob Peterson – violin
- Greg Phillinganes – keyboards
- Malcolm Pollack – engineer
- Postmaster – programming
- James Poyser – piano
- Karie Prescott – viola
- Pretty Tony – featured artist, guest artist, primary artist
- Alex Reverberi – engineer
- Michele Richards – violin
- Tim Roberts – assistant
- Mark Robertson – violin
- Evan Rogers – producer
- Jonn Savannah – Pro Tools
- Jon Smeltz – mixing
- Dan Smith – cello
- Richard Sortomme – violin
- Brian Springer – engineer
- Ruben Studdard – primary artist, vocals, background vocals
- Carl Sturken – guitar, keyboards, producer
- Swizz Beatz – producer
- Igor Szwec – violin
- Damon Thomas – group member, producer
- Gerard Thomas – producer
- Michael Thompson – guitar
- Tribe Called Judah – choir/chorus, group
- The Underdogs – group, instrumentation, producer
- Josefina Vergara – violin
- Alonzo Vargas – assistant engineer
- Tommie Walker – drum programming
- Doc Wiley – engineer
- Anthony Wilkins – background vocals
- Evan Wilson – viola
- Kevin Wilson – assistant engineer, engineer
- Mike "Hitman" Wilson – engineer
- John Wittenberg – violin
- Joey Woolfalk – guitar
- A.J. Wright – choir/chorus
- Gavyn Wright – orchestra leader
- Alexis Yraola – art direction, design
- Helen Zeigler – choir/chorus, group member

== Charts ==
=== Weekly charts ===
Weekly chart performance for Soulful
| Chart (2003–04) | Peak position |
|---|---|
| US Billboard 200 | 1 |
| US Top R&B/Hip-Hop Albums (Billboard) | 1 |

=== Year-end charts ===
Year-end chart performance for Soulful
| Chart (2004) | Position |
|---|---|
| US Billboard 200 | 31 |
| US Top R&B/Hip-Hop Albums (Billboard) | 7 |

== Certifications ==
Certifications and sales for Soulful
| Region | Certification | Certified units/sales |
|---|---|---|
| United States (RIAA) | Platinum | 1,000,000^{^} |
^{^} Shipments figures based on certification alone.

== See also ==
- List of Billboard 200 number-one albums of 2003
- List of Billboard number-one R&B albums of 2004
