= Make Ya Feel Beautiful =

Single by Ruben Studdard

from the album The Return
- Released: April 28, 2007
- Recorded: 2006
- Genre: R&B
- Length: 3:27
- Label: J Records
- Songwriter(s): Ne-Yo, Shea Taylor,
- Producer(s): Shea Taylor

Ruben Studdard singles chronology
"Change Me" (2006)	"Make Ya Feel Beautiful" (2007)	"Love Him Like I Do" (2008)

"Make Ya Feel Beautiful" is the second single from Ruben Studdard's third album The Return. It has reached a peak of number 32 on Billboard's Hot R&B/Hip Hop Singles chart. In addition, the single has reached a peak at number six on the Hot Adult R&B Airplay chart.

== Charts ==
=== Weekly charts ===
Chart (2007)	Peak position
US Adult R&B Songs (Billboard)	6
US Hot R&B/Hip-Hop Songs (Billboard)	32

=== Year-end charts ===
Chart (2007)	Position
US Hot R&B/Hip-Hop Songs (Billboard)	85
