= The Biggest Loser season 15 =

The Biggest Loser
- Season 15
- No. of episodes: 15

Release
- Original network: NBC
- Original release: October 15, 2013 – February 4, 2014

Season chronology
- ← Previous; Season 14 (Challenge America) Next → Season 16 (Glory Days)

The Biggest Loser: Second Chances 2 is the fifteenth season of the NBC reality television series entitled The Biggest Loser. The contestants competed to win the $250,000 prize, which was awarded to Rachel Frederickson, the contestant with the highest percentage of weight lost. It premiered on October 15, 2013. This was the first season to introduce a trainer save, in which each trainer could choose to save one contestant on their team from being sent home as a result falling below the red line.

The season was won by Rachel Frederickson, weighing in at only 105 pounds. Mass-media had raised concern, wondering if that was a healthy weight loss. In the same month after the finale, Fredrickson regained 20 pounds to reach her 'perfect weight', putting her at 125 pounds.

== Contestants ==
Name	Team	Singles	Status	Total votes
Fernanda Abarca, 32, Montrose, CA	White Team	—N/a	Eliminated Week 2	^{[R]}
Craig Arrington, 30, Wilson, NC	White Team	—N/a	Saved Week 1 Eliminated Week 5	^{[R]}
Holley Mangold, 24, Columbus, OH	Blue Team	—N/a	Eliminated Week 7	^{[R]}
Ruben Studdard, 35, Birmingham, AL	Red Team	—N/a	Eliminated Week 4 Returned Week 6 Re-Eliminated Week 8	^{[R]}
Matt Hooper, 38, Georgetown, MA	Blue Team	Blue	Saved Week 6 Eliminated Week 10	^{[R]}
† Hap Holmstead, 26, Pleasant Grove, UT	Blue Team	Yellow	Eliminated Week 10	^{[R]}
Tumi Oguntala, 41, Clifton Park, NY	White Team	Maroon	Eliminated Week 11	4
Jay Sheets, 38, Farmington, MO	White Team	Brown	Eliminated Week 12	4
Marie Pearl, 30, Springfield, MO	White Team	Orange	Eliminated Week 13	^{[R]}
Tanya Winfield, 40, Plainfield, IL	Red Team	Red	Saved Week 3 Eliminated Week 13	^{[R]}
Jennifer Messer, 42, Abingdon, VA	Red Team	Purple	Eliminated Week 14	^{[R]}
Chelsea Arthurs, 28, Raleigh, NC	Blue Team	Pink	Eliminated Week 14	^{[R]}
Bobby Saleem, 28, Chicago, IL	Blue Team	Aqua	Eliminated Week 9 Returned Week 11; 2nd Runner-Up	1
David Brown, 43, Edmond, OK	Red Team	Grey	Runner-Up	
Rachel Frederickson, 24, Los Angeles, CA	Red Team	Green	Biggest Loser	

The "Total Votes" column indicates the number of votes cast against the contestant when he/she was eliminated.
^[Q] This contestant quit the competition.
^[R] This contestant fell below the Red Line, and was eliminated without any votes.
^[E1] This contestant lost a weigh-in and was eliminated without any votes, due to having the lower percentage of weight loss on a team with just two remaining contestants.

== Weigh-ins ==
Contestants are listed in reverse chronological order of elimination.

Contestant	Age	Height	Starting BMI	Ending BMI	Starting weight	Week													Semi- final	Finale	Weight lost	Percentage lost
Contestant	Age	Height	Starting BMI	Ending BMI	Starting weight	1	2	3	4	5	6	7	8	9	10	11	12	13	Semi- final	Finale	Weight lost	Percentage lost
Rachel	24	5'4"	44.6	18.0	260	239	231	224	216	198	195	183	178	171	167	161	155	151	150	105	155	59.62%*
David	43	6'2"	52.5	24.0	409	371	360	354	347	334	317	306	299	294	282	270	266	259	243	187	222	54.28%
Bobby	28	6'3"	44.7	21.2	358	338	328	321	317	298	293	284	272	269	261	254	256	248	231	170	188	52.51%
Chelsea	28	5'6"	38.9	23.6	241	229	223	220	215	202	197	191	185	181	177	171	168	164	157	146	95	39.42%
Jennifer	42	5'7"	41.7	25.4	266	255	246	242	236	224	220	211	207	200	195	189	189	185	182	162	104	39.10%
Tanya	40	5'7"	41.0	27.4	262	246	242	242	239	224	220	216	212	208	201	198	196	192		175	87	33.21%
Marie	30	5'6"	40.2	22.3	249	240	235	229	225	213	207	203	198	192	187	183	178	175		138	111	44.58%
Jay	38	5'10"	42.6	26.3	297	274	263	253	244	231	226	219	207	201	196	192	193			183	114	38.38%
Tumi	41	5'8"	48.5	21.9	319	305	297	287	280	267	256	250	243	234	225	221				144	175	54.86%*
Hap	26	6'5"	47.8	38.2	403	386	373	368	363	348	340	334	332	321	316					322	81	20.10%
Matt	38	6'3"	44.5	27.9	356	333	325	319	315	294	290	281	277	268	263					223	133	37.36%
Ruben	35	6'3"	57.7	42.9	462	441	431	428	423	409	401	394	392		377					343	119	25.76%
Holley	24	5'9"	51.8	37.7	351	335	325	319	315	296	291	288			277					255	96	27.35%
Craig	30	6'1"	50.8	29.4	385	372	361	357	350	336					307					223	162	42.08%
Fernanda	32	5'7"	39.2	25.5	250	238	236								208					163	87	34.80%

Notes

- Jillian used her save with Craig, in Week 1, Dolvett used his save with Tanya, in Week 3, and Bob used his save with Matt, in Week 6.
- During Week 4, Jillian gave some supplements to the White Team, without doctors' permission. So, in the following weigh-in, Alison revealed the last weigh-in had been invalid, and so the Blue Team would, once again, be immune, and Ruben, the contestant eliminated in Week 4, would be brought back. And also because of that fact, Jillian's team would receive a 4 pounds disadvantage (1 pound for each member of the team).
- Week 5 was a two-week weigh-in, resulting in exceptionally higher numbers for this weigh-in.
- Bobby's 3.13% weight loss in week 13 was counted as −2.36% due to his weight gain the previous week so David's valid −2.63% weight loss made him the biggest loser of the week.
- Rachel's 59.62% loss is the highest percentage lost in Biggest Loser history. Tumi's 54.86% weight loss is the highest percentage for an At-Home Winner.
- Rachel is the first person in Biggest Loser history (Worldwide) to be underweight at the finale.

Standings
Week's Biggest Loser (Team or Individuals)
Week's Biggest Loser and Immunity
Immunity (Challenge or Weigh-in)
Results from At-Home Players
Contestant Withdraws before Weigh-In
Contestant was Saved by the respective Trainer

Teams
Bob's Team
Jillian's Team
Dolvett's Team

BMI
Underweight (less than 18.5 BMI)
Normal (18.5 – 24.9 BMI)
Overweight (25 – 29.9 BMI)
Obese Class I (30 – 34.9 BMI)
Obese Class II (35 – 39.9 BMI)
Obese Class III (greater than 40 BMI)

Winners
$250,000 Winner (among the finalists)
$100,000 Winner (among the eliminated contestants)

=== Weigh-In Difference History ===
Contestant	Week														
Contestant	1	2	3	4	5	6	7	8	9	10	11	12	13	14	Finale
Rachel	−21	−8	−7	−8	−18	−3	−12	−5	−7	−4	−6	−6	−4	−1	−45
David	−38	−11	−6	−7	−13	−17	−11	−7	−5	−12	−12	−4	−7	−16	−56
Bobby	−20	−10	−7	−4	−19	−5	−9	−12	−3	-8	−7	+2	−8	−17	−61
Chelsea	−12	−6	−3	−5	−13	−5	−6	−6	−4	−4	−6	−3	−4	−7	-11
Jennifer	−11	−9	−4	−6	−12	−4	−9	−4	−7	−5	−6	0	−4	−3	-20
Tanya	−16	−4	0	−3	−15	−4	−4	−4	−4	−7	−3	−2	−4	-17	
Marie	−9	−5	−6	−4	−12	−6	−4	−5	−6	−5	−4	−5	−3	-37	
Jay	−23	−11	−10	−9	−13	−5	−7	−12	−6	−5	−4	+1	-10		
Tumi	−14	−8	−10	−7	−13	−11	−6	−7	−9	−9	−4	-77			
Hap	−17	−13	−5	−5	−15	−8	−6	−2	−11	−5	+6				
Matt	−23	−8	−6	−4	−21	−4	−9	−4	−9	−5	-40				
Ruben	−21	−10	−3	−5	-14	−8	−7	−2	-15		-34				
Holley	−16	−10	−6	−4	−19	−5	−3	-11			-22				
Craig	−13	−11	−4	−7	−14	-29					-84				
Fernanda	−12	−2	-28								-45				

Notes

- Rachel's 4 pound weight loss in week 10 was displayed as −5 due to her 1-pound advantage from the challenge.
- Tanya's 3 pound weight loss in week 11 was displayed as −2 due to her 1-pound disadvantage from the challenge.
- Rachel's 6 pound weight loss in week 12 was displayed as −7 due to her 1-pound advantage from the challenge.
- Bobby's 8 pound weight loss in week 13 was displayed as −6 due to the weight he gained last week.

=== Weigh-In Percentage History ===
Contestant	Week														
Contestant	1	2	3	4	5	6	7	8	9	10	11	12	13	14	Finale
Rachel	−8.08%	−3.35%	−3.03%	−3.57%	−8.33%	−1.52%	−6.15%	−2.73%	−3.93%	−2.34%	−3.59%	−3.73%	−2.58%	−0.66%	−30.00%
David	−9.29%	−2.96%	−1.67%	−1.98%	−3.75%	−5.08%	−3.47%	−2.28%	−1.67%	−4.08%	−4.26%	−1.48%	−2.63%	−6.18%	−23.05%
Bobby	−5.59%	−2.96%	−2.13%	−1.25%	−5.99%	−1.67%	−3.07%	−4.23%	−1.10%	-2.97%	−2.68%	+0.79%	−3.13%	−6.85%	−26.41%
Chelsea	−4.98%	−2.62%	−1.35%	−2.27%	−6.05%	−2.47%	−3.05%	−3.14%	−2.16%	−2.21%	−3.39%	−1.75%	−2.38%	−4.27%	-5.73%
Jennifer	−4.14%	−3.53%	−1.63%	−2.48%	−5.08%	−1.78%	−4.09%	−1.90%	−3.38%	−2.50%	−3.08%	0.00%	−2.12%	−1.62%	-10.99%
Tanya	−6.11%	−1.63%	0.00%	−1.24%	−6.28%	−1.78%	−1.82%	−1.85%	−1.87%	−3.37%	−1.49%	−1.01%	−2.04%	-8.85%	
Marie	−3.61%	−2.08%	−2.55%	−1.75%	−5.33%	−2.81%	−1.93%	−2.46%	−3.03%	−2.60%	−2.14%	−2.73%	−1.69%	-21.14%	
Jay	−7.74%	−4.01%	−3.80%	−3.56%	−5.33%	−2.16%	−3.10%	−5.48%	−2.90%	−2.49%	−2.04%	+0.52%	-5.18%		
Tumi	−4.39%	−2.62%	−3.37%	−2.44%	−4.64%	−4.12%	−2.34%	−2.80%	−3.70%	−3.85%	−1.78%	-34.84%			
Hap	−4.22%	−3.37%	−1.34%	−1.36%	−4.13%	−2.29%	−1.76%	−0.60%	−3.31%	−1.56%	+1.90%				
Matt	−6.46%	−2.40%	−1.85%	−1.25%	−6.67%	−1.36%	−3.10%	−1.42%	−3.25%	−1.87%	-15.21%				
Ruben	−4.55%	−2.27%	−0.70%	−1.17%	-3.31%	−1.95%	−1.75%	−0.51%	-3.83%		-9.02%				
Holley	−4.56%	−2.99%	−1.85%	−1.25%	−6.03%	−1.68%	−1.03%	-3.82%			-7.94%				
Craig	−3.38%	−2.96%	−1.11%	−1.96%	−4.00%	-9.23%					-27.36%				
Fernanda	−4.80%	−0.84%	-11.86%								-21.63%				

Notes

- Rachel's 2.34% weight loss in week 10 was counted as 2.92% due to her 1-pound advantage from the challenge.
- Tanya's 1.49% weight loss in week 11 was counted as 1.00% due to her 1-pound disadvantage from the challenge.
- Rachel's 3.73% weight loss in week 12 was counted as 4.35% due to her 1-pound advantage from the challenge.
- Bobby's 3.13% weight loss in week 13 was counted as 2.36% due to the weight he gained last week.

== Elimination History ==
Contestant	Week #														
Contestant	Week 1	Week 2	Week 3	Week 4	Week 5	Week 6	Week 7	Week 8	Week 9	Week 10	Week 11	Week 12	Week 13	Week 14	Finale
Eliminated	~~Craig~~	Fernanda	~~Tanya~~	~~Ruben~~	Craig	~~Matt~~	Holley	Ruben	Bobby	Hap	Tumi	Jay	Marie	Jennifer	None
Eliminated	~~Craig~~	Fernanda	~~Tanya~~	~~Ruben~~	Craig	~~Matt~~	Holley	Ruben	Bobby	Matt	Tumi	Jay	Tanya	Chelsea	None
Rachel	X	X	X	X	X	X	X	X	X	X	?	Jay	X	X	The Biggest Loser
David	X	X	X	X	X	X	X	X	X	X	Tumi	Jay	X	X	Runner-Up
Bobby	X	X	X	X	X	X	X	X	X	E W9, R W11	Tumi	X	X	X	2nd Runner-Up
Chelsea	X	X	X	X	X	X	X	X	X	X	?	?	X	X	Eliminated Week 14
Jennifer	X	X	X	X	X	X	X	X	X	X	?	Jay	X	X	Eliminated Week 14
Tanya	X	X	Saved	X	X	X	X	X	X	X	X	Jay	X	Eliminated Week 13	
Marie	X	X	X	X	X	X	X	X	X	X	Tumi	Bobby	X	Eliminated Week 13	
Jay	X	X	X	X	X	X	X	X	X	X	Tumi	X	Eliminated Week 12		
Tumi	X	X	X	X	X	X	X	X	X	X	X	Eliminated Week 11			
Hap	X	X	X	X	X	X	X	X	X	X	Eliminated Week 10				
Matt	X	X	X	X	X	Saved	X	X	X	X	Eliminated Week 10				
Ruben	X	X	X	VOID	X	X	X	X	Eliminated Week 8						
Holley	X	X	X	X	X	X	X	Eliminated Week 7							
Craig	Saved	X	X	X	X	Eliminated Week 5									
Fernanda	X	X	Eliminated Week 2												

Valid vote cast
X Immunity
Saved Contestant saved by their respective trainer
X Below yellow line, unable to vote.
X Below red line, only player left on the losing team, or player on the losing team (of only 2 remaining contestants) with the lower percentage of weight loss, automatically eliminated
VOID Contestant returns due to voided elimination
X On the losing team, escaped the red line
X escaped elimination
Eliminated or not in house
Last person eliminated (at the finale) via public voting
WD Contestant quit the competition
? Vote was not revealed due to a unanimous vote
X Below yellow line
$250,000 winner (among the finalists)

== Weekly summary ==
=== Week 1: "Second Chances" ===
First aired October 15, 2013
For the first time in Biggest Loser history, the trainers got to pick the contestants that would train with them on the ranch. The contestants arrived on the ranch and had their first day of training. Ruben Studdard of American Idol was among the contestants. The next day, the trainers picked the contestants, the Red (Dolvett), White (Jillian), and Blue (Bob).

The teams were:

Red team: Ruben, Jennifer, Rachel, Tanya, David.

White team: Craig, Tumi, Jay, Fernanda, Marie.

Blue team: Holley, Chelsea, Bobby, Matt, Hap.

When it came to the weigh-in, Allison Sweeney announced that, for the first time, there will be a 'Trainer Save,' which saves one person from going home if he/she falls below the red line. At the weigh-in, Blue team weighed in first. Holley lost 16 pounds, Hap lost 17, Chelsea lost 12, Matt lost 23, and Bobby lost 20. Together, the Blue team lost 88 pounds for a 5.15% weight loss. The Red team needed to lose more than 85 pounds to stay safe. Ruben lost 21 pounds, Jennifer lost 11, Tanya lost 16, and Rachel lost 21, which means David would need to lose at least 17 pounds to keep his team safe. David steps on the scale...and loses a whopping 38 pounds!!! Together, the Red team lost 107 pounds for a 6.45% weight loss. The White team needed to lose more than 77 pounds to send Blue team to face the Red Line. Tumi lost 14 pounds, Fernanda lost 12, Marie lost nine, and Jay lost 23, which meant Craig would need to lose more than 19 pounds to save the White team. Unfortunately, Craig lost just 13 pounds and fell below the red line; however, Jillian used her 'Trainer Save' to save him from elimination.

=== Week 2: "A Game of Chance" ===
First aired October 22, 2013
This week each trainer rolled a die with their contestants' faces on them and that contestants' weight loss will be the only one that counts at the weigh-in. Meanwhile, the contestants faced their first challenge of the season. It started where the teams were strapped to one another and had to work together to fill up their tank with water to a certain level. In addition, they had to roll a die to determine how many buckets they could carry to their tank. The Blue team narrowly edged out the Red team for the victory, receiving an extra die to roll to see if they wanted to use that contestant for the weigh-in. When it came for the weigh-in, Fernanda was representing the White team, Tanya for the Red team, and Hap for the Blue team. Hap lost 13 pounds (3.37% of weight lost), but when Fernanda stepped on the scale, she only lost two pounds (0.84% weight lost). Tanya needed to lose more than two pounds to keep the Red team safe, and she succeeded with four (1.63% weight lost). The White Team lost the weigh-in again and Fernanda fell below the red line and was automatically eliminated.

=== Week 3: "The Auction" ===
First aired October 29, 2013
After Fernanda was eliminated, she lost 55 pounds at home, meaning she currently weighs 195 pounds. Her goal is to be 130 by the finale. For the third week, the contestants came to the gym to find all of the equipment had been taken out. Their next challenge was auctioning off the equipment to each team. The Red Team ended up getting sacks of sugar to work with, the White team ended up getting bench press and weight ball, and the Blue team ended up getting the rest of the equipment. When it came down for the weigh-in, the Red team lost for the first time when Tanya lost no weight and fell below the red line. However, Dolvett used his Trainer Save to save Tanya from going home, giving her another chance.

=== Week 4: "Trick or Treat" ===
First aired November 5, 2013

The challenge from this week was a Halloween-themed temptation. In the field, 100 pumpkins were up for grabs containing treats, cash, and the immunity prize. If a player received a treat, they had the option to eat to keep their team in the game, or pass, but once they passed, their entire team would be out. Whoever received the immunity prize would win immunity for their entire team. While Chelsea, David, and Hap managed to find cash in one of their pumpkins, everyone else was not so lucky, especially Jay, who ate 950 calories of treats. Eventually, Hap picked up a pumpkin that Tumi was about to go for. Hap opened the pumpkin up to find a chocolate bar. However, when he opens the wrapper, the White and Red teams are shocked to see Hap has found immunity, giving the Blue team their third consecutive challenge win. With the Red and White teams having already used their Trainer Saves, this immediately sets in that, as long as no one on the Blue Team gains weight, one person will be eliminated at the end of the week. During the workouts, Jillian worked mostly with Tumi and revealed some personal info to her about her past, which helped with her struggle during this week's workout.

The Blue team weighed in first; all five teammates lost weight and received immunity. The White team lost 27 pounds together as a team. The Red team needed to lose 36 pounds together as a team to avoid elimination. David, Rachel and Jennifer managed to pull off big numbers (Rachel lost 8, David lost 7, and Jennifer lost 6, respectively); unfortunately for Tanya, for the second week in a row, she failed to pull off another big number and only lost 3 pounds. Ruben was the last one to weigh in, and he had to lose more than 11 pounds to save his team from elimination; however, Ruben failed to reach the goal with only 5 pounds lost and fell below the red line, leading to his automatic—and shocking—elimination, much to the shock and dismay to his teammates, as well as all the other contestants and the trainers.

However, a subsequent foul committed by one of the trainers would be uncovered next week—alongside a violation of Standards and Practices; therefore, Ruben's elimination would be voided.

=== Week 5: "The Cook-Off" ===
First aired November 12, 2013

The teams took part of the cooking challenge, where each had to prepare a nutritious meal to serve. The blue team won their fourth consecutive challenge; it was noted that part of their victory was because they convinced one of the kids, Bingo, to eat the vegetables (which he initially disliked) of their meal.

Tanya's sickness caused her to withdraw from the workout with her team, but she eventually recovered enough to workout on her own to catch up.

Moments before this week's weight-in, Alison Sweeney explained that there was a rules violation: Jillian Michaels gave her team caffeine supplements without the doctor's permission. Because of this, everything was reset—including the last weight-in—and her team received a four-pound disadvantage—one for each remaining member. Also, the blue team regained their immunity that they won the previous week, and the eliminated player from last week, Ruben, would return to the ranch. Alison also revealed that it had been 2 weeks since the previous weigh-in, so everyone pulled double digits.

Once again, every member of the blue team lost weight—87 pounds (5.70%), reclaiming their immunity. The white team lost their third weigh-in, having lost 48 pounds (4.73%) (originally 52-4.37%, albeit due to their disadvantage), opposite of the red team's total of 58 pounds (5.59%). Rachel was the Biggest Loser of the week for the second week in a row, losing 18 pounds, 5.08% of her weight and dropping below 200 pounds. Craig (the recipient of Jillian's trainer save), although he pulled an impressive number, had the lowest combined percentage of the two-week weight loss, resulting in his elimination.

=== Week 6: "Remember Who You Are" ===
First aired November 19, 2013
Since his time on the competition, Craig lost 111 pounds, and now he is 274 pounds. He plans to lose 190 pounds by the finale. Ruben returned to the ranch and was warmly welcomed by the other contestants. Jillian and her team planned to move on after last week. This week's challenge was an obstacle course that had three players from each team cooperate in getting the team's colored balls to be bounced into three areas that awarded 1–3 points. The team that scores 30 points first wins. The red team won the challenge, ending the blue team's winning streak. Danni Allen, last season's winner, returned to the ranch to give the contestants Subway lunch, in which each healthy sub contained only 6–10 grams of fat. At the weigh-in, the red team continued the winning streak with David losing 17 lbs. This is the first time we see the blue team struggle, as they lose their first weigh-in and Matt has the lowest percentage of weight loss. However, Bob, seeing that every member of his team needs every push, decided to use his Trainer Save on Matt to keep him going.

=== Week 7: "Thanksgiving" ===
First aired November 26, 2013
In a Thanksgiving challenge to donate food to tornado victims in Oklahoma, the players had to load boxes of food weighing 15 and 30 pounds into trucks. The Blue Team gained yet another victory. Hap gets to meet his newborn son for the first time. The Blue Team had a special Thanksgiving dinner with their loved ones, and they, with Bob, shared the things that they are thankful for. Bob had a talk with one of his team members about coming out of the closet to his parents. At the weigh-in, the Blue team fell two pounds short of beating the White Team; as a result, Holley fell victim to the red line, resulting in a tearful elimination. Immediately after departure, Alison told the contestants that Holley will not be the only one leaving the ranch. This episode ends in a cliffhanger.

=== Week 8: "Take a Trainer Home" ===
First aired December 3, 2013

At home, Holley now weighs 260 lbs. and will enter the 2016 Olympics. The episode began with Ali announcing that one contestant will be picked to go home, but only their weight would count for their team. That contestant was eventually revealed to be Jay. He flew out with Jillian to Farmington, Missouri. While at Jay's home, Jillian discussed and talked with Jay to help him move forward after a disaster destroyed his first home. At the weigh-in, the Red team finished up with a weak 1.68%. Blue Team stayed safe (2.20% weight loss), mostly thanks to Bobby's 12-pound-weight-loss. For the White Team, Tumi and Marie lost seven and five pounds, respectively, but it was only Jay's weight that would count. Jay stepped on the scale, and lost an impressive 12 pounds for a 5.48% weight loss. This meant that the Red Team lost the weigh-in, and the shocker returns, as Ruben, who lost just two pounds, fell below the red line and was automatically eliminated for the second time.

=== Week 9: "Work Week" ===
First aired December 10, 2013
The contestants were taken to a diner for a pop challenge at the start of the show. They were asked multiple choice questions on obesity in the workplace. For every question a team answers correctly, they get a point. The team with the lowest points has to work at the diner all week. The White Team lost the challenge. Ruben reports that he has lost almost 100 pounds and is staying fit with a trainer and is selling his first album in February. Dolvett has offered to train Jennifer's daughter who suffers from childhood obesity. At the weigh-in Blue team weighed in first. With Hap posting his first double-digit number in several weeks, the Blue team finished with a 2.53% weight loss (27 pounds). The Red team needed to lose 23 pounds to stay safe. David lost five pounds, Tanya lost four for the fourth week in a row, and Jennifer lost seven, which meant Rachel would need to have lost more than six to save her team. Rachel steps on the scale, and loses seven! The Red team's total percentage of weight loss was 2.57%, barely scraping by Blue. In a surprising twist, working at the diner proved beneficial to the White team as they lost 21 pounds for a 3.24% weight loss. This meant that the Blue team lost the weigh-in for the third time in four weeks and with a three-pound weight loss, Bobby has the lowest percentage.

=== Week 10: "Singles" ===
First aired December 17, 2013
Bobby's transformation is shown at the beginning of episode. The contestants finally go to singles. It is announced that at the end of the season, there will be a Biggest Loser Triathlon with the winner getting an automatic place in the finale. In the first individual challenge, the 10 remaining contestants had to lift a bar supporting 20% of their current body weight as long as possible, but if their bar makes contact with the ring, they would be out. The winner would earn a one-pound advantage at this week's weigh-in. Tanya and Tumi quickly dropped out, while Jennifer was able to hold on for 20 minutes until she too dropped out. Hap dropped out after 25 minutes. Marie, Chelsea, and Matt all dropped out after another 20 minutes, leaving David, Jay, and Rachel as the last three standing. David dropped shortly after the 90-minute mark, and Jay dropped his bar two and a half minutes later, giving Rachel the win and the coveted one-pound advantage. In a season first, it is announced that two contestants will fall below the red line and be eliminated. At the weigh-in, Rachel weighed in first, posting a four-pound weight loss (five with her one-pound advantage). Chelsea also lost four pounds, but Jay and Marie each dropped five pounds. Tumi lost an impressive nine pounds, but David knocked it out of the park by dropped an amazing 12 pounds. Tanya was next, and she needed to lose more than five pounds to stay safe, and after four straight bad weeks, she desperately needed a big number. Tanya stepped on the scale and lost seven, keeping her above the red line and pushing her current weight to 201 pounds, two away from "One"derland. Hap posted a disappointing five pounds. Jennifer needed to lose more than four pounds to stay safe. She stepped on the scale and lost five pounds, falling into "One"derland in the process, and pushed Hap below the red line. Matt was the last to weigh in, and to push Chelsea below the red line, he had to lose more than five pounds. Matt stepped on the scale, and loses exactly five pounds, eliminating himself from the competition. But just as Matt and Hap were prepared to leave, they were informed that they were not leaving yet. The trainers were dismissed and it was announced that in the spirit of the season's Second Chance theme, tonight's eliminated contestants, along with all the other eliminated contestants, will return to the Ranch to compete for a chance to get back in the game.

=== Week 11: "Who Gets a Second Chance Back?" ===
First aired January 7, 2014
Note: This marks the return of the Two Hour Format.
The episode began with all of the eliminated contestants returning to try and get a second chance back on the ranch. The person with the highest percentage of weight loss would return. Matt and Hap, having already weighed in, had a total percentage of weight loss of 26.12% and 21.59%, respectively, which officially eliminated Hap from the competition. Ruben, Fernanda, Holley, and Craig posted big numbers, but not enough to overtake Matt. Last up was Bobby, and to return to the ranch, he had to lose more than 93 pounds. Bobby steps up on the scale, and loses 97, securing his spot back on the ranch as Team Aqua. For elimination this week there will be a yellow line this week for the first time this season where two contestants with the lowest percentage of weight loss will fall below it and be up for elimination.
For this week's challenge the contestants must bring up ten dumbbells and place it on a rack. The winner will receive $25,000 worth of gym equipment and the loser will receive a one-pound disadvantage at the weigh-in. There was also a gold dumbbell that adds 5 dumbbells to their score. Marie eventually found the golden dumbbell, but Jay edged out Rachel and Marie to win the challenge and equipment. Tanya came in last and received the one-pound disadvantage.
At home, Hap now weighs 270 lbs. and is keeping in touch with Matt to help lose weight. Also at home, Matt now weighs 240 lbs. and shops for a wedding shirt and finding the perfect place for him and his fiancé to get married. During the workouts Marie had a breakthrough with Jillian. Jay had a hard time with his workouts. And all of the contestants did average workouts of their own. At the weigh-in, Tanya fell into "One"derland with a 3-pound weight loss. Bobby dropped seven pounds, but David dropped an impressive 12 pounds for the second week in a row. Chelsea, Rachel, and Jennifer each dropped six pounds to save themselves from elimination. Jay, Marie, and Tumi then dropped four pounds each, which put Tumi and Tanya (with the one-pound disadvantage) below the yellow line and up for elimination. When it came down to the vote, it was a unanimous decision to vote off Tumi over Tanya.

=== Week 12: "Winter Olympics" ===
First aired January 14, 2014

At home, Tumi now weighs 180 lbs and picking out her wedding dress for her wedding. The contestants head to Park City, Utah in honor of the 2014 Winter Olympics in Sochi, Russia. They met 8-time Olympic champion, Apolo Ohno, who got to work out with the contestants in the Olympic gym. Then, they competed for $5,000 in a curling competition with Jessica Smith. Chelsea was on the verge of winning her first challenge, but suddenly, out of nowhere, Rachel came from behind, and knocked two of her curls simultaneously into the red circle to win the challenge. Meanwhile, Bob talked to Bobby about his eating and so the next day, Bob went to the store and bought food for breakfast. The next day, the contestants met bobsledding champion, Lolo Jones. They also faced their next challenge, which was to run a 4-mile bobsled course. Rachel easily won first place and won a bobsled ride and a 1 lb. advantage at the weigh-in. Back at the gym, Jennifer was still afraid of jumping on the box and Jillian tried to help Jennifer conquer her fear. Eventually, Jennifer successfully conquered her fears and jumped on the box. At the weigh-in, most players put up really low numbers. Rachel lost 6 pounds (7 with her one-pound advantage). Marie managed to lose 5, David lost 4, Chelsea lost 3, Tanya lost 2, and Jennifer lost no weight. But in a twisted turn of events, Jay gained 1 lb., and Bobby gained 2 lbs, keeping Jennifer safe. Jay and Bobby fell below the yellow line and Alison told Jay and Bobby to state their cases to help the remaining contestants vote. Ultimately, Jay received the most votes and was leaving Utah and the Biggest Loser.

=== Week 13: "Makeover Week" ===
First aired January 21, 2014
After coming back home, Jay now weighs 185 lbs. and is planning on entering in a roping competition after the finale. It's one of the most eagerly-anticipated episodes of "The Biggest Loser" season—the makeover episode! The fun began with fashion expert Tim Gunn, who worked his magic helping the contestants select stylish new outfits to flatter their new slimmer selves. Afterwards, celebrity hairstylist Ken Paves, whose clients have included Jennifer Lopez, Victoria Beckham, Lady Ga Ga and Eva Longoria, crafted incredible new looks for each of the remaining seven contestants, leading to amazing and dramatic transformations. Then they are whisked away to enjoy a special night out and heartwarming, emotional reunions with loved ones who have flown in to celebrate their big day. Later, it's back to reality and the ranch, where two players would fall under the red line at the weigh-in and be eliminated, revealing the final five contestants of the season. Marie and Tanya fell below the red line and were eliminated, leaving Rachel, David, Bobby, Chelsea, and Jennifer as the final five. They're also going to compete in the Biggest Loser Triathlon in the next episode.

=== Week 14: "One Last Chance" ===
First aired January 28, 2014

- Note: This marks the return of the one-hour format.

During the episode, Tanya weighs 174 lbs. and is planning to open a new restaurant called "Living Soul". Also, Marie weighed 150 lbs. and is announced that she will soon be pregnant. The stakes were higher than ever when the five final players competed in a "Biggest Loser" first—a sprint triathlon, which required them to swim – a half mile, bike 12 miles and run three miles. The triathlon winner will secure a coveted spot as a finalist, as well as a brand new Ford Fusion. Rachel won the triathlon, securing her spot as a finalist, as long as she did not gain weight. After the triathlon, it was an emotional trip down memory lane as the contestants watched footage of their journeys with their trainers, and saw firsthand how far they had all come since arriving on the ranch. Later, it's time for the last weigh-in before the finale, where two players will fall below the red line and go home, and two more will become finalists, joining the triathlon winner to compete for $250,000 and the title of "The Biggest Loser" at the season 15 finale. At the final weigh-in on campus, Rachel dropped one pound, securing her spot in the finals with her immunity. Chelsea lost seven pounds, while Jennifer dropped three. Bobby dropped a staggering 17 pounds to be a finalist and eliminate Jennifer. David was the last one to weigh-in, and needed to lose more than 11 pounds to be the third and last finalist. David steps on the scale....and dropped an amazing 16 pounds, sending Chelsea below the red line and to elimination. With the final three revealed, Rachel, Bobby, and David are going to compete for $250,000 at the finale.

Triathlon Results

- Rachel 1:32:11 1st place
- David 1:57:51 2nd place
- Chelsea 2:11:30 3rd place
- Jennifer 2:17:38 4th place
- Bobby 2:38:10 5th place

=== Finale ===
First aired February 4, 2014

All fifteen contestants reunited and weighed in for one last time in front of a live studio audience. Hap was the only contestant that gained weight since leaving the ranch; he gained six pounds. The record for the largest percentage lost by the At-Home contestants was broken by Tumi with 54.86%, who also claimed the At-Home prize of $100,000. Then, Ruben Studdard performed one of his songs in his new album "Unconditional Love" while the three finalists changed into their weigh-in clothes. Another record was broken for the largest percentage of weight loss by any contestant in the whole series. The crowned winner, Rachel, lost 59.62% and is currently the first contestant in The Biggest Loser history (worldwide) to end the season underweight. David also won the fan favorite award this season. Season 15 also featured a record number of contestants losing over 50% of their body weight, with four (Tumi, Bobby, David and Rachel). It is also the second season where all three finalists lost over 50% of their body weight, the other being season 7.

=== After the Show ===
On June 26, 2020, Hap Holmstead died at the age of 32.

== Reception ==
=== U.S. Nielsen ratings ===
Order	Episode Title	Airdate	Rating/Share (18–49)	Viewers (millions)	Rank (timeslot)	Rank (night)
1	"Second Chances"	October 15, 2013	2.3/7	7.16	3	6
2	"A Game of Chance"	October 22, 2013	2.0/6	6.70	3	7
3	"The Auction"	October 29, 2013	1.8/5	6.05	2	5
4	"Trick or Treat"	November 5, 2013	2.1/6	6.82	3	5
5	"The Cook Off"	November 12, 2013	1.8/5	6.26	3	7
6	"Remember Who You Are"	November 19, 2013	1.9/5	6.49	3	8
7	"Thanksgiving"	November 26, 2013	2.0/6	6.61	3	8
8	"Take A Trainer Home"	December 3, 2013	2.1/6	6.76	1	3
9	"Work Week"	December 10, 2013	1.9/6	6.24	3	7
10	"Singles"	December 17, 2013	2.0/6	6.99	2	5
11	"Who Gets A Second Chance Back?"	January 7, 2014	1.7/5	5.46	3	5
12	"Winter Olympics"	January 14, 2014	1.7/5	5.56	3	6
13	"Makeover Week"	January 21, 2014	1.9/5	6.72	1	2
14	"One Last Chance"	January 28, 2014	1.7/5	6.56	2	2
15	"Finale"	February 4, 2014	2.2/6	7.38		

=== Controversy ===
Upon the finale's airing, many commentators gave worrying reactions to the substantial amount of weight Rachel lost prior to winning. In a statement to The Huffington Post, trainer Jillian Michaels admitted "I was stunned. Obviously, I thought she had lost too much weight." Prominent fitness blogger Maria Kang opined, "When the show's newest winner, Rachel Frederickson, appeared Tuesday gaunt and emaciated after losing 155 pounds in just four months, my instincts told me hers was not a healthy journey."

== See also ==
- The Biggest Loser (American TV series)
- The Biggest Loser
