= Sorry 2004 =

2003 single by Ruben Studdard

Single by Ruben Studdard

from the album Soulful
- Released: December 1, 2003
- Recorded: 2003
- Length: 4:22
- Label: J; 19; S
- Songwriters: Harvey Mason, Jr.; Damon Thomas; Ronnie Jackson; Antonio Dixon; Eric Dawkins
- Producers: The Underdogs (Damon Thomas and Harvey Mason, Jr.)

Ruben Studdard singles chronology
"Superstar" (2003)	"Sorry 2004" (2003)	"What If" (2004)

"Sorry 2004" is a song by the American R&B singer Ruben Studdard. It was released as a single from his first album, Soulful, in December 2003. The song peaked at number nine on the US Billboard Hot 100 chart.

== Chart performance ==
"Sorry 2004" spent 20 weeks on the US Billboard Hot 100, peaking at number nine on February 28, 2004. It also charted on the Billboard Hot R&B/Hip-Hop Singles & Tracks chart, reaching number two on March 13, 2004, and staying on the chart for 28 weeks.

== Music video ==
The music video was directed by Bryan Barber and features Reagan Gomez-Preston as Studdard's love interest.

== Charts ==
=== Weekly charts ===
Chart (2004)	Peak position
US Billboard Hot 100	9
US Hot R&B/Hip-Hop Songs (Billboard)	2
US Rhythmic Airplay (Billboard)	23

=== Year-end charts ===
Chart (2004)	Position
US Billboard Hot 100	53
US Hot R&B/Hip-Hop Singles & Tracks (Billboard)	15

== Release history ==
Region	Date	Format(s)	Label(s)	Ref.
United States	December 1, 2003	Rhythmic contemporary; urban; urban adult contemporary radio	J; 19; S	
United States	December 8, 2003	Contemporary hit; adult contemporary radio	J; 19; S	
