= Ruben Studdard =

American singer (born 1978)

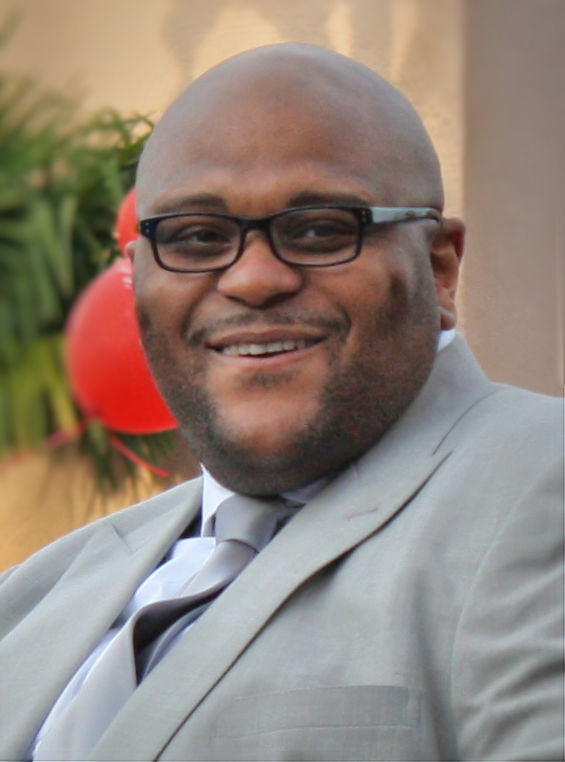
- Studdard in 2009

Background information
- Born: Christopher Theodore Ruben Studdard; September 12, 1978 (age 48); Frankfurt, West Germany
- Origin: Birmingham, Alabama, U.S.
- Genres: R&B; pop; gospel
- Occupations: Singer; actor
- Instrument: Vocals
- Years active: 2002–present
- Labels: 19; J; Hickory; Shanachie; Verve

Christopher Theodore Ruben Studdard (born September 12, 1978) is an American singer and actor. He rose to fame as the winner of the second season of American Idol and received a Grammy Award nomination in 2003 for Best Male R&B Vocal Performance for his recording of "Superstar". In the years following Idol, Studdard has released seven studio albums, including his platinum-selling debut, Soulful, and the top-selling gospel follow-up, I Need an Angel. He is most well known for his recording career, which has produced hits including "Flying Without Wings", "Sorry 2004", and "Change Me", but he has also segued into television and stage work. Most notably, he starred as Fats Waller in a national tour revival of Ain't Misbehavin', which spawned a Grammy-nominated soundtrack.

In 2013, Studdard appeared as a contestant on the fifteenth season of weight-loss competition show The Biggest Loser. He later signed to Verve Records and collaborated with the label's chairman, David Foster, on Studdard's sixth studio album, Unconditional Love, in 2014. That album received strong reviews as a return-to-form and included a tour with Lalah Hathaway. In 2018, Studdard, who has long been compared to R&B singer Luther Vandross, released a cover album called Ruben Sings Luther and launched his Always & Forever national tour.

He made his Broadway theater debut with his Idol runner-up Clay Aiken in December 2018 in Ruben & Clay's First Annual Christmas Carol Family Fun Pageant Spectacular Reunion Show (aka Ruben & Clay's Christmas Show) at the Imperial Theatre. In 2023, Studdard and Aiken reunited for Twenty The Tour, a joint nationwide tour in celebration of the twentieth anniversary of their American Idol debut. Studdard also continues to tour the United States in support of his Ruben Sings Luther album, and in 2023, launched his eighth studio album, The Way I Remember It.

== Early life ==
Studdard was born in Frankfurt, West Germany, to American parents, while his father was stationed there with the U.S. Army, and grew up in Birmingham, Alabama. Some sources give Birmingham, Alabama as his birthplace, but Studdard has said in interviews that he was born in Frankfurt while his father was stationed there with the U.S. Army. The youngest son of two teachers, at the age of three, he sang for the first time at the Rising Star Baptist Church in his hometown of Birmingham. He continued singing gospel in church, performing solos as a child while his mother sang in the local choir. While at Huffman High School, he played football for which he received a scholarship to Alabama A&M University. While at Alabama A&M, he joined the Omicron Delta chapter of Phi Mu Alpha Sinfonia, the men's music fraternity of North America.

After growing up listening to his mother's Donny Hathaway albums, Fred Hammond, and gospel music, Studdard began to pursue a career in the music industry, majoring in voice studies at Alabama A&M. He sang with Just a Few Cats, a popular local Birmingham jazz and R&B band founded by members of Ray Reach's UAB Jazz Ensemble, along with other local musicians. Years later, Studdard stated: "A lot of people don't realize how hard I was trying to get into the business before American Idol. I was making demos and just working so hard." A backup singer from Just a Few Cats asked him to accompany her to Nashville, Tennessee for an audition on the 2003 second season of American Idol.

== American Idol ==
When auditioning, Studdard sang Stevie Wonder's "Ribbon in the Sky". On American Idol, he impressed viewers with his performances of the Leon Russell/Bonnie Bramlett song "Superstar" and the Peabo Bryson/Regina Belle duet "A Whole New World". During his time on the show, Studdard received praise from music legends such as Lionel Richie, Neil Sedaka, Robin Gibb of the Bee Gees, Luther Vandross, and Gladys Knight.

During the televised competition, Studdard gained the nickname "Velvet Teddy Bear" and was noted for his shirts printed with "205," the telephone area code of his hometown of Birmingham.

He won the contest over runner-up Clay Aiken by only 134,000 votes out of 24,000,000 cast in the May 2003 finale, becoming the second American Idol winner. Alabama Governor Bob Riley declared March 11, 2003, as "Ruben Studdard Day".

=== Performances and results ===
| Week | Theme | Song | Original artist | Result |
|---|---|---|---|---|
| Top 32 | Contestant's choice | "Superstar" | Delaney & Bonnie | Advanced |
| Top 12 | Motown | "Baby I Need Your Loving" | Four Tops | Safe |
| Top 11 | Movie Soundtracks | "A Whole New World" - Aladdin | Brad Kane & Lea Salonga | Safe |
| Top 10 | Country rock | "Sweet Home Alabama" | Lynyrd Skynyrd | Safe |
| Top 8^{1} | Disco | "Can't Get Enough of Your Love, Babe" | Barry White | Safe |
| Top 8 | Billboard Number Ones | "Kiss and Say Goodbye" | The Manhattans | Safe |
| Top 7 | Billy Joel | "Just the Way You Are" | Billy Joel | Safe |
| Top 6 | Diane Warren | "Music of My Heart" | 'N Sync and Gloria Estefan | Safe |
| Top 5 | 1960s | "Ain't Too Proud to Beg" | The Temptations | Bottom 2^{2} |
| Top 5 | Neil Sedaka | "Breaking Up Is Hard to Do" | Neil Sedaka | Bottom 2^{2} |
| Top 4 | Bee Gees | "Nights on Broadway" | Bee Gees | Safe |
| Top 4 | Bee Gees | "How Can You Mend a Broken Heart" | Bee Gees | Safe |
| Top 3 | Random | "Signed, Sealed, Delivered I'm Yours" | Stevie Wonder | Safe |
| Top 3 | Judges' Choice | "Smile" - Simon Cowell | Charlie Chaplin | Safe |
| Top 3 | Idol's Choice | "If Ever You're in My Arms Again" | Peabo Bryson | Safe |
| Top 2 | Finale | "A House Is Not a Home" | Dionne Warwick | Winner |
| Top 2 | Finale | "Imagine" | John Lennon | Winner |
| Top 2 | Finale | "Flying Without Wings" | Westlife | Winner |

- ^Note 1 Due to Corey Clark's disqualification, the Top 9 performances became Top 8 when no one was eliminated.
- ^Note 2 When Ryan Seacrest announced the results for this particular night, Studdard was among the Bottom 2 but declared safe, as Trenyce was eliminated.

== Career ==
=== 2003–2004: Soulful ===
Studdard released his first single, a cover of Westlife's "Flying Without Wings" (which he had sung on the American Idol finale), produced by The Underdogs and Babyface. Fueled largely by sales, it debuted at number two on the Billboard Hot 100. In December 2003, advance orders for his album Soulful topped the one million mark before it was released in stores. The album debuted at number one on the Billboard 200 album chart that month, selling over 400,000 copies in its first week and attaining the second highest first-week sales of any American Idol winner and the highest ever by a debut male R&B act. The single "Sorry 2004" from this album found substantial airplay, reaching number nine in the Billboard Hot 100 and number two on the Billboard R&B singles chart. Studdard received a Grammy Award nomination in December 2003 for Best Male R&B Vocal Performance for "Superstar", nominated alongside his idol Luther Vandross, who ultimately won the category. In March 2004, Ruben won the NAACP Outstanding New Artist award.

=== 2004–2005: I Need an Angel ===
Studdard released the gospel album I Need an Angel on November 23, 2004. The title track and first single "I Need an Angel" was a cover of 2002 single performed by R&B singer Daniel DeBourg and written by R. Kelly. The album sold over 96,000 copies in its first week, entering the Gospel charts at number one and number twenty on the Billboard 200 chart. It since has sold over 500,000 copies, securing Gold certification from the Recording Industry Association of America. It was also number one on the 2005 Billboard Year-End Gospel Albums Chart.

In March 2005, Studdard filed a lawsuit against his godfather and business advisor Ronald Edwards. The suit alleges that Edwards ran up $156,000 on Studdard's credit cards and stole $90,000 from his checking account. Edwards filed a countersuit. On June 15, 2006, Studdard was awarded $500,000 for personal losses and another $1.5 million in punitive damages.

Between his second and third albums, Studdard began a diet and fitness program to deal with his weight, out of concern for a family history of diabetes and hypertension, resulting in his losing over 70 pounds on a vegetarian diet.

In 2004, Studdard made a cameo in the film Scooby-Doo 2: Monsters Unleashed, singing a cover of Earth, Wind & Fire's "Shining Star". He also made guest appearances on TV shows including Life on a Stick, 8 Simple Rules, One on One, All of Us and Eve.

=== 2006–2008: The Return ===
Studdard's third album, The Return, was released in October 2006. Returning to R&B music on this album, Studdard collaborated with a variety of producers, including Scott Storch, Stargate, and Ne-Yo. Studdard also co-wrote several songs on the album. The Return sold 71,000 copies in its first week to open at number eight on the Billboard 200 album chart. The lead single, "Change Me", reached number one on Billboard's Urban Contemporary chart, while the follow-up track, "Make Ya Feel Beautiful", also made a strong impression on the R&B charts.

Studdard continued to tour, saying he would play a variety of music: "Coming out to my show is like coming to my house. I'll play the songs I love. It's like a party. For me, a party has all different types of music happening."

Studdard appeared on the finale of American Idol season 6 in May 2007. He spent a few weeks touring with Robin Givens in the comedy-drama Heaven I Need a Hug and prepared to take on the role of Fats Waller in a national tour of Ain't Misbehavin' in 2008. The tour is scheduled to begin November 17, 2008, in Atlanta, GA, and end May 14, 2009, in Syracuse, NY.

In December 2007, Studdard had been dropped from his record company, J Records, due to poor sales of The Return and "[falling] short of expectations". He remained under contract with 19 Recordings and was assigned the high-profile position of performing the seventh season farewell song on American Idol, a recording of Kenny Loggins' "Celebrate Me Home", in a new version produced by Terry Lewis and Jimmy Jam.

Studdard performed "Celebrate Me Home" live on May 20, 2008, at the Nokia Theatre for the first night of the two-night grand finale of American Idol's seventh season. In 2008, Studdard also collaborated with gospel singer Deitrick Haddon and duo Mary Mary on the hit gospel song "Love Him As I Do".

=== 2009–2010: Love Is ===
Studdard announced that his next album, to be released May 19, 2009, would be released on Sony Music offshoot Hickory Records. The new album, entitled Love Is, was produced by Jimmy Jam and Terry Lewis. The album spawned the singles "Together" and "Don't Make 'Em Like U No More".

Love Is was released on May 19, 2009, to positive reviews. The album, which features a mix of covers and original songs, sold 15,200 units in its first week to debut at number 36 on the Billboard 200, number five on Independent Albums, and number eight on Top R&B/Hip-Hop Albums.

Studdard appeared with the "David Foster and Friends" ten-city tour beginning October 21, 2009, in Chicago, Illinois, and ending November 8, 2009, in Vancouver, Canada. A compilation album, Playlist: The Very Best of Ruben Studdard was released on January 26, 2010, by Sony's Legacy Recordings.

Studdard returned to the American Idol stage on March 31, 2010, to perform "Don't Make 'Em Like U No More". In his on-camera interview with Ryan Seacrest after his performance, he announced that he would be touring with Clay Aiken in the summer.

Studdard and Aiken brought their Timeless tour to cities in the US and Canada beginning in Asheville, North Carolina on July 23, 2010, and ending in Biloxi, Mississippi on August 14. Instead of a concert focusing on each singer's recordings, Studdard and Aiken opted for a variety show format covering medleys of songs from the 1960s to the 1990s, with a few solos and interspersed with comedy bits.

=== 2010–2013: Letters from Birmingham ===
In 2011, Studdard signed with Shanachie Entertainment. His first album for the label and fifth studio release overall, Letters from Birmingham, was released in March 2012.

A concept album that traces a relationship through a series of romantic letters, Letters from Birmingham received mostly positive reviews, especially for his duet with Chrisette Michele, "Do It Right", which was praised as "sublime" and "tantalizing". The album also included covers of Bobby Brown's "Rock Wit'cha" and "Pure Imagination" from Willy Wonka and the Chocolate Factory, recast as a love song. Since its release, "Letters from Birmingham" has sold 22,000 copies, and the lead single, "June 28 (I'm Single)", which referenced his marriage and subsequent divorce, reached the top 20 of Billboard's urban charts.

=== 2013–2014: The Biggest Loser and Unconditional Love ===
Studdard joined the cast of the fifteenth season of the NBC weight loss competition show The Biggest Loser, and was credited as its first-ever celebrity contestant. At 6'3 and 462 pounds, Studdard had the highest starting weight and BMI of the entire cast. A member of the show's Red Team, Studdard was first eliminated in the fourth week after he failed to make his weight loss goal. However, because opposing coach Jillian Michaels had given her team caffeine pills in violation of the rules, Studdard's elimination was voided and he returned before once again being eliminated during the competition's eighth week.

At the show's finale on February 4, 2014 (which coincided with the release of Studdard's newest album, Unconditional Love), it was revealed that he had lost a total of 119 pounds for an ending weight of 343 pounds. Studdard credited the weight loss for improving his ability to perform onstage. During the finale, Studdard also performed his new album's lead single, "Meant to Be", accompanied by the song's co-writer and producer, David Foster, on piano.

Unconditional Love is Studdard's sixth studio album and first with his new label, Verve Records. Foster, who has won 16 Grammy Awards, was the executive producer of the disc, which primarily consists of covers of love songs along with two originals, including "Meant to Be". Studdard has called it "the album that everybody expected from me when I won American Idol." The album features collaborations with Stevie Wonder, Lalah Hathaway, and Eric Benet, and includes covers of songs originally performed by artists such as Paul McCartney, Donny Hathaway, Bonnie Raitt, Marvin Gaye, and Peabo Bryson. Since its release, the album has received some of Studdard's best reviews of his career. According to critics, the album "finds Studdard at the top of his game vocally" and he hits his stride, "exuding grace, confidence and class" as he successfully positions himself as a "stylish crooner". Unconditional Love debuted at No. 46 on the Billboard 200 and #7 on Billboard's R&B Albums chart.

Studdard supported the release of Unconditional Love with the national Born Again Tour with his collaborator Lalah Hathaway.

=== 2015–2018: Ruben Sings Luther and Broadway debut ===
Studdard continues to appear regularly on American Idol, including mentoring and performing with contestants in its farewell season on Fox. He released a new single, "Can't Nobody Love You", on April 8, 2016, and appeared on several talk shows to promote the song. In 2017, he released a cover of "A Change Is Gonna Come" and guested on Patti LaBelle's holiday album, performing "Your Presence with Me" and "Ave Maria".

In 2018, Studdard, who had long been compared to Luther Vandross, released a tribute album, Ruben Sings Luther, on the SEG Music label. He supported the album with the Always & Forever national tour. In an interview with People Magazine, Studdard said that "Since I won American Idol, people have been asking for me to sing Luther songs for a long time. I thought, 'OK. Do you want to hear it? I might as well do it. I thought it was the perfect time to pay homage to one of the greatest song interpreters of all time."

Both the album and tour received strong reviews, with Variety noting that "Studdard truly took wing and made the music of Vandross his own" on tour and The Philadelphia Inquirer calling the album a "full-on lush-and-funky tribute".

Studdard made his Broadway theater debut in December 2018, reuniting with Clay Aiken in Ruben & Clay's First Annual Christmas Carol Family Fun Pageant Spectacular Reunion Show (aka Ruben & Clay's Christmas Show) at the Imperial Theatre, with previews beginning December 7 and the show officially opening December 11. The show continued through December 30, with a portion of ticket sales benefitting the National Inclusion Project.

=== 2019–present: Twenty The Tour and The Way I Remember It ===
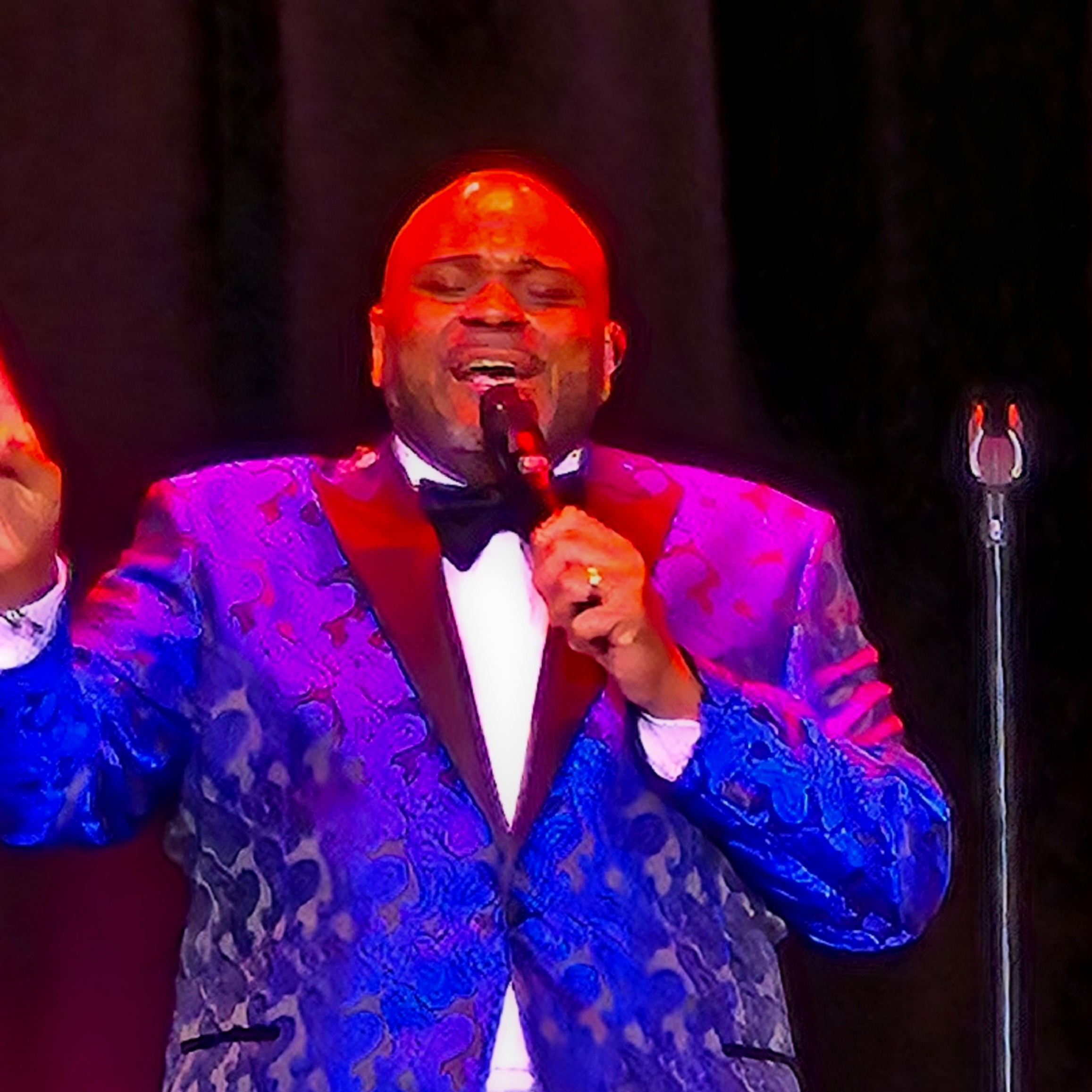
Ruben Studdard performing at The Tracy Performing Arts Center in The Villages, Florida.

Studdard continued to support his Ruben Sings Luther album with a tour of the same name, performing more than 95 shows throughout the United States from 2018 through 2023. In 2023 Studdard performed a joint tour with American Idol runner-up Clay Aiken, Twenty The Tour, across the United States and Canada in celebration of the 20th anniversary since their debuts on Idol.

In 2023, Studdard signed a new record deal with SoNo Recording Group and working on a new album with veteran songwriter and producer Balewa Muhammad.

On October 27, 2023, Studdard released his eighth studio album, The Way I Remember It, a ten-track album and his first album of original music since 2014's Unconditional Love. The album was preceded by the release of three singles: "The Way I Remember It", "W.I.F.E." and "Masterpiece". A music video for "Masterpiece" was released on November 4, 2023.

In 2024, Studdard paired up with Clay Aiken when they competed in eleventh season of The Masked Singer as "Beets". They were eliminated during the Group B finals alongside Corey Feldman as "Seal".

== Acting ==
Studdard has worked as an actor in several roles, including single-episode appearances on the television series 8 Simple Rules, Life on a Stick, All of Us, Eve, and One on One, as well as a cameo appearance in the film Scooby Doo 2: Monsters Unleashed. He has also appeared in a television commercial for a Birmingham-area Kia dealer.

Studdard headlined the revival tour of Ain't Misbehavin', starring alongside fellow American Idol alumni Trenyce and Frenchie Davis. Starring as Fats Waller, Studdard received positive reviews and was part of the cast recording album released by Rhino Records on January 13, 2009. The album was nominated for the Grammy Award for Best Musical Theater Album.

== Advocacy ==
Studdard's love of music led him to create The Ruben Studdard Foundation for the Advancement of Children in the Music Arts. The foundation's mission statement says its aim is "to promote the essential role of the arts in education through learning initiatives for the development of students in the Greater Birmingham Area."

Studdard also signed on as an official spokesperson for "Be Sickle Smart", a nationwide grassroots health-education program aimed at increasing awareness of iron overload among people living with sickle-cell disease.

== Personal life ==
Studdard met Surata Zuri McCants in October 2006, when he was signing CDs at a Walmart in Atlanta. On June 28, 2008, Studdard married McCants in a short, private ceremony in Mountain Brook, Alabama. On November 16, 2011, Studdard's attorney announced that Studdard was in the process of a divorce. Studdard's divorce was finalized in April 2012.

In 2018 Studdard married real estate agent Kristen Moore. The couple has two children.

Studdard received an honorary Master of Arts degree from Alabama A&M University, where he received a bachelor's degree in vocal studies. The honorary degree was conferred at the university's December 2015 commencement. He is a member of Phi Mu Alpha Sinfonia fraternity. In 2022, Studdard taught a master class for performing arts majors at the University of Tennessee at Chattanooga.

== Awards and nominations ==
| Year | Award | Category | Work | Result |
|---|---|---|---|---|
| 2003 | Teen Choice Awards | Choice Male Reality/Variety Star | American Idol | Won |
| 2003 | Billboard Music Awards | Top R&B/Hip-Hop Sales Single | Superstar/Flying Without Wings | Won |
| 2004 | American Music Awards | Favorite Male R&B Artist | Soulful | Nominated |
| 2004 | BET Awards | Best Male R&B Artist | Soulful | Nominated |
| 2004 | BET Awards | Best New Artist | Soulful | Nominated |
| 2004 | Grammy Awards | Best Male R&B Vocal Performance | Superstar | Nominated |
| 2004 | Image Awards | Outstanding Male Artist | Soulful | Nominated |
| 2004 | Image Awards | Outstanding New Artist | Soulful | Won |
| 2004 | Soul Train Awards | Best New R&B/Soul or Rap New Artist | Superstar | Nominated |
| 2005 | BET Awards | Best Gospel Artist | I Need an Angel | Nominated |
| 2005 | Billboard Music Awards | Top Gospel Artist | I Need an Angel | Won |
| 2005 | Billboard Music Awards | Top Gospel Album | I Need an Angel | Won |
| 2009 | GMA Dove Award | Urban Recorded Song of the Year | "Love Him Like I Do" (with Deitrick Haddon and Mary Mary) | Nominated |
| 2012 | GMA Dove Award | Special Event Album of the Year | Medicine: Live At The Black Academy | Nominated |

== Discography ==
=== Studio albums ===
List of albums, with selected chart positions and certifications
| Title | Album details | Peak chart positions | | | | Certifications | Sales |
| Title | Album details | US | US R&B | US Gospel | US Indie | Certifications | Sales |
|---|---|---|---|---|---|---|---|
| Soulful | Release date: December 9, 2003; Label: J Records; Format: CD, digital download | 1 | 1 | — | — | RIAA: Platinum | US: 1,800,000 |
| I Need an Angel | Release date: November 23, 2004; Label: J Records; Format: CD, digital download | 20 | 6 | 1 | — | RIAA: Gold | US: 483,000 |
| The Return | Release date: October 17, 2006; Label: J Records; Format: CD, digital download | 8 | 2 | — | — | | US: 238,000 |
| Love Is | Release date: May 19, 2009; Label: Hickory Records; Format: CD, digital download | 36 | 8 | — | 5 | | US: 50,000 |
| Letters from Birmingham | Release date: March 13, 2012; Label: Shanachie Records; Format: CD, digital download | 73 | 12 | — | — | | US: 22,000 |
| Unconditional Love | Release date: February 4, 2014; Label: The Verve Music Group; Format: CD, digital download | 46 | 11 | — | — | | US: 6,000 |
| Ruben Sings Luther | Release date: March 9, 2018; Label: SEG Music; Format: CD, digital download | — | — | — | — | | |
| The Way I Remember It | Release date: October 27, 2023; Label: SoNo Recording Group; Format: CD, digital download | — | — | — | — | | |

=== Compilation albums ===
| Title | Album details |
|---|---|
| Playlist: The Very Best of Ruben Studdard | Release date: January 26, 2010; Label: Sony Legacy; Format: CD, digital download |

=== Singles ===
List of singles, with selected chart positions, showing year released and album name
| Title | Year | Peak chart positions | | | | | Album |
| Title | Year | US | US R&B | Adult R&B | US A/C | US Gospel | Album |
|---|---|---|---|---|---|---|---|
| "Flying Without Wings" | 2003 | 2 | 13 | — | 27 | — | Non-album single |
| "Superstar" | 2003 | — | 2 | 6 | — | — | Soulful |
| "Have Yourself a Merry Little Christmas" (with Tamyra Gray) | 2003 | — | — | — | 25 | — | American Idol: The Great Holiday Classics |
| "Sorry 2004" | 2004 | 9 | 2 | 1 | — | — | Soulful |
| "What If" | 2004 | — | 47 | 14 | — | — | Soulful |
| "I Need an Angel" | 2004 | — | — | 21 | 32 | 11 | I Need an Angel |
| "Ain't No Need to Worry" (featuring Mary Mary) | 2005 | — | — | 31 | — | — | I Need an Angel |
| "Change Me" | 2006 | 94 | 18 | 1 | — | — | The Return |
| "Make Ya Feel Beautiful" | 2007 | — | 32 | 6 | — | — | The Return |
| "Love Him Like I Do" (with Deitrick Haddon and Mary Mary) | 2008 | — | — | — | — | 9 | Revealed |
| "Celebrate Me Home" | 2008 | — | — | — | — | — | Non-album single |
| "Together" | 2009 | — | 60 | 15 | — | — | Love Is |
| "Don't Make 'Em Like U No More" | 2009 | — | 32 | 12 | — | — | Love Is |
| "June 28th (I'm Single)" | 2012 | — | 61 | 14 | — | — | Letters from Birmingham |
| "Meant to Be" | 2014 | — | — | — | — | — | Unconditional Love |
| "Love, Love, Love" | 2014 | — | — | 25 | — | — | Unconditional Love |
| "Can't Nobody Love You" | 2016 | — | — | — | — | — | Non-album single |
| "The Way I Remember It" | 2023 | — | — | — | — | — | The Way I Remember It |
| "W.I.F.E." | 2023 | — | — | — | — | — | The Way I Remember It |
| "Masterpiece" | 2023 | — | — | — | — | — | The Way I Remember It |

=== Single certifications ===
| Year | Title | USA | CAN |
|---|---|---|---|
| 2003 | "Flying Without Wings" | Gold | 3× Platinum |

=== Other albums ===
- American Idol Season 2: All-Time Classic American Love Songs (2003)
  - "What the World Needs Now" (with Season 2 Finalists)
  - "God Bless the U.S.A. (Proud to Be an American)" (with Season 2 Finalists)
  - "Superstar"
- American Idol: The Great Holiday Classics (2003)
  - "Have Yourself a Merry Little Christmas"
  - "Santa Claus Is Coming to Town" (American Idol Ensemble)
  - "This Christmas"
- Genius & Friends (2005)
  - "Imagine" with Ray Charles and The Harlem Gospel Singers
- Revealed (2008)
  - "Love Him Like I Do" with Deitrick Haddon and Mary Mary
- Ain't Misbehavin': The 30th Anniversary Cast Recording (2009)
  - "Honeysuckle Rose" a duet with Frenchie Davis
  - "The Jitterbug Waltz" with Patrice Covington & Company
  - "Lounging At The Waldorf" with Frenchie Davis, Trenyce Cobbins & Patrice Covington
  - "Your Feet's Too Big"
- Hit Man Returns: David Foster & Friends (2011)
  - "Home" with David Foster
- Unbelievable (2011)
  - "Saturday Love" with Keke Wyatt
- Sing Pray Love, Vol. 1: Sing (2014)
  - "Back 2 Love" with Kelly Price
- Patti LaBelle Presents: Home for the Holidays with Friends (2017)
  - "Don't Save it All for Christmas"
  - "Your Presence with Me"
  - "Let It Snow"
  - "Ave Maria"

== Filmography ==
- One on One (2004)
- Scooby Doo 2: Monsters Unleashed (2004)
- 8 Simple Rules (2005)
- Life on a Stick (2005)
- All of Us (2005)
- Natural Born Komics (2006) (direct-to-DVD)
- Eve (2006)
- Lifted (2011)
- The Perfect Gift (2011)

== See also ==
- List of Idols winners
