= Change Me (Ruben Studdard song) =

2006 single by Ruben Studdard

Single by Ruben Studdard

from the album The Return
- Released: July 31, 2006
- Recorded: 2006
- Genre: R&B
- Length: 3:49
- Label: J Records
- Songwriter(s): Harvey Mason, Jr. Damon Thomas; Steve Russell; Tank; Antonio Dixon; Luke Boyd
- Producer(s): The Underdogs

Ruben Studdard singles chronology
"I Need an Angel" (2004)	"Change Me" (2006)	"Make Ya Feel Beautiful" (2007)

Music video
- "Change Me" on YouTube

"Change Me" is the first single from Ruben Studdard's third album The Return. The song is produced by The Underdogs and written by Luke Boyd, Tank, Steve Russell, Damon Thomas, Harvey Mason, Jr., and Antonio Dixon. The song follows Ruben complaining about his girlfriend trying to change what he's become. The song peaked at number 94 on the Billboard Hot 100 and number eighteen on the Hot R&B/Hip-Hop Songs chart.

== Music video ==
The video shows Studdard dealing with his girlfriend (played by America's Next Top Model Cycle 5 contestant Bre Scullark) trying to change him from his celebrity life. Scenes in the video show her spending his credit card on a dining with her friends, and having the movers take his recording equipment into the garage.

A part of the song: "What if I talked about your face in the morning. 'Cause we know that you ain't cute in the morning," matches the girlfriend waking up with a bad hair day. They both become distraught like him signing autographs around her, and blocks her face during a party. The ending has Ruben packing her belongings in her luggage case and shows her the door out.

== Charts ==
=== Weekly charts ===
Chart (2006)	Peak position
US Billboard Hot 100	94
US Hot R&B/Hip-Hop Songs (Billboard)	18
US Hot Adult R&B Airplay (Billboard)	1

=== Year-end charts ===
Chart (2007)	Position
US Hot R&B/Hip-Hop Songs (Billboard)	64

== Release history ==
Region	Date	Label	Format
United States	July 13, 2006	J Records	Airplay (radio)
United States	September 5, 2006	J Records	Digital download
