= Mandisa discography =

Mandisa albums discography
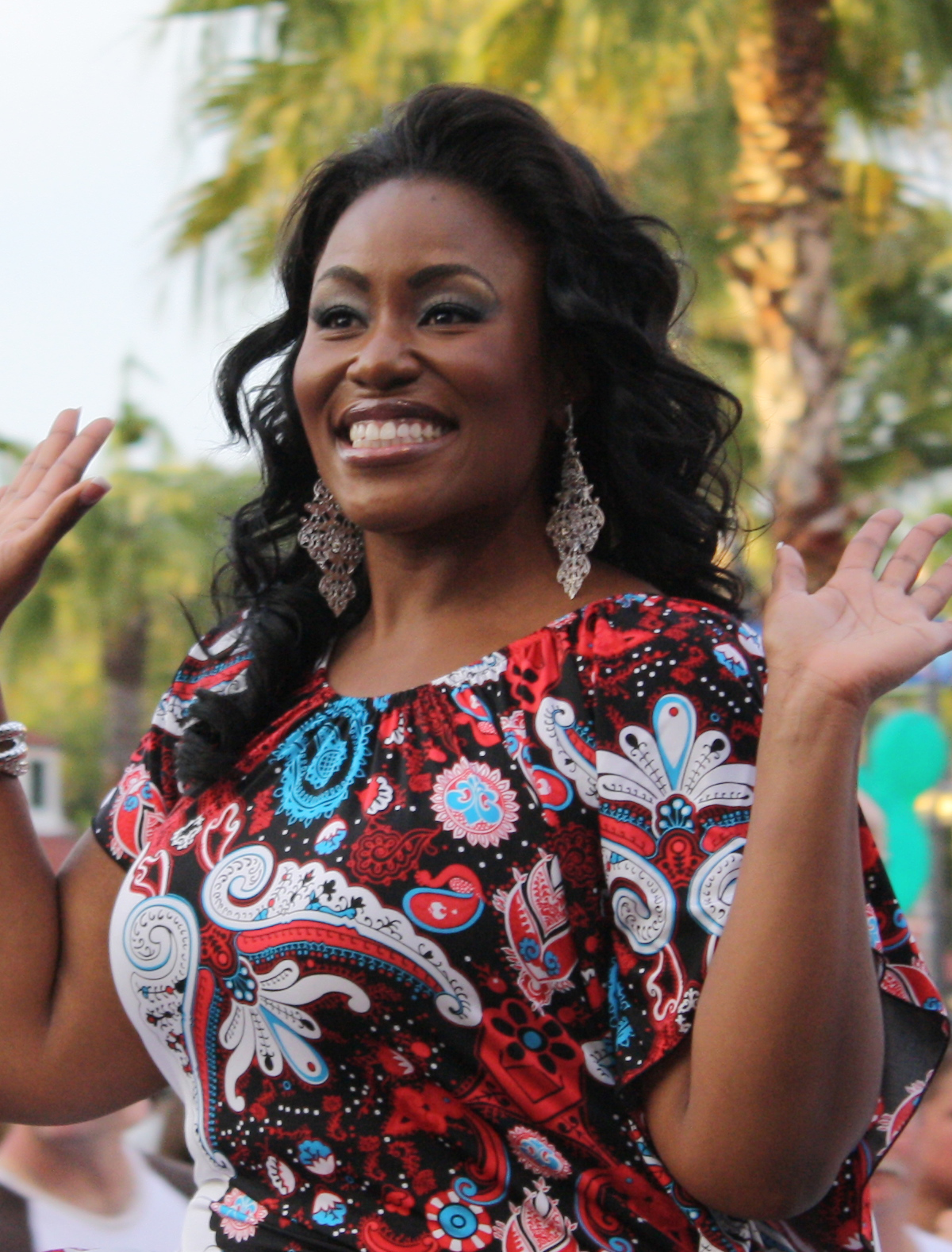
- Mandisa in The American Idol Experience motorcade at Walt Disney World.
- Studio albums: 5
- Extended plays: 1
- Singles: 15
- Music videos: 3

This is a discography of Mandisa, an African-American gospel and contemporary Christian artist. She released six studio albums, including one Christmas album. Her first album True Beauty debuted at number one on the Top Christian Albums chart, and at number 47 on the Billboard Top 200. She also released a Christmas EP entitled Christmas Joy on November 20, 2007. In 2008, she released her second studio album, a full length Christmas album, entitled It's Christmas, debuting at number 37 on the Top Christian Albums chart, and at number 44 on the Top Holiday Albums. In 2009, she released her third full-length studio album entitled Freedom. In 2011 she released her fourth studio album, What If We Were Real, followed in 2013 by Overcomer, her most successful album to date, reaching number 29 on the Billboard 200 album chart. In 2017, Out of the Dark was released, becoming her third album to top the Top Christian Albums chart.

== Studio albums ==
List of albums, with selected chart positions and sales
Title	Album details	Peak chart positions		Sales
Title	Album details	US	US Christ.	Sales
True Beauty	Released: July 31, 2007; Label: Sparrow Records	43	1	US: 226,000
It's Christmas	Released: October 14, 2008; Label: Sparrow	85	37	US: 64,000
Freedom	Released: March 24, 2009; Label: Sparrow	83	4	US: 152,000
What If We Were Real	Released: April 5, 2011; Label: Sparrow	66	2	US: 269,000
Overcomer	Released: August 27, 2013; Label: Sparrow	29	1	US: 320,000
Out of the Dark	Released: May 19, 2017; Label: Sparrow	60	1	

== Compilation albums ==
List of compilation albums
Title	Album details	Peak chart positions
Title	Album details	US Christ.
Overcomer: The Greatest Hits	Released: February 7, 2020; Label: Sparrow	39

== Remix albums ==
List of remix albums, with selected chart positions
Title	Album details	Peak chart positions	
Title	Album details	US Christ.	US Dance
Get Up: The Remixes	Released: September 16, 2014; Label: Sparrow	22	6

== EPs ==
List of EPs, with selected chart positions and sales
Title	Details	Peak chart positions		Sales
Title	Details	US Christ.	US Dance	Sales
Christmas Joy (EP)	Released: November 20, 2007; Label: Sparrow	—	—	US: 3,000
Remixed: Get Movin'	Released: August 14, 2012; Label: Sparrow	38	24	US: 1,000
"—" denotes a recording that did not chart or was not released in that territory.

== Singles ==
=== As lead artist ===
List of singles, with selected chart positions and certifications
Title	Year	Chart peak positions					Certifications	Album
Title	Year	US Bub.	US Christ.	US Christ. Airplay	US Christ. AC	UK Cross	Certifications	Album
"Only the World"	2007	—	7		6	—		True Beauty
"God Speaking"	2007	—	26		18	—		True Beauty
"Christmas Makes Me Cry" (featuring Matthew West)	2007	—	3		2	—		It's Christmas
"Voice of a Savior"	2008	—	—		12	—		True Beauty
"Angels We Have Heard on High"	2008	—	—		29	—		It's Christmas
"My Deliverer"	2009	—	9		8	—		Freedom
"He Is with You"	2009	—	21		12	—		Freedom
"Stronger"	2011	25	1		1	—	RIAA: Gold	What If We Were Real
"Waiting for Tomorrow"	2011	—	3		5	—		What If We Were Real
"Good Morning" (featuring tobyMac)	2012	—	18		22	—	RIAA: Gold	What If We Were Real
"It's Christmas"	2012	—	2		2	—		It's Christmas
"Jesus, Firm Foundation" (with Mike Donehey, Steven Curtis Chapman, & Mark Hall)	2013	—	41		—	—		non-album single
"Overcomer"	2013	3	1		1	2	RIAA: Platinum	Overcomer
"Back to You"	2014	—	12	7	10	—		Overcomer
"Press On"	2015	—	43	27	—	—		Overcomer
"Unfinished"	2017	—	8	4	6	—		Out of the Dark
"I'm Still Here"	2017	—	39	—	—	—		Out of the Dark
"Bleed the Same" (featuring tobyMac and Kirk Franklin)	2017	—	10	9	10	—		Out of the Dark
"Good News"	2018	—	19	15	15	—		Out of the Dark
"Way Maker"	2020	—	32	33	—	—		Overcomer: The Greatest Hits
"You Keep Hope Alive" (featuring Jon Reddick)	2020	—	17	12	13	—		non-album single
"It´s Not Over" (featuring Jasmine Murray & Rita Springer)	2020	—	—	—	—	—		non-album single
"Breakthrough"	2021	—	—	—	—	—		non-album single
"Ruins"	2021	—	—	—	—	—		non-album single
"—" denotes a recording that did not chart or was not released in that territory.

=== As featured artist ===
List of singles, with selected chart positions and certifications
Title	Year	Chart peak positions			Certifications	Album
Title	Year	US Christ.	US Christ. Airplay	US Christ. AC	Certifications	Album
"Christmas Day" (Michael W. Smith featuring Mandisa)	2007	2		2		It's a Wonderful Christmas
"Lose My Soul" (tobyMac featuring Mandisa & Kirk Franklin	2008	2		1	RIAA: Gold	Portable Sounds
"Let It Rain (Is There Anybody)" (Crowder featuring Mandisa)	2019	10	6	6		I Know a Ghost
"Jesus is Coming Back" (remix) (Jordan Feliz featuring Jonathan Traylor and Mandisa)	2021	2	1	1		Say It (Deluxe)

== Other appearances ==
Year	Song	Artist	Album
2006	"Dance, Dance, Dance"	Mandisa	Sonic Praise 2: Worship for Life
2007	"Beggar"	Darryl Riden featuring Mandisa	This Fragile Journey
2007	"Redeemer"	Mandisa	Beth Moore Presents: Songs Of Deliverance
2007	"The Right Thing"	Mandisa	The Pirates Who Don't Do Anything
2007	"For Good"	Mandisa	Beth Moore The Patriarches- Encountering the Gospel of Abraham, Isaac, and Jacob
2007	"Broken Into Beautiful"	Mandisa	Women of Faith Compilation It Must Be Grace
2007	"Only the World"	Mandisa	WOW Hits 2008
2008	"Lose My Soul"	tobyMac featuring Mandisa & Kirk Franklin	WOW Hits 2009
2009	"My Deliverer"	Mandisa	WOW Hits 2010
2010	"God Speaking"	Mandisa	WOW Gospel Christmas
2011	"Born For This (Esther)"	Mandisa	Music Inspired by The Story
2011	"Stronger"	Mandisa	WOW Hits 2012
2012	"Good Morning"	Mandisa featuring tobyMac	WOW Hits 2013
2013	"Overcomer"	Mandisa	WOW Hits 2014
2013	"It's Christmas"	Mandisa	WOW Christmas
2014	"Back To You"	Mandisa	WOW Hits 2015
2015	"Press On"	Mandisa	WOW Hits 2016
2017	"Unfinished"	Mandisa	WOW Hits 2018
2018	"Bleed The Same"	Mandisa featuring tobyMac & Kirk Franklin	WOW Hits 2019

== Music videos ==
Freedom (2009)

- "He Is With You" - 3:56

What If We Were Real (2011)

- "Stronger" - 3:44

Overcomer (2013)

- "Overcomer" - 3:49
