= American Idol contestants discography =

This is a comprehensive listing of official post-Idol releases by various contestants of the television show American Idol.

All of the compilations and singles of the show as well as most of its contestants' singles and albums were released by 19 Recordings with Sony Music Entertainment (the general record company associated and affiliated with the Idol series in most countries through its RCA/Jive Label Group) from 2002–2010 and with Universal Music Group (through its Interscope-Geffen-A&M Label Group) from 2011 onwards.

The first winner Kelly Clarkson remains the best-selling contestant worldwide with 25 million albums sold followed by fourth winner Carrie Underwood (best-selling contestant in the United States) with 15 million albums sold worldwide.

By the end of 2009, contestants had a total of 257 number one singles in the Billboard charts and have sold over 66 million albums worldwide and 56 million singles in US alone

== Season 1 ==
- American Idol: Greatest Moments

=== Kelly Clarkson ===
- "Before Your Love" / "A Moment Like This"
- Thankful
  - "Miss Independent"
  - "Low"
  - "The Trouble with Love Is"
- Breakaway
  - "Breakaway"
  - "Since U Been Gone"
  - "Behind These Hazel Eyes"
  - "Because of You"
  - "Walk Away"
- My December
  - "Never Again"
  - "Sober"
  - "One Minute"
  - "Don't Waste Your Time"
- "Up to the Mountain"
- "Because of You" (with Reba McEntire)
- All I Ever Wanted
  - "My Life Would Suck Without You"
  - "I Do Not Hook Up"
  - "Already Gone"
  - "All I Ever Wanted"
- "Don't You Wanna Stay" (with Jason Aldean)”
- Stronger
  - "Mr. Know It All
  - "Stronger (What Doesn't Kill You)"
  - "Dark Side"
- "I'll Be Home for Christmas"
- Greatest Hits: Chapter One
  - "Catch My Breath"
  - "Don't Rush" (with Vince Gill)
  - "People Like Us"
- "Tie It Up"
- Wrapped in Red
  - "Underneath the Tree"
  - "Wrapped in Red"
- "PrizeFighter" (with Trisha Yearwood)
- Piece by Piece
  - "Heartbeat Song"
  - "Invincible"
  - "Piece by Piece"
- "Second Hand Heart " (w/Ben Haenow)
- "Softly and Tenderly" (w/Reba McEntire and Trisha Yearwood)
- "This Is For My Girls" (w/other artists)
- Meaning of Life
  - "Love So Soft" / "Move You"
  - "I Don't Think About You"
  - "Heat"
- "Christmas Eve"
- "Broken & Beautiful"
- "I Dream in Southern" (w/Kaleb Lee)
- "I Would've Loved You" (w/Jake Hoot)
- "I Dare You"
- "Under the Mistletoe" (w/Brett Eldredge)
- "All I Want For Christmas Is You"
- When Christmas Comes Around...
  - "Christmas Isn't Canceled (Just You)"
  - "Glow" (w/Chris Stapleton)
  - "Santa, Can't You Hear Me" (w/Ariana Grande)
  - "You For Christmas"
- Kellyoke
- "You're Drunk, Go Home" (w/Kelsea Ballerini & Carly Pearce)
- "Don't Fence Me In" w/Jeff Goldblum and The Mildred Snitzer Orchestra)
- Chemistry
  - "Mine" / "Me"
  - "Favorite Kind of High"
  - "Lighthouse"
- "From the Jump" (w/James Arthur)
- "If I We Were You" (w/Terri Clark)
- "Sweet December" (w/Brett Eldredge)
- DJ Play a Christmas Song" (Remix) (w/Cher)
- "I'm Movin' On" (w/Rascal Flatts)
- "Where Have You Been"

=== Justin Guarini ===
- The Midnight Voices
- Justin Guarini
  - "Unchained Melody"
  - "Sorry"
- Stranger Things Have Happened
- "Did You Know That I Know Your Journey?"
- "Everlasting"
- Revolve (EP)

=== Nikki McKibbin ===
- Unleashed
  - "To Be with You"
  - "The Lie"
  - "Naked Inside"
  - "Save What's Left of Me"
  - "Cry Little Sister"
- "Here to There"
- "Inconsolable"
- "Made it" (Featuring The League)
- Psychotrip (EP) ( with Love Stricken Demise)
  - "Celebrity High"

=== Tamyra Gray ===
- The Dreamer
  - "Raindrops Will Fall"

=== RJ Helton ===
- Real Life
  - "Even If"
  - "My Devotion"

=== Ryan Starr ===
- "My Religion"
- "Love Gone Bad"
- "Stranded"
- "7am"
- "Eyes of a Child"
- "Blue"
- "Broken"

=== AJ Gil ===
- "She's Hot"
- Love Me Later
- Life, Death & Resurrection
  - "I Live"

=== Jim Verraros ===
- Unsaid and Understood
- Rollercoaster
  - "You Turn It On"
  - "I Want You"
  - "You're Getting Crazy"
  - "Outside"
  - "Welcome to Hollywood"
- Do Not Disturb
  - "Touch (Don't U Want 2)"
  - "Electric Love"
  - "Do Not Disturb"

== Season 2 ==
- American Idol Season 2: All-Time Classic American Love Songs
  - "God Bless the USA"
  - "What the World Needs Now"

=== Ruben Studdard ===
- "Flying Without Wings" / "Superstar"
- Soulful
  - "Sorry 2004"
  - "What If"
- I Need an Angel
  - "I Need an Angel"
- The Return
  - "Change Me"
  - "Make Ya Feel Beautiful"
- "Celebrate Me Home"
- Love Is
  - "Together"
  - "Don't Make 'Em Like U No More"
- Playlist: The Very Best of Ruben Studdard
- Letters from Birmingham
  - "June 28th (I'm Single)"

=== Clay Aiken ===
- "Bridge over Troubled Water" / "This Is the Night"
- Measure of a Man
  - "Invisible"
  - "The Way" / "Solitaire"
  - "I Will Carry You"
  - "Measure of a Man"
- Merry Christmas with Love
  - "Winter Wonderland"
  - "O Holy Night"
  - "Hark the Herald Angels Sing / O Come All Ye Faithful"
  - "Have Yourself a Merry Little Christmas"
  - "Mary, Did You Know?"
- A Thousand Different Ways
  - "Without You"
  - "A Thousand Days"
- All Is Well: Songs for Christmas (EP)
- On My Way Here
  - "On My Way Here"
- The Very Best of Clay Aiken
- Tried and True

=== Kimberley Locke ===
- One Love
  - "8th World Wonder"
  - "Wrong"
  - "Coulda Been"
  - "I Could"
- Based on a True Story
  - "Change"
  - "Band of Gold"
  - "Fall"
- Christmas
  - "Up on the House Top"
  - "Jingle Bells"
  - "Frosty the Snowman"
  - "We Need a Little Christmas"
- "Strobelight"
- Four for the Floor
  - "Finally Free"

=== Josh Gracin ===
- Josh Gracin
  - "I Want to Live"
  - "Nothin' to Lose"
  - "Stay with Me (Brass Bed)"
- We Weren't Crazy
  - "Favorite State of Mind"
  - "I Keep Coming Back"
  - "We Weren't Crazy"
  - "Unbelievable (Ann Marie)"
  - "Telluride"
- Redemption
  - "Enough"
  - "She's a Different Kind of Crazy"
  - "Over Me"
  - "Cover Girl"
  - "Long Way to Go"

=== Carmen Rasmusen ===
- Carmen (EP)
  - "Photograph"
- Nothin' Like the Summer
  - "Nothin' Like the Summer"

=== Kimberly Caldwell ===
- "Who Will You Run To"
- "Fear of Flying"
- Without Regret
  - "Mess of You"
  - "Desperate Girls & Stupid Boys"
- "On the Weekend"
- "Tied Together"
- "Doin' Me Right"

=== Corey Clark ===
- Corey Clark

=== Charles Grigsby ===
- Charles Grigsby (EP)

=== Vanessa Olivarez ===
- "The One"
- The One (The Remixes)
- "As Vain As You"
- Butterfly Stitch EP
- Butterfly Stitch – Live at The Loft

== Season 3 ==
- American Idol Season 3: Greatest Soul Classics

=== Fantasia Barrino ===
- "I Believe"
- Free Yourself
  - "Truth Is"
  - "Baby Mama"
  - "Free Yourself"
  - "Ain't Gon' Beg You"
- Fantasia
  - "Hood Boy"
  - "When I See U"
  - "Only One U"
- Back to Me
  - "Even Angels"
  - "Bittersweet"
- Side Effects of You
  - "Lose to Win"
  - "Without Me"
  - "Side Effects of You"
- The Definition Of...
  - "No Time for It"
  - "Sleeping with the One I Love"
  - "When I Met You"
- Christmas After Midnight
- Sketchbook
  - "Enough"
  - "PTSD"

=== Diana DeGarmo ===
- "Dreams"
- Blue Skies
  - "Emotional"

=== Jasmine Trias ===
- "Love 'Ko To"
- Jasmine Trias
  - "Excuses"
  - "Lose Control"
  - "Sana Lagi"
  - "Kung Paano"
  - "I'd Rather"
- "The Christmas Song"

=== LaToya London ===
- Love & Life
  - "Appreciate" / "Every Part of Me" / "All By Myself"
  - "State of My Heart"

=== George Huff ===
- My Christmas EP (EP)
  - "Go Tell It on the Mountain"
- Miracles
  - "Brighter Day"
  - "Miracles"
  - "You Know Me"
- George Huff
  - "Don't Let Go"

=== John Stevens ===
- Red
  - "Come Fly with Me"

=== Jennifer Hudson ===
- "And I Am Telling You I'm Not Going"
- Jennifer Hudson
  - "Spotlight"
  - "The Star-Spangled Banner"
  - "If This Isn't Love"
  - "Giving Myself"
- I Remember Me
  - "Where You At"
  - "I Remember Me"
  - "No One Gonna Love You"
  - "I Got This"
- "Think Like a Man" (with Ne-Yo feat. Rick Ross)
- JHUD
  - "I Can't Describe (The Way I Feel)"
  - "Walk It Out"
  - "It's Your World"
  - "I Still Love You"
- "Ain't No Mountain High Enough"
- Respect
  - "Here I Am (Singing My Way Home)"
- "Christmas (Baby Please Come Home)"
- The Gift of Love

=== Jon Peter Lewis ===
- "Turn to Grey"
- Stories from Hollywood
  - "Stories from Hollywood"
- "It's Christmas"
- "If I Go Away/Man Like Me"
- Break the Silence
- Jon Peter Lewis (EP)
  - "Crazy Love"

=== Camile Velasco ===
- "Hangin On"
- "Guava Jelly" (feat. Stephen Marley)
- Koy
  - "Super Star"

=== Leah LaBelle ===
- "Sexify"
- "Lolita"
- "What Do We Got To Lose?"
- Love to the Moon (EP)

=== Lisa Leushner ===
- Sing Me Home
- Reality

=== William Hung ===
- Inspiration
- Hung for the Holidays
- Miracle: Happy Summer from William Hung

== Season 4 ==
- American Idol Season 4: The Showstoppers

=== Carrie Underwood ===
- "Inside Your Heaven" / "Independence Day"
- Some Hearts
  - "Jesus, Take the Wheel"
  - "Some Hearts"
  - "Don't Forget to Remember Me"
  - "Before He Cheats"
  - "Wasted"
- "I'll Stand by You"
- Carnival Ride
  - "So Small"
  - "All-American Girl"
  - "Last Name"
  - "Just a Dream"
  - "I Told You So"
- "Praying for Time"
- "Just Stand Up!" (with Various Artists)
- "Home Sweet Home"
- Play On
  - "Cowboy Casanova"
  - "Temporary Home"
  - "Undo It"
  - "Mama's Song"
- "Remind Me" (with Brad Paisley)
- Blown Away
  - "Good Girl"
  - "Blown Away"
  - "Two Black Cadillacs"
  - "See You Again"
- "Somethin' Bad" (with Miranda Lambert)
- Greatest Hits: Decade Number 1
  - "Something in the Water"
  - "Little Toy Guns"
- Storyteller
  - "Smoke Break"
  - "Heartbeat"
  - "Chaser"
  - "Church Bells"
  - "Dirty Laundry"
- "Forever Country" (Artists of Then, Now and Forever)
- "The Fighter" (with Keith Urban)
- "The Champion" (with Ludacris)
- Cry Pretty
  - "Cry Pretty"
  - "Love Wins"
  - "Southbound"
  - "Drinking Alone"
- My Gift
  - "Hallelujah" (with John Legend)
- "Tears of Gold" (with David Bisbal)
- My Savior
- "I Wanna Remember" (with Needtobreathe)
- "If I Didn't Love You" (with Jason Aldean)
- "Only Us" (with Dan + Shay)
- "Stretchy Pants"
- Denim & Rhinestones
  - "Ghost Story"
  - "Hate My Heart"
  - "Out of That Truck"
- "I'm Gonna Love You" {with Cody Johnson)
- "Leave a Light On (Talk Away the Dark)" (with Papa Roach)

"

=== Bo Bice ===
- "I Don't Want to Be"
- "Inside Your Heaven" / "Vehicle"
- The Real Thing
  - "The Real Thing"
  - "U Make Me Better"
- "Blades of Glory"
- See the Light
  - "Witness"
- 3
  - "You Take Yourself with You"

=== Vonzell Solomon ===
- My Struggle

=== Constantine Maroulis ===
- Constantine

=== Nadia Turner ===
- "Standing on Love"

=== Nikko Smith ===
- Revolution

=== Jessica Sierra ===
- Deepest Secret EP

=== Other ===
Mario Vazquez

- Mario Vazquez
  - "Gallery"

== Season 5 ==
- American Idol Season 5: Encores

=== Taylor Hicks ===
- "Do I Make You Proud" / "Takin' It to the Streets"
- Taylor Hicks
  - "Just to Feel That Way"
  - "Heaven Knows"
- The Distance
  - "What's Right Is Right"
  - "Seven Mile Breakdown"

=== Katharine McPhee ===
- "Think"
- "Somewhere Over the Rainbow" / "My Destiny"
- Katharine McPhee
  - "Over It"
  - "Love Story"
- Unbroken
  - "Had It All"
- Christmas Is the Time to Say I Love You
  - "Have Yourself a Merry Little Christmas"
- Hysteria
  - "Lick My Lips"
- I Fall in Love Too Easily
  - "Night and Day"
- Christmas Songs (with David Foster)
  - "Jingle Bell Rock"
  - "Carol of the Bells"

=== Elliott Yamin ===
- "Moody's Mood for Love"
- "This Christmas"
- Elliott Yamin
  - "Movin' On"
  - "Wait for You"
  - "One Word (Elliott Yamin song)"
  - "Home"
  - "In Love With You Forever"
- Sounds of the Season: The Elliott Yamin Holiday Collection
  - "Warm Me Up"
- My Kind of Holiday
- Fight for Love
  - "Fight for Love
  - "You Say"
  - "Can't Keep on Loving You (From a Distance)"

=== Chris Daughtry with Daughtry ===
- "Wanted Dead or Alive (Bon Jovi song)"
- Daughtry
  - "It's Not Over"
  - "Home"
  - "What I Want"
  - "Over You"
  - "Crashed"
  - "Feels Like Tonight"
  - "What About Now"
- "By the Way" (with Theory of a Deadman)
- "Long Way Down" (with Timbaland)
- "By the Way" (with Theory of a Deadman)
- "Had Enough" (with Lifehouse
- Leave This Town
  - "No Surprise"
  - "You Don't Belong"
  - "Life After You"
  - "September"
- "Waitin' for the Bus / Jesus Just Left Chicago" (with Various artists)
- Break the Spell
  - "Renegade"
  - "Crawling Back to You"
  - "Outta My Head"
  - "Start of Something Good"
- Baptized
  - "Waiting for Superman"
  - "Long Live Rock 'n Roll"
  - "Battleships"
- It's Not Over...The Hits So Far
  - "Torches"
- Cage to Rattle
  - "Deep End"
  - "As You Are"
- Dearly Beloved
  - "World on Fire"
  - "Heavy Is the Crown"
  - "Changes Are Coming"
- "Separate Ways (Worlds Apart)" (with Lzzy Hale)
- "Artificial"

=== Paris Bennett ===
- "Midnight Train to Georgia"
- Princess P
  - "Ordinary Love"
  - "Duet"
  - "My Boyfriend's Back" (Promo only)

=== Kellie Pickler ===
- Small Town Girl
  - "Red High Heels"
  - "I Wonder"
  - "Things That Never Cross a Man's Mind"
- Kellie Pickler
  - "Don't You Know You're Beautiful"
  - "Best Days of Your Life"
  - "Didn't You Know How Much I Loved You"
  - "Makin' Me Fall in Love Again"
- 100 Proof
  - "Tough"
  - "100 Proof"
- The Woman I Am
  - "Someone Somewhere Tonight"
  - "Little Bit Gypsy"
  - "Closer to Nowhere"
- "The Man with the Bag"
- "Feeling Tonight"
- "If It Wasn't for a Woman"

=== Ace Young ===
- "Father Figure"
- "Scattered"
- Ace Young
  - "Addicted"

=== Bucky Covington ===
- Bucky Covington
  - "A Different World"
  - "It's Good to Be Us"
  - "I'll Walk"
- I'm Alright
  - "I Want My Life Back"
  - "Gotta Be Somebody"
  - "A Father's Love (The Only Way He Knew How)"
- TBD Album
  - "I Wanna Be That Feeling"

=== Mandisa ===
- True Beauty
  - "Only the World"
  - "God Speaking"
  - "Voice of a Savior"
- Christmas Joy EP
  - "Christmas Makes Me Cry"
- It's Christmas
  - "Christmas Day"
  - "Angels We Have Heard on High"
- "Lose My Soul"
- Freedom
  - "My Deliverer"
  - "He Is with You"
- What If We Were Real
  - "Stronger"
  - "Good Morning"

=== Others ===
Ayla Brown

- Forward
- Ayla Brown
- Let Love In

Brianna Taylor

- Brianna Taylor (EP)
- Fireworks at the Fairground

== Season 6 ==
- American Idol Season 6: Greatest Hits

=== Jordin Sparks ===
- Jordin Sparks (EP)
  - "This Is My Now"
- Jordin Sparks
  - "Tattoo"
  - "No Air" (w/ Chris Brown)
  - "One Step at a Time"
- Battlefield
  - "Battlefield"
  - "S.O.S (Let the Music Play)"
  - ""Don't Let It Go to Your Head""
- "Art of Love" (w/Guy Sebastian)
- "I Am Woman"
- "Is This Love" (w/Alex Gaudino)
- Sparkle
  - "Celebrate" (w/Whitney Houston)
- "Skipping a Beat"
- ByeFelicia (Mixtape)
  - "It Ain't You"
- Right Here Right Now
  - "Double Tap" (ft. 2 Chainz)
  - "Right Here Right Now"
  - "They Don't Give"
- 1990 Forever (EP) (w/Elijah Blake)
  - "Real Love"
- Sounds Like Me (EP)
  - "Unknown"
  - "Red Sangria"
- "Pink" (w/Dolly Parton, Monica, Rita Wilson, & Sara Evans)
  - "Homebody"
- Cider & Hennessy
  - "A Baby Changes Everything"
- "You Still Think of Me"
- "Love Me Like I Am" (w/ For King & Country)
- "What Are We Fighting For" (w/Th3rdstream)
- "Stop This Feeling"
- "DNA" (w/Maurice Moore)
- "Stadiums"
- "Deaux" (w/Elijah Blake)
- The Gift of Christmas (EP)
- No Restrictions
  - "Call My Name"
  - "Remember"
  - "More Than Enough"

=== Blake Lewis ===
- Blake Lewis (EP)
  - "You Give Love a Bad Name"
- A.D.D. (Audio Day Dream)
  - "Break Anotha"
  - "How Many Words"
- Heartbreak on Vinyl
  - "Sad Song"
  - "Heartbreak on Vinyl"
  - "Till' We See the Sun"
- Portrait of a Chameleon
  - "Your Touch"

=== Melinda Doolittle ===
- Melinda Doolittle (EP)
  - "My Funny Valentine"
- "It's Your Love"
- Coming Back to You

=== LaKisha Jones ===
- LaKisha Jones (EP)
- So Glad I'm Me
  - "Let's Go Celebrate"

=== Chris Richardson ===
- Chris Richardson (EP)
- Come Right Back to You
  - "All Alone"
- "Far Away" (as featured artist)

=== Phil Stacey ===
- Phil Stacey (EP)
- Phil Stacey
  - "If You Didn't Love Me"
- Into the Light
  - "Old Glory"
  - "Inside Out"
  - "You're Not Shaken"
  - "Some Kind of Love"

=== Sanjaya Malakar ===
- Dancing to the Music in My Head

=== Haley Scarnato ===
- StrongHeart
  - "Girls Night Out"

=== Gina Glocksen ===
- Gina Glocksen – EP

=== Chris Sligh ===
- Running Back to You
  - "Empty Me"
  - "Arise"

=== Stephanie Edwards ===
- "On Our Way"
- "Here I Am"

=== Brandon Rogers ===
- Automatic

=== Others ===
Sarah Burgess

- One
  - "Dangerouz"
  - "I'm So Crushed"
- Didn't Matter That

Sean Michel

- The Thrill of Hope

== Season 7 ==
=== David Cook ===
- "I Still Haven't Found What I'm Looking For"
- "The World I Know"
- "I Don't Want to Miss a Thing"
- "Billie Jean"
- "Always Be My Baby"
- "Hello"
- "The Music of the Night"
- "Eleanor Rigby"
- "I'm Alive"
- "Little Sparrow"
- "Hungry Like the Wolf"
- "Innocent"
- "Day Tripper"
- "All Right Now"
- "Happy Together"
- "Dream Big"
- David Cook
  - "The Time of My Life"
  - "Light On"
  - "Bar-ba-sol"
  - "Come Back to Me"
  - "Permanent"
- This Loud Morning
  - "The Last Goodbye"
  - "Fade into Me"
- "The Last Song I'll Write for You"
- "Laying Me Low"
- "Wait for Me"
- Digital Vein
  - "Criminals"
  - "Broken Windows"
  - "Heartbeat"
- Chromance'
  - "Gimmie Heartbreak"
- "Death of Me"
- The Looking Glass
  - "Red Turns Blue"
  - "Strange World"
  - "Fire"
- "TABOS"
- "Dead Weight"
- "This Time Tomorrow 16"

=== David Archuleta ===
- "Imagine"
- "Don't Let the Sun Go Down on Me"
- "In This Moment"
- "Longer"
- "Think of Me"
- "Angels"
- David Archuleta
  - "Crush"
  - "A Little Too Not Over You"
  - "Touch My Hand"
- "I Wanna Know You" (with Miley Cyrus)
- Fan Pack (EP)
- Christmas from the Heart
  - "Have Yourself a Merry Little Christmas"
- For the Fans
- "Somos El Mundo"
  (with Various Artists)
- The Other Side of Down
  - "Something 'Bout Love"
  - "Elevator"
  - "Falling Stars"
- Forevermore
  - "Forevermore"
  - "Nandito"
  - "I'll Never Go"
  - "Rainbow" (Remix)
- Glad Christmas Tidings (with Mormon Tabernacle Choir)
- "Drummer Boy" (with Dapo)
- Begin
  - "Broken"
- No Matter How Far
  - "Don't Run Away"
- Orion
- Leo
- "Workin" (with JTM)
- Postcards in the Sky
  - "Numb"
  - "Up All Night"
  - "Invisible"
  - "Seasons" (feat. Madilyn Paige)
  - "Postcards in the Sky"
- Winter in the Air
  - "Christmas Every Day"
- "Anymore" (with Madilyn Paige)
- Therapy Sessions
  - "Paralyzed"
  - "Ok, All Right"
  - "Switch"
- "Losin' Sleep"
- "Movin'"
- "Beast"
- "What a Beautiful Name" (with BYU Vocal Point)
- "Faith in Me"
- "Up"
- "I'm Yours"
- Afraid to Love"
- "Hell Together"

=== Jason Castro ===
- "Hallelujah"
- "Over the Rainbow"
- "White Christmas"
- The Love Uncompromised EP (EP)
  - "Let's Just Fall in Love Again"
- Jason Castro
  - "That's What I'm Here For"
  - "Over the Rainbow"
- Who I Am
  - "You Are"
- Only a Mountain

=== Brooke White ===
- High Hopes and Heart Break
  - "Hold Up My Heart"
  - "Radio Radio"
- Gemini EP (as part of Jack and White)
- Winter EP (as part of Jack and White)
- Undercover EP (as part of Jack and White)
- White Christmas
- Banner 4 July EP
- Never Grow Up: Lullabies and Happy Songs
- Lost EP (as part of Jack and White)}
- Calico

=== Carly Smithson with We Are the Fallen ===
- Tear the World Down
  - "Bury Me Alive"

=== Kristy Lee Cook ===
- Why Wait
  - "15 Minutes of Shame"
- "Airborne Ranger Infantry"
- "Wherever Loves Go" (with Randy Houser)
- "Lookin' for a Cowgirl"
- All Kinds of Crazy

=== Michael Johns ===
- Hold Back My Heart
  - "Heart on My Sleeve"

=== Ramiele Malubay ===
- "We Are One (This Christmas)"
- "Kaya"
- "More to Me"
- "Here I Am"

=== Amanda Overmyer ===
- Solidify
  - "Play On"
  - "Love Me Like You Want"

=== Dani Noriega (as Adore Delano) ===
- "24/7"
- Till Death Do Us Party
  - "D T F"
  - "I Adore U"
  - "Party"
  - "Hello, I Love You"
  - "I Look Fuckin' Cool"
  - "My Address is Hollywood"
  - "Jump the Gun"
  - "Give Me Tonight"
- "Superstar"
- "Oh No She Betta Don't"
- After Party
  - "Dynamite"
  - "Take Me There"
  - "I.C.U."
- "The T"
- Whatever
  - "Negative Nancy"
  - "Whole 9 Yards"
  - "27 Club"
- Dirty Laundry (EP)

== Season 8 ==
=== Kris Allen ===
- Season 8 Favorite Performances
  - "Heartless"
  - "Ain't No Sunshine"
  - "Apologize"
  - "Falling Slowly"
  - "What's Going On"
  - "Make You Feel My Love"
  - "No Boundaries"
- "Let It Be"
- Kris Allen
  - "Live Like We're Dying"
  - "The Truth (with Pat Monahan)
  - "Alright with Me"
- Thank You Camellia
  - "The Vision of Love"
- Waiting for Christmas (EP)
- Horizons
  - "Prove It to You" (feat. Lenachka)
- Letting You In
  - "Waves"
  - "Love Will Find You"
- "A Little Bit of Christmas" (with Jim Brickman)
- Acoustic Tapes (EP)
- Somethin' About Christmas
- Letting You In: Acoustic Performances (EP)
- 10 (EP)
- Pole Vaulter

=== Adam Lambert ===
- Season 8 Favorite Performances
  - "Mad World"
  - "A Change Is Gonna Come"
  - "One"
  - "Cryin'"
  - "Slow Ride" (with Allison Iraheta)
  - "The Tracks of My Tears"
  - "Feeling Good"
- "No Boundaries"
- Take One
- For Your Entertainment
  - "For Your Entertainment"
  - "Whataya Want from Me"
  - "Time for Miracles"
  - "If I Had You"
- Trespassing
  - "Better Than I Know Myself"
  - "Never Close Our Eyes"

=== Danny Gokey ===
- Non-album song
  - "You Are So Beautiful"
- My Best Days
  - "My Best Days Are Ahead of Me"
  - "I Will Not Say Goodbye"
- Non-album song
  - "Second Hand Heart"

=== Allison Iraheta ===
- "Slow Ride" (with Adam Lambert)
- Just like You
  - "Friday I'll Be Over U"
  - "Scars"
  - "Don't Waste the Pretty"

=== Anoop Desai ===
- All Is Fair
  - "My Name"
- Zero.0

=== Scott MacIntyre ===
- Heartstrings

=== Michael Sarver ===
- Michael Sarver
  - "You Are"
  - "Cinderella Girl"
  - "Ferris Wheel"
- Christmas

== Season 9 ==
- American Idol Season 9

=== Lee DeWyze ===
- "Beautiful Day"
- "Hallelujah"
- "Falling Slowly" (with Crystal Bowersox)
- "The Boxer"
- "Everybody Hurts"
- Live It Up
  - "Sweet Serendipity"
  - "Beautiful Like You"
- Frames
  - "Silver Lining"
  - "Fight"

=== Crystal Bowersox ===
- "Up to the Mountain"
- "Falling Slowly" (with Lee DeWyze)
- "Black Velvet"
- "Me and Bobby McGee"
- Farmer's Daughter
  - "Farmer's Daughter"
  - "Ridin' with the Radio"

=== Casey James ===
- "Let's Don't Call It a Night"
- "Crying on a Suitcase"

=== Aaron Kelly ===
- "I Can't Wait for Christmas"

=== Tim Urban ===
- Heart of Me
  - "Heart of Me"

=== Siobhan Magnus ===
- Moonbaby
  - "Beatrice Dream"
  - "Black Doll"

=== Andrew Garcia ===
- "Crazy"

=== Todrick Hall ===
- Somebody's Christmas
- MTV's Todrick: The Music, Vol. 1
- Straight Outta Oz
  - "Low"
- Forbidden
- Haus Party, Pt. 1
  - "Glitter"
  - "Nails, Hair, Hips, Heels"
  - "I Like Boys"
- Haus Party, Pt. 2
  - "Nails, Hair, Hips, Heels"
  - "Wig"
  - "Fag"
  - "Dripeesha"
  - "Y.A.S."
- Quarantine Queen
  - "Mask, Gloves, Soap, Scrubs"
- Haus Party, Pt. 3
  - "Blue"
  - "Pink Dreams"
- Femuline
  - "Boys in the Ocean"
  - "Rainin' Fellas"

=== Tori Kelly ===
- Handmade Songs
  - "Confetti"
- Foreword
  - "Dear No One"
- Unbreakable Smile
  - "Nobody Love"
  - "Should've Been Us"
- Hiding Place
  - "Help Us to Love"
  - "Never Alone"
  - "Psalm 42"
- Inspired by True Events
  - "Change Your Mind"
  - "Sorry Would Go A Long Way"
  - "Language"
- Solitude
  - "Time Flies"
  - "Unbothered"
- A Tori Kelly Christmas
  - "Let It Snow"
  - "25th"

== Season 10 ==
=== Scotty McCreery ===
- American Idol Season 10: Scotty McCreery
- American Idol Season 10 Highlights: Scotty McCreery EP
- Clear as Day
  - "I Love You This Big"
  - "The Trouble with Girls"
  - "Water Tower Town"
- Christmas with Scotty McCreery
- See You Tonight
  - "See You Tonight"
  - "Feelin' It"
- Seasons Change
  - "Five More Minutes"
  - "This Is It"
  - "In Between"
- Same Truck
  - "You Time"
  - "Damn Straight"
  - "It Matters to Her"
- "Cab in a Solo"

=== Lauren Alaina ===
- American Idol Season 10: Lauren Alaina
- American Idol Season 10 Highlights: Lauren Alaina EP
- Wildflower
  - "Like My Mother Does"
  - "Georgia Peaches"
  - "Eighteen Inches"
- "Barefoot and Buckwild"
- Road Less Traveled
  - "Next Boyfriend"
  - "Road Less Traveled"
  - "Doin' Fine"
- Sitting Pretty on Top of the World
  - "Getting Good"
  - "Getting Over Him"

=== Haley Reinhart ===
- American Idol Season 10 Highlights: Haley Reinhart EP
- "Baby, It's Cold Outside" (with Casey Abrams)
- Listen Up!
  - "Free"

=== James Durbin ===
- American Idol Season 10 Highlights: James Durbin EP
- Memories of a Beautiful Disaster
  - "Stand Up"
  - "Love Me Bad"
  - "Higher Than Heaven

=== Casey Abrams ===
- Casey Abrams
  - "Get Out"
  - "Simple Life"

=== Stefano Langone (as Stefano) ===
- "I'm on a Roll"
- "Yes to Love"

=== Pia Toscano ===
- "This Time"

=== Thia Megia ===
- "One Day"

=== Naima Adedapo ===
- Untitled EP
  - 'Free Your Mind"

=== Ashthon Jones ===
- "Lookout"

=== Chris Medina ===
- What Are Words
  - "What Are Words"

== Season 11 ==
=== Phillip Phillips ===
- Phillip Phillips: Journey to the Finale
- American Idol Season 11 Highlights
- The World from the Side of the Moon
  - "Home"
  - "Gone, Gone, Gone"
- Behind the Light
  - "Raging Fire"
  - "Unpack Your Heart"
- Collateral
  - "Miles"
  - "Into the Wild"
- "Bring It On Home" (with American Authors and Maddie Poppe)
- "Hold on to Your Love" (with Walk off the Earth)
- Drift Back
  - "Dancing with Your Shadows
  - "Love Like That"

=== Jessica Sanchez ===
- "Change Nothing"
- Jessica Sanchez: Journey to the Finale
- American Idol Season 11 Highlights
- Me, You & the Music
  - "Tonight"

=== Joshua Ledet ===
- American Idol Season 11 Highlights

=== Hollie Cavanagh ===
- American Idol Season 11 Highlights
- "Outer Limit"

=== Skylar Laine ===
- American Idol Season 11 Highlights
- "Settle Down"

=== Elise Testone ===
- In This Life
  - "I Will Not Break"

=== Colton Dixon ===
- A Messenger
  - "Never Gone"
  - "You Are"
- Anchor
  - "More of You"
  - "Through All of It"
  - "Limitless"
- The Calm Before the Storm
- Identity
  - "All That Matters"
- Colton Dixon (EP)
  - "Miracles
- "Let It Snow"
- "Made to Fly"
- Canvas
  - "Build a Boat"

=== DeAndre Brackensick ===
- "Her Crazy"

=== Heejun Han (as HeeJun) ===
- "Bring the Love Back"

=== Erika Van Pelt ===
- My Independence
  - "Listen, Learn, Then Delete"

== Season 12 ==
=== Candice Glover ===
- Music Speaks
  - "I Am Beautiful"
  - "Cried"

=== Kree Harrison ===
- "All Cried Out"

=== Angie Miller ===
- "You Set Me Free
- "This Christmas Song"
- Weathered

=== Janelle Arthur ===
- "What You Asked For"

=== Paul Jolley ===
- "Healed"

== Season 13 ==
=== Caleb Johnson ===
- Testify
  - "As Long as You Love Me"
  - "Only One"
  - "Fighting Gravity"
- Born from Southern Ground (credited as Caleb Johnson & the Ramblin' Saints)
  - "Holding On"
  - "Hanging with the Band"

=== Jena Irene Asciutto ===
- "We Are One" (credited as Jena Irene)
- "Unbreakable"
- Innocence (EP)
  - "Innocence"
  - "You Gotta Help Me"
- Cold Fame

=== Alex Preston ===
- "The Light Was Already Here"
- Alex Preston
- A Work in Progress

=== Jessica Meuse ===
- "Done"
- "Rio Grande"
- Halfhearted

=== Sam Woolf ===
- Pretend

=== CJ Harris ===
- "In Love"

=== Dexter Roberts ===
- Dream About Me
  - "Dream About Me"
- Dexter Roberts Unplugged, Vol. 1

=== Majesty Rose ===
- Bloom
- "Plunge"
- "People Hold On"

=== MK Nobilette ===
- "Make Believe"

=== Ben Briley ===
- Outlier

=== Emily Piriz ===
- "One of Those Nights"

=== Queen Burns as Queen Naija ===
- "Medicine"
- "Karma"
- Queen Naija EP
  - "Butterflies"
  - "War Cry"
- "Away From You"
- "Good Morning Text"
- Missunderstood
  - "Butterflies Pt. 2"
  - "Pack Lite"
  - "Lie to Me"
  - "Set Him Up"

=== Remi Wolf ===
- You're a Dog
  - "Guy"
  - "Sauce"
  - "Shawty"
- I'm Allergic to Dogs!
  - "Woo!"
  - "Photo ID"
  - "Disco Man"
  - "Hello Hello Hello"
- Juno
  - "Liquor Store"
  - "Quiet on Set"
  - "Grumpy Old Man"
  - "Guerrilla"
  - "Sexy Villain"
  - "Anthony Kiedis"
  - "Front Tooth"
- Big Ideas
  - "Cinderella"
  - "Toro"
  - "Alone in Miami"
  - "Motorcycle"
  - "Soup"

== Season 14 ==
=== Nick Fradiani ===
- Hurricane
  - "Beautiful Life"
  - "Get You Home"
  - "All on You"
- Where We Left Off (EP)
  - "I'll Wait for You"
- "Hallelujah" (with Nick Fradiani Sr.)
- "Scared" (acoustic)
- Past My Past

=== Clark Beckham ===
- "Champion"

=== Jax ===
- "Forcefield"
- "La La Land"
- "Like My Father"
- "Victoria's Secret"
- "Cinderella Snapped"
- "Iconic" (with Simple Plan)

=== Rayvon Owen ===
- Cycles (EP)
- "Air"
- "Gold"
- "Space Between" (with Blair St. Clair)

=== Adanna Duru ===
- "Transparent Soul"

=== Sarina-Joi Crowe ===
- "Hold On Me"

== Season 15 ==
=== Trent Harmon ===
- Trent Harmon
  - "Falling"
- You Got 'Em All
  - "There's a Girl"
  - "You Got 'Em All"

=== La'Porsha Renae ===
- "Battles"
- Already All Ready
  - "Good Woman"
  - "Already All Ready"
- "Solo"
- "My Empty"
- "Fallen"
- The Odessy of Love, #I: Battle Bayou
  - "Black Swan"
- The Odessy of Love, #II: Dead Read Sea
- The Odessy of Love, #III: Covenant Cove
- The Odessy of Love, #IV: Sea's Spring

== Season 16 ==
=== Maddie Poppe ===
- "Going, Going, Gone"
- "Keep On Movin' On"
- Whirlwind
  - "First Aid Kit"
  - "Made You Miss"
  - "Not Losing You"
- "One That Got Away"
- "Peace of Mind"
- "Screw You a Little Bit"
- "Good Enough to Let You Go"
- "Bring It On Home" (with American Authors and Phillip Phillips)
- Christmas From Home

=== Caleb Lee Hutchinson ===
- Johnny Cash Heart

=== Gabby Barrett ===
- "River Deep"
- Goldmine
  - "I Hope"
  - "The Good Ones"
  - "Footprints on the Moon"
  - "Pick Me Up"
- Chapter & Verse
  - "Glory Days"

== Season 17 ==
=== Laine Hardy ===
- "Flame"
- Here's to Anyone

== Season 18 ==
=== Just Sam ===
- Africando

== Season 19 ==
=== Chayce Beckham ===
- "23"
- "Can't Do Without Me" (with Lindsay Ell)
- Doin' It Right
  - "Tell Me Twice"
  - "Till the Day I Die"

=== Benson Boone ===
- Fireworks & Rollerblades
  - "Ghost Town"
  - "In the Stars"
  - "Beautiful Things"
  - "Slow It Down"
- American Heart
  - "Sorry I'm Here For Someone Else"
  - "Mystical Magical"

== Season 20 ==
=== Noah Thompson ===
- Middle of God Knows Where
  - "One Day Tonight"

== Season 21 ==
=== Iam Tongi ===
- "I'll Be Seeing You"
- "The Winner Takes It All"
- "Why Kiki?"

== Season 22 ==
=== Abi Carter ===
- "This Isn't Over"
- Ghosts in the Backyard
