= My Deliverer =

Single by Mandisa

from the album Freedom
- Released: January 27, 2009
- Recorded: 2008
- Genre: Gospel, R&B
- Length: 3:15
- Label: Sparrow
- Songwriters: Chad Cates, Jason Walker, Tony Webster Wood

Mandisa singles chronology
"Voice of a Savior" (2008)	"My Deliverer" (2009)	"He Is with You" (2009)

"My Deliverer" is the first single from Mandisa's second album Freedom. It was released on January 27, 2009.

This song was also featured the compilation album WOW Hits 2010.

== Song background ==
The song is about someone who was helpless, and was watching, waiting, praying, staying down on his/her knees waiting for the Lord to rescue him/her. On the chorus the lines "Every moment I will give You praise" is basically giving praise to God every day of your life and thanking Him for every blessing.

== Personnel ==
- Mandisa – lead and backing vocals
- Christopher Stevens – keyboards, programming, backing vocals
- Justin York – guitars
- Bernard Harris – bass
- James Holloway – drums
- Michelle Swift – backing vocals

== Chart performance ==
The song rose up to Christian radio, receiving up to 1,000 spins in the first week of release. It debuted at number twenty on the Billboard Hot Christian Songs and climbed to the number nine position, becoming Mandisa's fifth top 10 hit and her first solo top 10 hit since 2007's "Christmas Day".

It peaked at number eight on the Billboard Hot Christian AC chart, becoming her first top 10 hit on the chart since "Lose My Soul".

== Charts ==
Chart performance for "My Deliverer"
Chart (2009)	Peak position
US Hot Christian Songs (Billboard)	9
US Christian Airplay (Billboard)	9
US Christian AC (Billboard)	8

== Awards ==
In 2010, the song was nominated for a Dove Award for Pop/Contemporary Recorded Song of the Year at the 41st GMA Dove Awards.
