= The Spirit of Christmas (Michael W. Smith album) =

Studio album by Michael W. Smith
- Released: September 30, 2014
- Studios: Ronnie's Place Studio, Blackbird Studio, The House and The Tracking Room (Nashville, Tennessee); Paragon Studios and The Manor (Franklin, Tennessee); Studiowave (Brentwood, Tennessee); emotionmix studios (Spring Hill, Tennessee); Sound Logic (Santa Barbara, California); AIR Studios (Lyndhurst Hall, London, UK)
- Genres: Christmas, CCM, country
- Length: 47:12
- Label: Capitol
- Producers: Robert Deaton; David Hamilton; Michael W. Smith

Michael W. Smith chronology
| Sovereign (2014) | The Spirit of Christmas (2014) | Hymns II (2016) |

The Spirit of Christmas, officially titled as Michael W. Smith & Friends: The Spirit of Christmas is a duet Christmas album by Christian recording artist Michael W. Smith, released on September 30, 2014, through Capitol Records. This is Smith's fourth Christmas album. His previous Christmas album, It's a Wonderful Christmas, was released in 2007. The Spirit of Christmas won 2015 Dove Award for Christmas Album of the Year.

== Background ==
This album features duets with several country music artists, including Carrie Underwood, Lady Antebellum, Little Big Town, Jennifer Nettles of Sugarland, Martina McBride, and Vince Gill. Other artists on it include U2 frontman Bono, Amy Grant, and Michael McDonald. Bono is featured in spoken word on the track "The Darkest Midnight."

== Tour ==
Cracker Barrel sponsored Smith's 2014 "Spirit of Christmas Tour", which started on November 30, 2014, and finished on December 21, 2014. The tour features a full symphony and consists of 14 shows, 3 of which were co-headlined with Amy Grant.

Smith toured this album again in 2015, also with Cracker Barrel sponsoring. This time Amy Grant was featured in 8 of 13 shows. The tour began on December 4, 2015, in Kentucky, and ended on December 20, 2015, in Virginia.

== Critical reception ==
Jeffrey Lee Puckett for The Courier Journal said the album "gets the season of holiday Christmas albums off to a big start."

== Commercial performance ==
The album sold 4,000 copies in its first week of release, debuted at No. 80 on the Billboard 200 and peaked at No. 16 as of December 2014. It also reached No. 13 on Top Album Sales Chart which counts traditional album sales and does not include streaming. On the Top Christian Albums Chart, the album debuted at No. 5 and peaked at No. 1. This marks Smith's third new album for 2014 to enter the Billboard 200. He previously released Sovereign, which debuted at No. 10 on the Billboard 200, selling 16,000 copies; and Hymns, which debuted at No. 25 with 12,000 copies. As of January 2015, The Spirit of Christmas has sold 145,000 copies.

== Track listing ==
| No. | Title | Writer(s) | Length |
|---|---|---|---|
| 1. | "The Miracle of Christmas" | Michael W. Smith | 1:43 |
| 2. | "It's the Most Wonderful Time of the Year" | Edward Pola, George Wyle | 2:38 |
| 3. | "Happy Holiday / Holiday Season" | Irving Berlin, Kay Thompson | 3:06 |
| 4. | "Christmas Time Is Here" (featuring Vince Gill) | Vince Guaraldi, Lee Mendelson | 3:00 |
| 5. | "White Christmas" (featuring Lady Antebellum) | Berlin | 3:49 |
| 6. | "Somewhere in My Memory" (featuring Audrey Smith and the Nashville Children's Choir) | John Williams, Leslie Bricusse | 3:21 |
| 7. | "The Spirit of Christmas" (medley: Deck the Halls/Good King Wenceslas/O Little Town of Bethlehem/Feels Like Christmas/O Come All Ye Faithful) | Traditional; arr. by Smith | 5:21 |
| 8. | "Silent Night" (featuring Little Big Town) | Traditional | 4:18 |
| 9. | "What Child Is This?" (featuring Martina McBride) | Traditional | 4:20 |
| 10. | "Almost There" (featuring Amy Grant) | Smith, Amy Grant, Wes King | 3:38 |
| 11. | "All Is Well" (featuring Carrie Underwood) | Smith, Wayne Kirkpatrick | 3:55 |
| 12. | "Christmas Day" (featuring Jennifer Nettles and the Nashville Children's Choir) | Smith, King, Cindy Morgan | 3:13 |
| 13. | "The Darkest Midnight" (with spoken word by Bono) | Traditional; arr. by Smith | 1:39 |
| 14. | "Peace" (featuring Michael McDonald) | Beth Nielsen Chapman, McDonald | 3:11 |

== Personnel ==
- Michael W. Smith – lead vocals (2–6, 8–12, 14), acoustic piano (6–12, 14), arrangements (6–9), synthesizer (13)
- David Hamilton – orchestra arrangements and conductor (1–3, 5–7, 9–12, 14), synthesizer (1, 9, 12, 13), celeste (1, 6, 7), acoustic piano (2, 3, 5), backing vocals (3), Rhodes electric piano (4), arrangements (4, 5), percussion (9)
- Mark Baldwin – guitars (2, 3, 5, 8, 9, 12)
- Chris Rodriguez – guitars (2, 3, 5, 8–10, 12)
- Tom Hemby – guitars (4)
- Vince Gill – guitar solo (4), lead and harmony vocals (4)
- Craig Nelson – bass (2, 9, 12), upright bass (3–5)
- Scott Williamson – drums (2–5, 9, 12)
- Tyler Smith – percussion programming (9)
- Josephine Knight – cello solo (8)
- Skip Cleavinger – low whistle (13)
- The London Session Orchestra – orchestra (1–3, 5–7, 9–12, 14)
- Thomas Bowes – concertmaster
- Isobel Griffiths – orchestra contractor
- Susie Gillis – orchestra contractor
- Ric Domenico – music preparation
- Ken Johnson – music preparation
- Laura Cooksey – backing vocals (3)
- Stephanie Hall-Wedan – backing vocals (3)
- Mark Ivey – backing vocals (3)
- Dave Haywood – electric guitar and backing vocals (5)
- Charles Kelley – backing vocals (5)
- Hillary Scott – lead and backing vocals (5)
- Audrey Smith – lead vocal (6)
- The Nashville Children's Choir – choir (6, 12), directed by Kyle Hankins
- Karen Fairchild – backing vocals (8)
- Phillip Sweet – backing vocals (8)
- Jimi Westbrook – backing vocals (8)
- Kimberly Schlapman – lead vocals (8)
- Martina McBride – lead vocals (9)
- Becca Hamilton – backing vocals (9)
- Amy Grant – lead vocals (10)
- Carrie Underwood – lead vocals (11)
- Jennifer Nettles – lead vocals (12)
- Bono – spoken word (13)
- Michael McDonald – harmony vocals (14)

Choir on "Almost There"

- Melodie Kirkpatrick – contractor
- Jason Barton, April Duren, Mike Eldred, Rod Fletcher, Shelley Jennings, Tammy Jensen, Shelly Justice, Melodie Kirkpatrick, Jamiee Paul, Michelle Swift, Gary Robinson and David Wise – singers

== Production ==
- Greg Ham – executive producer
- Robert Deaton – executive producer, producer
- Michael W. Smith – executive producer, producer
- David Hamilton – producer, editing, BGV recording (3, 9), vocal recording (MWS vocal on 5, 8, 9, 11, 14), celeste recording (6, 7), low whistle recording (13)
- Rob Burrell – rhythm track recording, editing, mixing, mastering, vocal recording (2–6, 8, 10–14), piano recording (6–8, 14), guitar recording (10), children's choir recording (12)
- Kam Luchterhand – rhythm track recording assistant
- Richard Swor – vocal recording assistant (2–6, 8, 10–14), children's choir recording assistant (12)
- Matt Rausch – recording (Vince Gill's guitar on 4), vocal recording (Amy Grant's vocal on 10)
- Chris Barrett – piano recording (10, 11)
- Brad Pooler – vocal recording assistant (MWS vocal on 5, 8, 9, 11, 14), vocal recording (Audrey Smith's vocal on 6), guitar recording (10)
- Allen Ditto – vocal recording (Martina McBride's vocal on 9)
- David Schober – choir recording (10)
- Mark Casselman – vocal recording (Michael McDonald's vocal on 14)
- Ken Johnson – production manager
- Sarah Sung – art and design
- Cameron Powell – photography
- Christin Cook – grooming
- Tasia Treimer – wardrobe stylist
- The MWS Group – management

== Charts ==
Chart performance for The Spirit of Christmas
| Chart (2014–15) | Peak position |
|---|---|
| US Billboard 200 | 16 |
| US Top Christian Albums (Billboard) | 1 |
| US Digital Albums (Billboard) | 13 |
| US Top Catalog Albums (Billboard) | 41 |
| US Top Holiday Albums (Billboard) | 1 |

Songs
| Year | Song | US peak chart positions | | | | |
| Year | Song | Christian | Christian Airplay | Christian Digital | Christian AC | Christian Soft AC |
|---|---|---|---|---|---|---|
| 2014 | "It's The Most Wonderful Time Of The Year" | 38 | 24 | – | 13 | – |
| 2014 | "Happy Holiday / Holiday Season" | 39 | 22 | – | – | – |
| 2014 | "White Christmas" (featuring Lady Antebellum) | 39 | – | – | – | – |
| 2014 | "Silent Night" (featuring Little Big Town) | 48 | – | – | – | – |
| 2014 | "Almost There" (featuring Amy Grant) | 27 | 35 | – | – | 19 |
| 2014 | "All Is Well" (featuring Carrie Underwood) | 6 | 22 | 3 | 30 | – |
| 2014 | "Christmas Day" (featuring Jennifer Nettles) | 49 | – | – | – | – |
