= Freedom (Mandisa album) =

Studio album by Mandisa
- Released: March 24, 2009
- Recorded: 2008–2009
- Studios: Fabmusic, Dark Horse Recording and Townsend Sound Studios (Franklin, Tennessee)
- Genres: Gospel, CCM, R&B
- Length: 43:47
- Label: Sparrow
- Producers: Brown Bannister; Christopher Stevens

Mandisa chronology
It's Christmas (2008)	Freedom (2009)	What If We Were Real (2011)

Singles from Freedom
- 1. "My Deliverer" Released: January 27, 2009; 2. "He Is With You" Released: March 3, 2009; 3. "Not Guilty" Released: July 21, 2009

Professional ratings
Review scores
Source	Rating
Jesus Freak Hideout	3.5/5 stars
Allmusic	4/5 stars

Freedom is the third studio album by American Idol contestant Mandisa. The album was released on March 24, 2009. On April 2, 2009, the album debuted at number 83 on the Billboard 200 selling over 7,000 copies in its first week. In 2010, the album was Nominated for Grammy Award for Best Pop/Contemporary Gospel Album of the Year. After just over two years of her album "Freedom" being off the Billboard 200, it re-entered at 178.

== Singles ==
"My Deliverer" was released as the first single from the album on January 27, 2009.

"He Is With You" was released as the second single on March 3, 2009.

"Not Guilty" was released as the third and final single from the album on July 21, 2009.

== Track listing ==
No.	Title	Writer(s)	Producer(s)	Length
1.	"My Deliverer"	Chad Cates, Tony Wood, Jason Walker	Christopher Stevens	3:15
2.	"How Much"	Matthew West, Sam Mizell	C. Stevens	4:00
3.	"He Is With You"	Ronnie Freeman, Cindy Morgan	Brown Bannister	4:03
4.	"The Definition of Me" (featuring Blanca Reyes of Group 1 Crew)	Rebecca Mizell, Jose Manwell Reyes, Sam Mizell, Aaron Rice	C. Stevens	3:30
5.	"Not Guilty"	Mandisa, Matthew West, Sam Mizell	Brown Bannister	4:34
6.	"Leave It In the Valley"	Ben Glover	C. Stevens	3:40
7.	"Victorious"	Sam Mizell, Jeff Pardo	Brown Bannister	3:27
8.	"Broken Hallelujah"	Gina Boe, Ronnie Freeman, Tony Wood	Brown Bannister	5:05
9.	"Freedom Song"	Mandisa, Matthew West, Sam Mizell	C. Stevens	3:38
10.	"Dance, Dance, Dance"	Warryn Campbell, Erica Atkins-Campbell, Trecina Atkins-Campbell	C. Stevens	3:10
11.	"You Wouldn't Cry (Andrew's Song)"	Mandisa, Cindy Morgan, Catt Gravitt	Brown Bannister	5:26

== Personnel ==
- Mandisa – lead vocals, backing vocals (1, 2, 4, 6, 10)
- Christopher Stevens – keyboards (1, 2, 4, 9, 10), programming (1, 2, 4, 6, 9, 10), backing vocals (1, 2, 4, 6), additional keyboards (6), guitars (9), bass (10)
- Ron Rawls – Rhodes piano (2), keyboards (6, 9), Hammond B3 organ (6, 9)
- Blair Masters – keyboards (3, 8, 11), acoustic piano (8)
- Sam Mizell – keyboards (5, 8), programming (5, 7), string arrangements (5)
- Shane Keister – acoustic piano (8)
- Matt Stanfield – keyboards (11)
- Justin York – guitars (1, 2, 4, 6)
- Greg Hagan – electric guitar (3, 5, 7)
- Jerry McPherson – electric guitar (3, 5, 7), guitars (8)
- Mike Payne – electric guitar (3)
- Ben Glover – guitars (6)
- Bernard Harris – bass (1, 2, 4, 6, 7)
- Matt Pierson – bass (3, 11)
- James Holloway – drums (1, 2, 4, 6)
- Dan Needham – drums (3, 7, 11)
- Zach Casebolt – cello (2, 6)
- Claire Indie – violin (2, 6)
- David Davidson – strings (3)
- Brown Bannister – string arrangements (3)
- Chris Carmichael – cello (5), viola (5), violin (5)
- Michelle Swift – backing vocals (1, 5, 8, 11)
- Missi Hale – backing vocals (2, 7, 11)
- Ronnie Freeman – backing vocals (3)
- Cindy Morgan – backing vocals (3)
- Laura Cooksey – backing vocals (4)
- Blanca Reyes – rap (4)
- Nirva Ready – backing vocals (10)

Choir on "Freedom Song"

- Laura Cooksey, Jason Eskridge, Missi Hale, Lakisha Mitchell, Calvin Nowell and Michelle Swift

Technical and Design

- Brad O'Donnell – A&R
- Chance Scoggins – vocal co-production
- Brown Bannister – engineer, digital editing
- Steve Bishir – engineer
- Kent Hooper – engineer
- Billy Whittington – engineer, digital editing
- Kevin Powell – assistant engineer
- David Dillbeck – digital editing
- Craig Swift – digital editing
- Christopher Stevens – mixing (1, 2, 4, 6, 9, 10)
- F. Reid Shippen – mixing (3, 5, 7, 8, 11)
- Buckley Miller – mix assistant (3, 5, 7, 8, 11)
- Chris Athens – mastering at Sterling Sound (New York City, New York)
- Jess Chambers – A&R administration
- Beth Matthews – production assistant
- Jan Cook – art direction
- Micah Kandros – design
- Katie Moore – design
- Kristin Barlowe – photography
- True Artist Management – management

== Charts ==
Chart performance for Freedom
Chart (2009–11)	Peak position
US Billboard 200	83
US Top Christian Albums (Billboard)	4
US Top Catalog Albums (Billboard)	25

== Certifications ==
Region	Certification	Certified units/sales
United States	—	138,000
