= True Beauty (album) =

Studio album by Mandisa
- Released: July 31, 2007
- Recorded: 2006–2007
- Genres: Gospel, CCM, R&B
- Length: 45;27
- Label: Sparrow
- Producers: Shaun Shankel; Drew and Shannon; Brown Bannister; Doubledutch; Christopher Stevens

Mandisa chronology
True Beauty (2007)	It's Christmas (2008)

Singles from True Beauty
- 1. "Only the World" Released: May 22, 2007; 2. "God Speaking" Released: October 22, 2007; 3. "Voice of a Savior" Released: April 2008

Professional ratings
Review scores
Source	Rating
Allmusic	4/5 stars
Entertainment Weekly	B−
Jesus Freak Hideout	3.5/5 stars
People Magazine	3/4 stars
USA Today	3/4 stars
Us Magazine	2.5/4 stars

True Beauty is the Grammy-nominated and debut studio album by American Idol contestant Mandisa. The first single, "Only the World", was released on May 22, 2007, and the full album was released on July 31, 2007. The album covers a remake of gospel duo Mary Mary's hit song "Shackles (Praise You)" (which Mandisa covered on American Idol in the top 11).

Subsequent singles included "God Speaking" and "Voice of a Savior", released to Christian radio in October 2007 and April 2008, respectively.

== Commercial performance ==
The album debuted at number one on the Christian albums chart and number 43 on the Billboard 200 with over 17,000 copies sold in its first week. It broke the Billboard chart record for a female debut in Christian music and is the largest female debut in the history of her label (EMI/Sparrow Records). True Beauty has sold over 219,000 copies as of December 2010. The album spent over a year on Billboard's Christian Albums and Christian and Gospel Albums charts.

== Awards and nominations ==
True Beauty received a Grammy Award nomination in December 2007 for Best Pop/Contemporary Gospel Album.

== Track listing ==
No.	Title	Writer(s)	Producer(s)	Length
1.	"Only the World"	Clint Lagerberg, Sam Mizell, Matthew West	Shaun Shankel	3:23
2.	"True Beauty"	Mandisa, Cindy Morgan, Drew Ramsey	Drew and Shannon	3:23
3.	"God Speaking"	Ronnie Freeman	Brown Bannister	4:55
4.	"Voice of a Savior"	Mizell, West	Doubledutch	4:47
5.	"Love Somebody" (featuring tobyMac)	Cary Barlowe, Mandisa, Toby McKeehan, Jamie Moore, Aaron Rice	Doubledutch, Jamie Moore (additional production)	3:48
6.	"Unrestrained"	Calvin Nowell, Tony Sutherland	Brown Bannister	4:31
7.	"Shackles (Praise You)"	Warryn Campbell, Mary Mary	Christopher Stevens	3:29
8.	"(Never Gonna) Steal My Joy"	Mizell, West	Doubledutch	3:14
9.	"Oh, My Lord" (featuring The Fisk Jubilee Singers)	Justin York	Drew and Shannon	3:17
10.	"Only You"	Mandisa, Shaun Shankel	Shaun Shankel	3:26
11.	"He Will Come"	Morgan	Brown Bannister	7:14
Total length:				45:27

== Personnel ==
- Mandisa – lead vocals, backing vocals (1–3, 5, 7–10)
- Shaun Shankel – programming (1, 10)
- Sam Mizell – programming (1, 10), keyboard programming (3), drum programming (3), backing vocals (4)
- Shannon Sanders – keyboards (2, 9), programming (9)
- Blair Masters – keyboards (3, 6, 11), acoustic piano (6, 11)
- Jamie Kenney – keyboards (4, 8), programming (4, 8)
- Josiah Bell – programming (4, 5), additional programming (8)
- Robert Marvin – programming (4, 5), additional programming (8)
- Jamie Moore – programming (5), bass (5)
- Christopher Stevens – keyboards (7), programming (7), guitars (7), bass (7), drums (7), horn arrangements (7)
- Greg Hagan – acoustic guitar (1), electric guitar (1), guitars (10)
- Mike Payne – electric guitar (1)
- Drew Ramsey – guitars (2, 9), bass (2, 9), programming (9), backing vocals (9)
- Scott Denté – acoustic guitar (3, 6)
- Lynn Nichols – guitars (4)
- Cary Barlowe – guitars (5)
- Tim Roseneu – guitars (5)
- Jerry McPherson – electric guitar (6)
- Akil Thompson – bass (1, 8, 10), guitars (8)
- Tony Lucido – bass (4, 8)
- Todde Lawton – bass (5)
- Matt Pierson – bass (6)
- Dan Needham – drums (1–3, 6, 9, 10)
- Lemar Carter – drums (4)
- Brian Haley – drums (5)
- Ben Phillips – drums (8)
- David Davidson – strings (1)
- Carl Marsh – string arrangements (3)
- Prague Orchestra – strings (3)
- DJ Maj – cuts (5)
- Shane Philen – saxophones (7), horn arrangements (7)
- Rodney J. Mills – trombone (7)
- Tommy Vaughan – trumpet (7), horn arrangements (7)
- John Catchings – cello (11)
- Missi Hale – backing vocals (1, 6, 10)
- Cindy Morgan – backing vocals (2, 9)
- Debreca Smith – backing vocals (2, 9)
- Peter Penrose – backing vocals (4)
- TobyMac – rap (5)
- Nirva Dorsaint-Ready – backing vocals (5–7)
- Gabriel Patillo – backing vocals (5)
- Shonlock – backing vocals (5)
- Drew Cline – backing vocals (6)
- Kimberly Mont – backing vocals (6)
- Calvin Nowell – backing vocals (6)
- Debi Selby – backing vocals (6)
- Michelle Swift – backing vocals (6)
- Chance Scoggins – BGV arrangements (6)
- Jason Eskridge – backing vocals (7)
- The Fisk Jubilee Singers – backing vocals (9)
- Paul Kwami – vocal leader (9)

=== Production ===
- Brad O'Donnell – A&R
- Shaun Shankel – vocal co-producer (1)
- Chance Scoggins – vocal co-producer (1, 3, 6, 11)
- Joseph Prielonzy – production coordinator (1, 10)
- Jan Cook – creative director
- Tim Frank – art direction
- Andy Norris Design – design
- Michael Gomez – photography
- Tanzy Clark-Ragion – hair stylist
- Ony Powers – make-up
- Katie Moore – stylist
- Kami Shahid – stylist

Technical

- Brian Gardner – mastering
- Russ Long – recording (1, 10)
- Sam Mizell – recording (1, 10)
- Joseph Prielonzy – recording (1)
- Shaun Shankel – recording (1, 10), digital editing (1, 10)
- Lee Bridges – digital editing (1, 10)
- Greg Fuqua – recording (2, 9)
- Erik "Keller" Jahner – recording (2, 9), mixing (2, 9)
- Jason Lehning – engineer (4)
- Steve Bishir – recording (3, 6, 11), mixing (11)
- Billy Whittington – digital editing (3, 6), recording (6)
- Joe Baldridge – recording (5), additional editing (5)
- Jamie Moore – recording (5)
- Christopher Stevens – recording (7), mixing (7)
- Scott Velazco – assistant engineer (1, 10)
- Leslie Richter – assistant engineer (4)
- Kevin Powell – assistant engineer (7)
- Josiah Bell – additional recording (4), recording (5, 8)
- Robert Marvin – additional recording (4), mixing (4, 5, 8), recording (5, 8)
- Ben Phillips – additional recording (8)
- Brown Bannister – additional engineer (11)
- Craig Swift – additional engineer (11)
- F. Reid Shippen – mixing (1, 3, 6, 10)
- Buckley Miller – mix assistant (1, 3, 6, 10)
- Andy Selby – mixing (4), digital editing (4, 5, 8), additional editing (5)
- Dave Piechura – additional digital editing assistant (4, 5, 8)
- Joshua Crosby – mix assistant (5)

Studios

- Recorded at The Lealand House, Vibe 56, Drew's Groove, Southside Studios, Brownstone Recording, Ocean Way Nashville, Dutchland Studios, The Border, Bletchley Park Studios, Townsend Sound Studio and First Avenue Sound (Nashville, Tennessee); Garage Rock Studios and Fabmusic (Franklin, Tennessee); Livehorns.com (Mobile, Alabama).
- Overdubs (Track 3) recorded at Townsend Sound Studio.
- Mixed at Sound Stage Studios, Dutchland Studios, Townsend Sound Studio and First Avenue Sound (Nashville, Tennessee).
- Additional edit assistance at Vintageking.com
- Mastered at Bernie Grundman Mastering (Hollywood, California).

== Charts ==
Chart performance for True Beauty
Chart (2007–09)	Peak position
US Billboard 200	43
US Top Christian Albums (Billboard)	1
US Top Catalog Albums (Billboard)	29
