= Fellowship Bible Church Nashville, Tennessee =

Founded in 1997, Fellowship Bible Church of Brentwood, Tennessee is a non-denominational Christian church with campuses in Brentwood and Franklin, TN. Started as a "church plant" by Fellowship Bible Church of Little Rock, Arkansas, the church is governed by a plurality of elders, emphasizes the authority of the Bible, and employs a team-based approach to ministry. The teaching team is made up of three pastors: Rob Sweet and Lloyd Shadrach at the Brentwood and Franklin campuses, and Phil Covert at Fellowship Nashville. Ring the Bells, a Christmas television special, was produced by Fellowship Bible Church and filmed by The Worship Network on location in Brentwood, Tennessee. The evening's music was also released in the form of a 2-disc CD set in 2008 and included performances by many artists such as Geoff Moore, Cheri Keaggy, Ronnie Freeman, Christy Nockels, Cindy Morgan, and Jason Ingram.

Fellowship Bible Church has partnered with Dallas Theological Seminary (DTS) by hosting a "mobile" MA in Christian Leadership offered by DTS. The mobile degree program is offered in four cities across the USA including Nashville, TN.

On February 22, 2014, Fellowship Bible Church hosted Wait No More, a conference designed to help find permanent homes for children in the Tennessee foster care system. The conference was organized by Focus on the Family and included representatives from the Middle Tennessee Orphan Alliance, the Tennessee Department of Children's Services, and many faith-based organizations.

In 2010, Fellowship Bible Church started another campus in Franklin. In 2016, a Nashville campus launched with leadership of Phil Covert and now meets at Wavery-Belmont Elementary School in Nashville. The Nashville campus launched as an independent church October 1, 2018.
