= Back to You (Mandisa song) =

Single by Mandisa

from the album Overcomer
- Released: March 17, 2014
- Recorded: 2013
- Genre: Contemporary Christian music
- Length: 3:36
- Label: Sparrow
- Songwriter(s): Ben Glover; David Garcia; Alan Powell

Mandisa singles chronology
"Overcomer" (2013)	"Back to You" (2014)	"Press On" (2015)

"Back to You" is the second single, released on March 17, 2014, from Mandisa's fourth album, Overcomer.

== Composition ==
"Back to You" is originally in the key of E Major, with a tempo of 93 beats per minute. Written in common time, Mandisa's vocal range spans from B_{3} to G#_{5} during the song.

== Charts ==
=== Weekly charts ===
Weekly chart performance for "Back to You"
Chart (2014)	Peak position
US Hot Christian Songs (Billboard)	12
US Christian Airplay (Billboard)	7
US Christian AC (Billboard)	11

=== Year-end charts ===
2014 year-end chart performance for "Back to You"
Chart (2014)	Peak position
US Christian Songs (Billboard)	31
US Christian Airplay (Billboard)	31
