= Stronger (Mandisa song) =

Single by Mandisa

from the album What If We Were Real
- Released: January 7, 2011
- Recorded: July 2010 – January 2011
- Genre: CCM; Christian R&B; Dance-pop
- Length: 3:33
- Label: Sparrow
- Songwriters: David Garcia; Ben Glover; Christopher Stevens

Mandisa singles chronology
"Not Guilty" (2009)	"Stronger" (2011)	"Waiting for Tomorrow" (2011)

Music video
- "Stronger" on YouTube

"Stronger" is the lead single by singer-songwriter Mandisa from her third album What If We Were Real.

== Composition ==
"Stronger" is originally in the key of A♭ Major, with a tempo of 174 beats per minute. Written in common time, Mandisa's vocal range spans from Eb_{3} to Eb_{5} during the song.

== Live performances ==
Mandisa performed the song on Good Morning America.

== Commercial performance ==
"Stronger" peaked at number one on the Hot Christian Songs chart, becoming her first song to do so. As of August 31, 2011 the song has sold 194,000 copies.

== Music video ==
A lyric video for the single "Stronger" was released on February 24, 2015.

== Charts ==
=== Weekly charts ===
Weekly chart performance for "Stronger"
Chart (2011)	Peak position
US Bubbling Under Hot 100 (Billboard)	25
US Hot Christian Songs (Billboard)	1
US Christian Airplay (Billboard)	1
US Christian AC (Billboard)	1

=== Year-end charts ===
2011 year-end chart performance for "Stronger"
Chart (2011)	Position
US Christian Songs (Billboard)	3
US Christian AC (Billboard)	3

2012 year-end chart performance for "Stronger"
Chart (2012)	Position
US Christian Digital Song Sales (Billboard)	41

== Certifications ==
Region	Certification	Certified units/sales
United States (RIAA)	Gold	500,000^{‡}
^{‡} Sales+streaming figures based on certification alone.
