= What If We Were Real =

Studio album by Mandisa
- Released: April 5, 2011
- Recorded: July 2010 – January 2011
- Studio: FabMusic, Glomo Studio and The Givens House (Franklin, Tennessee)
- Genre: Gospel, CCM, R&B
- Length: 38:32
- Label: Sparrow
- Producer: Christopher Stevens; David Garcia; Dan Muckala; Chance Scoggins

Mandisa chronology
| Freedom (2009) | What If We Were Real (2011) | Overcomer (2013) |

Singles from What If We Were Real
- 1. "Stronger" Released: January 7, 2011; 2. "Waiting for Tomorrow" Released: 2011; 3. "Good Morning" Released: 2012

What If We Were Real is the fourth studio album by CCM singer Mandisa. The album was released on April 5, 2011, on Sparrow Records. This album received a nomination at 54th Grammy Awards for Best Contemporary Christian Music Album.

== Background ==
Mandisa began work on the album in July 2010. She also co-wrote three songs on the album. The album also features a guest appearance from tobyMac on the song "Good Morning".

== Singles ==
The first single off of the album was "Stronger". It peaked at number one on the Hot Christian Songs chart and as of August 31, 2011, has sold 194,000 copies.

"Waiting for Tomorrow" was the second single and peaked at number nine on the Hot Christian AC chart.

"Good Morning" featuring Christian artist TobyMac was the third single. It sold 138,000 copies. On October 11, 2014, it has been certified Gold by RIAA.

== Track listing ==
| No. | Title | Writer(s) | Length |
|---|---|---|---|
| 1. | "Stronger" | Christopher Stevens, David Garcia, Ben Glover | 3:33 |
| 2. | "What If We Were Real" | Cindy Morgan, Mandisa Hundley, Glover | 3:19 |
| 3. | "These Days" | Glover, Tony Wood, Brian White | 3:17 |
| 4. | "The Truth About Me" | Wood, Simon Hawkins, Kerrie Roberts, Ronnie Freeman | 3:32 |
| 5. | "Say Goodbye" | Sam Mizell, Jeff Pardo | 3:12 |
| 6. | "Good Morning" (featuring tobyMac) | Toby McKeehan, Jaime Moore, Cary Barlowe, Hundley, Aaron Rice | 3:23 |
| 7. | "Waiting for Tomorrow" | Glover, Pardo | 3:17 |
| 8. | "Just Cry" | Hundley, Wood, Freeman | 4:35 |
| 9. | "Temporary Fills" | Ricky Free, Michael Fordinal | 2:44 |
| 10. | "Free" | Rice, Lauren Evans, Moore, Barlowe | 4:09 |
| 11. | "Lifeline" | Robin Ghosh, Wood & Jason Barton | 3:28 |
| Total length: | | | 38:29 |

== Personnel ==
- Mandisa – vocals, backing vocals
- David Garcia – keyboards, programming, guitars, bass, backing vocals
- Christopher Stevens – keyboards, programming, guitars, bass, backing vocals
- Dan Muckala – programming, arrangements
- Chris Bevins – programming
- Craig Swift – programming
- Chance Scoggins – acoustic piano
- Adam Lester – acoustic guitar, electric guitar
- Tommy Platt – guitars
- Justin Ostrander – guitars
- Ron Robinson – guitars
- Bernard Harris – bass
- Tommy Lee – bass
- Tony Lucido – bass
- Jamie Holloway – drums
- Garth Justice – drums
- Matt Butler – cello
- Zach Casebolt – cello
- Claire Indie – cello
- Blanca Callahan – backing vocals
- Missi Hale – backing vocals
- Jovaun Woods – backing vocals
- tobyMac – rap (6)

=== Production ===
- Brad O'Donnell – A&R
- Karrie Hardwick – A&R
- David Garcia – producer (1, 7, 11), mixing (1, 7, 11)
- Christopher Stevens – producer (1, 2, 5–7, 9, 11), mixing (1, 2, 5–7, 9, 11)
- Dan Muckala – producer (3, 4, 10), mixing (3, 4, 10)
- Chance Scoggins – producer (8)
- Bill Whittington – engineer (8)
- Kent Hooper – mixing (8)
- Taylor Stevens – assistant engineer (1, 2, 5–7, 9, 11), editing (1, 2, 5–7, 9, 11)
- Dan Deurloo – assistant engineer (3, 4, 10)
- Chuck Butler – editing (3, 4, 10)
- Chris Gehringer – mastering at Sterling Sound (New York City, New York)
- Jan Cook – art direction
- Austin Hale – design
- Kristin Barlowe – photography

== Commercial performance ==
The album sold 8,000 copies, debuting at No. 66 on the Billboard 200 albums chart and at number two on the Christian Albums chart. The album debuted with higher sales and peaked in better chart positions than her previous album, Freedom. It has sold a total of 196,000 copies as of August 2012.

== Charts ==
=== Weekly charts ===
Weekly chart performance for What If We Were Real
| Chart (2011–13) | Peak position |
|---|---|
| US Billboard 200 | 66 |
| US Christian Albums (Billboard) | 2 |
| US Top Catalog Albums (Billboard) | 23 |

=== Year-end charts ===
2011 year-end chart performance for What If We Were Real
| Chart (2011) | Peak position |
|---|---|
| US Christian Albums (Billboard) | 18 |

2012 year-end chart performance for What If We Were Real
| Chart (2012) | Peak position |
|---|---|
| US Christian Albums (Billboard) | 8 |
