= It's a Wonderful Christmas =

Studio album by Michael W. Smith
- Released: October 16, 2007
- Genre: Christmas, pop, instrumental
- Length: 39:46
- Label: Reunion/Sparrow
- Producer: Michael W. Smith, David Hamilton

Michael W. Smith chronology
Stand (2006)	It's a Wonderful Christmas (2007)	A New Hallelujah (2008)

Singles from It's a Wonderful Christmas
- 1. "Christmas Day" Released: November 20, 2007

It's a Wonderful Christmas is an album by Christian recording artist Michael W. Smith. Released in October 2007, this epic album is Smith's third album of Christmas music and features four choirs and a 65-piece orchestra. About half the album is instrumental pieces, including "What Child is This", "Audrey's Gift", and "It's a Wonderful Christmas". Vocal numbers such as "The Promise" and "Christmas Angels" reflect Smith's trademark personal touch and evoke his previous Christmas albums, Christmas (1989) and Christmastime (1998). Smith utilizes the full sound of the orchestra and choirs to produce an album that exudes a "mastery of the adult contemporary sound" and adds "so richly to the Christmas songbook."

== Track listing ==
All tracks are written by Michael W. Smith, except where noted.

No.	Title	Writer(s)	Length
1.	"Christmas Angels"		3:50
2.	"It's a Wonderful Christmas"	Michael W. Smith, David Hamilton	5:05
3.	"The Promise"		5:05
4.	"Song for the King"		4:19
5.	"Christmas Day" (featuring Mandisa)		3:20
6.	"A Highland Carol"		2:18
7.	"Sing Noel, Sing Hallelujah"		3:40
8.	"What Child Is This?"	Traditional	4:48
9.	"Son of God"		2:53
10.	"Audrey’s Gift"		1:49
11.	"All Year Long"		2:39
Total length:			39:46

== Reception ==
Professional ratings
Review scores
Source	Rating
About	4/5 stars
AllMusic	4/5 stars
Billboard	Mixed
Jesus Freak Hideout	4/5 stars

It's a Wonderful Christmas sold 12,759 copies in its first week, 6,000 of them digital. The album has since sold 39,000 copies.

The album received several positive reviews. However, Billboard gave the album a mixed review.

In 2008, the album won a Dove Award for Christmas Album of the Year at the 39th GMA Dove Awards.

== Personnel ==
- Michael W. Smith – vocals (1, 3, 5, 7, 9, 11), grand piano (1–5, 8, 9, 10), arrangements
- David Hamilton – orchestra conductor (1–9, 11), orchestra arrangements (1, 2, 3, 7, 8, 9, 11), choir arrangements (1, 3, 5, 7, 9), synthesizer (1, 5), Hammond B3 organ (5), celeste (5), grand piano (11), rhythm track arrangements (11)
- Adam Lester – electric guitars (1, 5)
- James Gregory – bass (1, 5)
- Craig Nelson – upright bass (11)
- Paul Leim – drums (1, 5, 11)
- Sam Bacco – Scottish snare drum (6), bass drum (6)
- David Davidson – violin solo (4)
- Skip Cleavinger – Highland bagpipes (6), penny whistle (6), low whistle (8)
- Carl Marsh – orchestra arrangements (1, 5)
- Ronn Huff – orchestra arrangements (6)
- The London Session Orchestra – orchestra (1–9, 11)
- Perry Montague-Mason – concertmaster
- Isobel Griffiths – orchestra contractor
- Charlotte Matthews – orchestra contractor
- Lori Casteel – music preparation
- Mike Casteel – music preparation
- Ric Domenico – music preparation
- Eberhard Ramm – music preparation
- The Nashville Choir – choir (1, 3, 7, 9)
- John Coates – The Nashville Choir director (1, 3, 7, 9)
- Children's Choir – children choir (1, 5)
- Sandy Hamilton – Children's Choir director (1, 5)
- Kathy Goodrich – Children's Choir assistant director (1, 5)
- Marie Morris – Children's Choir assistant director (1, 5)
- New Cumberland Choir – choir (3, 7, 9)
- Greg Thomas – New Cumberland Choir contractor (3, 7, 9)
- The Choristers of Reigate St. Mary's – boychoir (3, 9)
- John Tobin – Reigate St. Mary's choir master (3, 9)
- Mandisa – vocals (5)
- Bonnie Keen – backing vocals (11)

== Production ==
- Michael W. Smith – producer, executive producer
- David Hamilton – producer, digital editing
- Michael Blanton – executive producer
- Ronnie Brookshire – rhythm section recording
- Mark Petaccia – rhythm section recording assistant
- Humberto Gatica – orchestra recording, additional piano recording
- Andrew Dudman – orchestra recording, boychoir recording additional piano recording
- Fred Paragano – additional piano recording
- David Schober – additional piano recording, mixing
- Dominic Christie – boychoir recording assistant
- Scrap Marshall – boychoir recording assistant
- Jeff Pitzer – recording (violin solo on "Song for the King")
- Bill Whittington – recording (New Cumberland Choir and Highland bagpipes)
- Lowell Reynolds – recording assistant (New Cumberland Choir and Highland bagpipes)
- Doug Sarrett – recording (The Nashville Choir and Children's Choir)
- Steven Beers – recording assistant (The Nashville Choir and Children's Choir)
- Dave Dillbeck – vocal recording, digital editing
- Derik Lee – vocal recording (Mandisa's vocal)
- Brian Calhoon – mix assistant
- Jeff Cain – digital editing
- Andrew Mendelson – mastering
- Melissa Leonelli – librarian, production assistant
- Ken Johnson – production manager
- Jason McArthur – A&R coordination
- Michelle Box – A&R production
- Allen Clark – photography
- Stephanie McBrayer – art direction, stylist
- Tim Parker – art direction
- Michealle Vanderpoolhair – hair, make-up

Studios

- Blackbird Studios (Nashville, Tennessee) – recording location, New Cumberland Choir and Highland bagpipes for rhythm section.
- Brentwood Baptist Church (Brentwood, Tennessee) – The Nashville Choir and Children's Choir recording location.
- Deer Valley Studios (Franklin, Tennessee) – vocal recording location.
- Paragon Studios (Franklin, Tennessee) – vocal and additional piano recording location, mixing location.
- Studio One at Abbey Road Studios (London, England) – recording location for orchestra, boychoir and additional piano.
- Legacy Recording Studios (New York City, New York) – Mandisa's vocal recording location.
- Georgetown Masters (Nashville, Tennessee) – mastering location.

== Charts ==
Chart	Peak position
US Billboard 200	54
US Billboard Top Christian Albums	2
US Billboard Top Pop Catalog Albums	15
US Billboard Top Holiday Albums	2
