= Ron Rawls =

American Christian musician (born 1983)

- Born: Ronald H. Rawls II; November 20, 1983 (age 42)
- Origin: Nashville, Tennessee
- Genres: Christian
- Occupations: music producer, composer, songwriter, pianist, organist, keyboardist
- Instruments: piano, keyboards, organ, strings
- Years active: 2007–present
- Website: rawlsmusic.com

Ronald H. "Ron" Rawls II (born November 20, 1983) is an American Christian musician, who is mainly a producer, songwriter, and composer of sacred music. He is a Grammy Award-winning and GMA Dove Award-winning producer.

== Early and personal life ==
Rawls was born, Ronald H. Rawls II, on November 20, 1983. He is married to Shayna Rawls, where they reside in Tampa, Florida.

== Music career ==
His music production songwriting career commenced around 2007, where he obtained a Grammy Award and GMA Dove Award, for his production work on Mandisa's 2013 studio album, Overcomer.
