= God Speaking =

Single by Mandisa

from the album True Beauty
- Released: October 22, 2007
- Recorded: 2007
- Genre: R&B/Gospel
- Label: Sparrow
- Songwriter: Ronnie Freeman
- Producers: Clint Lagerberg; Sam Mizell; Matthew West

Mandisa singles chronology
"Only the World" (2007)	"God Speaking" (2007)	"Christmas Makes Me Cry" (2007)

"God Speaking" is the second single from Mandisa's album, True Beauty. It was released to Christian radio on October 22, 2007. It was written by Ronnie Freeman, who also recorded it as the title track for his second album.

== Charts ==
Chart performance for "God Speaking"
Chart (2007)	Peak position
US Hot Christian Songs (Billboard)	26
