= Overcomer (album) =

Studio album by Mandisa
- Released: August 27, 2013
- Recorded: 2012–2013
- Genres: Gospel; CCM; pop
- Length: 43:34; 1:01:41 (deluxe)
- Label: Sparrow
- Producers: Chuck Butler; David Garcia; Ron Rawls; Christopher Stevens

Mandisa chronology
What If We Were Real (2011)	Overcomer (2013)	Out of the Dark (2017)

Singles from Overcomer
- 1. "Overcomer" Released: June 21, 2013; 2. "Back to You" Released: March 17, 2014; 3. "Press On" Released: February 16, 2015

Overcomer is the fifth studio album by American contemporary Christian music singer Mandisa. The album was released on August 27, 2013, on Sparrow Records. The album has achieved commercial charting successes, as well as critical acclaim by music critics. It also won a Grammy Award in the category of Best Contemporary Christian Music Album.

== Critical reception ==
Professional ratings
Review scores
Source	Rating
About.com	4.5/5 stars
CCM Magazine	4/5 stars
Christian Music Zine	4.5/5 stars
CM Addict	4/5 stars
Cross Rhythms	9/10 squares
Indie Vision Music	4/5 stars
Jesus Freak Hideout	4/5 stars
Louder Than the Music	4.5/5 stars
New Release Tuesday	4/5 stars
The Phantom Tollbooth	4.5/5 stars
Worship Leader	4.5/5 stars

Overcomer garnered critical acclaim from the six music critics to critique the album. At Worship Leader, Randy Cross evoked that "This is without a doubt the most positive and reassuring album of the year!" Kim Jones of About.com implored that with "Those major writing talents combined with her stellar voice equal a fantastic project" because of this "Mandisa has done it again and we all win." At CCM Magazine, Grace S. Aspinwall called this "an encouraging and hopeful project." Tony Coupe of Cross Rhythms felt that "The whole of this quality album comes across as autobiographical and if you are looking for an album to encourage, this will do nicely." Bert Gangl of Jesus Freak Hideout wrote that the release has an "infectiously positive vibe, rock-solid melodic content and contagiously enthusiastic delivery by a singer whose voice, on her worst day, could probably still shatter the average Waterford crystal centerpiece, any such word-related deficits become largely imperceptible and, truth be told, seem positively irrelevant in the grand scheme of a work this appealing." At New Release Tuesday, Kevin Davis noted this release comes "loaded with positive grace-filled messages of hope from someone who has struggled with the pressures of life and understands that true happiness and empowerment only comes from her relationship with God.", and stated that the music will cause people to "dance and sing along". Jonathan Andre of Indie Vision Music told that this was "Well done", and called this "a poignant and treasured album". At Christian Music Zine, Joshua Andre wrote that "Overcomer is stacked with inspirational tune after inspirational tune." Andrew Funderburk of CM Addict told that "While not like previous albums artistically, at points the album doesn't feel as if it's been taken to the next level", however he called the effort "upbeat, energized, yet fuels a message of hope to those who are down." At The Phantom Tollbooth, Michael Dalton felt that "Maturity does not come easily.", and noted that "Overcomer is like a roadmap to follow." Jono Davies of Louder Than the Music affirmed that "She has produced yet another album of quality pop music for the listener to really get their teeth into."

== Commercial performance ==
For the Billboard charting week of September 14, 2013, Overcomer was the No. 29 album sold in all of the United States via the Billboard 200, and it was the No. 1 Top Christian Album as well with over 12,000 copies sold in its first week. The album has sold 140,000 copies in the US as of July 2014.

The title track "Overcomer" was No.1 on the National Christian Audience chart for 12 weeks, as well as No. 1 for 14 weeks on SoundScan's Christian/Gospel Core Digital sales chart.

== Awards ==
Overcomer won Best Contemporary Christian Music Album in the 2014 Grammy Awards. The title song from the album also won Best Contemporary Christian Music Song for songwriters David Garcia, Ben Glover and Christopher Stevens.

== Singles ==
"Overcomer" was released as the first single from the album on June 21, 2013.

"Back To You" was released as the second single on March 17, 2014.

"Press On" was released as the third single from the album on February 16, 2015.

== Track listing ==
Standard edition
No.	Title	Writer(s)	Length
1.	"Overcomer"	Ben Glover, Christopher Stevens, David Garcia	3:43
2.	"Back to You"	Ben Glover, Garcia, Alan Powell	3:36
3.	"The Distance"	Mandisa Hundley, Stevens, Matthew West	3:33
4.	"Face 2 Face"	Garcia, Glover, Hundley	3:54
5.	"Press On"	Chuck Butler, Juan Otero, Jeff Pardo	3:21
6.	"What Scars Are For"	Hundley, Sam Mizell, Pardo	3:25
7.	"Dear John"	Ronnie Freeman, Hundley, Tony Wood	3:50
8.	"At All Times"	Israel Houghton, Hundley	4:00
9.	"Joy Unspeakable"	Freeman	3:38
10.	"Praying for You"	Chris August, Hundley	3:34
11.	"Where You Begin"	Glover, Britt Nicole, Cindy Morgan	4:00
Total length:			43:34

iTunes deluxe edition
No.	Title	Writer(s)	Length
12.	"Overcomer" (Capital Kings Remix)	Stevens, Garcia	3:55
13.	"Press On" (CB Ultra Run Remix)	Butler, Otero, Pardo	4:43
14.	"I Hope You Dance"	Mark D. Sanders, Tia Sillers	4:34
15.	"Cradle Me (Patsy's Lullaby)"	Patsy Clairmont, Hundley, Ronald Rawls	4:55
Total length:			61:41

== Charts ==
=== Weekly charts ===
Weekly chart performance for Overcomer
Chart (2013)	Peak position
US Billboard 200	29
US Top Christian Albums (Billboard)	1

=== Year-end charts ===
2013 year-end chart performance for Overcomer
Chart (2013)	Peak position
US Christian Albums (Billboard)	25

2014 year-end chart performance for Overomer
Chart (2014)	Peak position
US Christian Albums (Billboard)	10

2015 year-end chart performance for Overomer
Chart (2015)	Peak position
US Christian Albums (Billboard)	37
