= Unfinished (Mandisa song) =

Single by Mandisa

from the album Out of the Dark
- Released: March 10, 2017
- Recorded: 2016
- Genre: Christian R&B; CCM; Christian rock
- Length: 3:35
- Label: Sparrow
- Songwriters: Colby Wedgeworth; Ben Glover

Mandisa singles chronology
"Press On" (2015)	"Unfinished" (2017)	"I'm Still Here" (2017)

Music video
- "Unfinished" on YouTube

"Unfinished" is a song by Mandisa, released as the lead single from her fifth studio album, Out of the Dark on March 10, 2017.

== Composition ==
"Unfinished" is originally in the key of A major, with a tempo of 93 beats per minute. Written in common time, Mandisa's vocal range spans from A_{3} to E_{5} during the song.

== Commercial performance ==
On March 25, 2017, Unfinished entered the Billboard Hot Christian Songs chart at 34. The following week, it leaped to number 13 after a digital sales boost. After the release of her fifth studio album, Out of the Dark, the song entered the Top 10 for the first time at number 8, its peak. The song has spent 26 weeks on the Hot Christian Songs chart.

== Music video ==
A lyric video for the single "Unfinished" was released on March 17, 2017.

== Accolades ==
Awards
Year	Organization	Award	Result	Ref.
2018	GMA Dove Awards	Song of the Year	Nominated	

== Charts ==
=== Weekly charts ===
Weekly chart performance for "Unfinished"
Chart (2017)	Peak position
US Hot Christian Songs (Billboard)	8
US Christian Airplay (Billboard)	4
US Christian AC (Billboard)	4

=== Year-end charts ===
2017 year-end chart performance for "Unfinished"
Chart (2017)	Peak position
US Christian Songs (Billboard)	15
US Christian Airplay (Billboard)	15
US Christian Hot AC/CHR (Billboard)	37
