= It's Christmas (Mandisa album) =

Studio album by Mandisa
- Released: October 14, 2008
- Recorded: 2008
- Genre: Gospel, Christmas, CCM, R&B
- Length: 46:38
- Label: Sparrow
- Producer: Andrew Ramsey; Shannon Sanders; Brown Bannister; Michael W. Smith; David Hamilton

Mandisa chronology
True Beauty (2007)	It's Christmas (2008)	Freedom (2009)

Professional ratings
Review scores
Source	Rating
Jesus Freak Hideout	4/5 stars

It's Christmas is the second studio album and first Christmas album from contemporary Christian singer Mandisa, released on October 14, 2008. As of November 2012, the album has sold 53,000 copies.

A reissue of the album, It's Christmas (Christmas Angel Edition), was released in 2012 with three additional songs.

== Track listing ==
Album release
No.	Title	Writer(s)	Length
1.	"What Christmas Means to Me"	Anna Gordy Gaye, George Gordy, Allen Story	3:03
2.	"Feliz Navidad / Joy to the World"	José Feliciano, Traditional	3:24
3.	"Christmas Makes Me Cry" (featuring Matthew West)	Matthew West	4:43
4.	"Christmas Bell Medley (Silver Bells / Carol of the Bells / Caroling, Caroling)"	Alfred Burt, Traditional, Jay Livingston, Ray Evans	5:06
5.	"Silent Night"	Traditional	4:32
6.	"Angels We Have Heard on High"	Traditional	3:43
7.	"Little Drummer Boy"	Katherine Kennicott Davis, Henry Onorati, Harry Simeone	3:52
8.	"Christmas Day" (featuring Michael W. Smith)	Wes King, Cindy Morgan, Michael W. Smith	3:19
9.	"O Holy Night"	Traditional	5:42
10.	"Mary's Little Boy Child"	Jester Hairston	3:46
11.	"Children Go Where I Send Thee"	Traditional	4:36
Total length:			45:46

== Personnel ==
- Mandisa – vocals
- Shane Keister – acoustic piano, Fender Rhodes, Wurlitzer electric piano, Hammond B3 organ, arrangements, horn arrangements, string arrangements
- Blair Masters – keyboards
- Roger Ryan – acoustic piano, arrangements
- Sam Mizell – programming
- Michael W. Smith – acoustic piano (4), vocals (4)
- David Hamilton – synthesizer (4), Hammond B3 organ (4), celeste (4)
- Tom Hemby – guitars
- Jerry McPherson – guitars, electric guitar
- Michael Ripoll – guitars
- Stephen Leiweke – guitars
- Adam Lester – electric guitar (4)
- Bernard Harris – bass
- David Hungate – bass, upright bass
- James Gregory – bass (4)
- Matt Pierson – bass
- Joe Powell – bass
- Dan Needham – drums
- Paul Leim – drums (4)
- Eric Darken – percussion
- Sam Levine – horns, flute
- Doug Moffett – horns
- Barry Green – horns
- Shane Philen – saxophones
- Rodney J. Mills – trombone, horn arrangements
- Sarighani Reist – cello
- Jim Grosjean – viola
- David Angell – violin
- David Davidson – violin, strings
- Pamela Sixfin – violin
- The Nashville String Machine – strings
- Carl Marsh – arrangements, string arrangements
- Philip Keveren – arrangements, string arrangements
- Brown Bannister – arrangements
- Ty Smith – bell arrangements
- Matthew West – vocals (2)
- Jason Eskridge – backing vocals
- Anthony Evans – backing vocals
- Missi Hale – backing vocals
- Debi Selby – backing vocals
- Debreca Smith – backing vocals
- Jerard Woods – backing vocals
- Jovaun Woods – backing vocals

== Charts ==
Chart performance for It's Christmas
Chart (2008–12)	Peak position
US Billboard 200	85
US Top Holiday Albums (Billboard)	18
US Top Catalog Albums (Billboard)	14
