= Overcomer (song) =

Single by Mandisa

from the album Overcomer
- Released: June 21, 2013
- Recorded: 2012–2013
- Genre: CEDM; Christian pop; Christian R&B
- Length: 3:43
- Label: Sparrow
- Songwriters: David Garcia; Ben Glover; Christopher Stevens
- Producers: Garcia; Stevens

Mandisa singles chronology
"Waiting for Tomorrow" (2011)	"Overcomer" (2013)	"'Back to You'" (2014)

Music video
- "Overcomer" on YouTube

"Overcomer" is the song by American singer Mandisa, released on June 21, 2013, as the lead single from her fourth album of the same name.

== Composition ==
"Overcomer" is originally in the key of B-flat major, with a tempo of 120 beats per minute. Written in common time, Mandisa's vocal range spans from G_{3} to F_{5} during the song.

== Commercial performance ==
Overcomer reached No. 1 on the Billboard Hot Christian Songs chart, and No. 3 on their Bubbling Under Hot 100 chart, spending a total of nine weeks on the latter chart. It also stayed No. 1 on the National Christian Audience chart for 12 weeks, as well as No. 1 for 14 weeks on SoundScan's Christian/Gospel Core Digital sales chart.

The song was certified Gold by the RIAA on November 13, 2014, and achieved Platinum certification on January 23, 2020.

== Music video ==
The music video's world premiere was aired on Good Morning America on September 5, 2013. The music video for the song premiered on September 12, 2013 on VEVO. Furthermore, the video has over 60 million views on YouTube. Featured in the video are Gabby Giffords, Mark Kelly, Robin Roberts, Scott Hamilton, and Hannah Curlee.

== Live performances ==
Mandisa performed the song on television for the first time on Good Morning America.

== Use in media ==
The song was used as the title song for the Good Morning America series "Overcomers", in which host Robin Roberts asked viewers to share their personal stories to the world. It was also featured on WOW Hits 2014 in 2013 and in the motion picture of the same name in 2019.

== Accolades ==
The song won a Grammy award in 2014 for Best Contemporary Christian Music Song for its songwriters David Garcia, Ben Glover and Christopher Stevens.

Awards
Year	Organization	Award	Result	Ref.
2014	Grammy Awards	Best Contemporary Christian Music Song	Won	
2014	Billboard Music Awards	Top Christian Song	Nominated	
2014	GMA Dove Awards	Song of the Year	Nominated	
2014	GMA Dove Awards	Contemporary Christian Performance of the Year	Nominated	

== Charts ==
=== Weekly charts ===
Weekly chart performance for "Overcomer"
Chart (2013–14)	Peak position
Australia TRAA (Top 30)	1
UK Cross Rhythms Weekly Chart	2
US Bubbling Under Hot 100 (Billboard)	3
US Hot Christian Songs (Billboard)	1
US Christian Airplay (Billboard)	1
US Christian AC (Billboard)	1
US Digital Song Sales (Billboard)	74
US Heatseekers Songs (Billboard)	17
US Radio Songs (Billboard)	98

=== Year-end charts ===
2013 year-end chart performance for "Overcomer"
Chart (2013)	Position
UK Cross Rhythms Annual Chart	38
US Christian Songs (Billboard)	13
US Christian AC (Billboard)	13

2014 year-end chart performance for "Overcomer"
Chart (2014)	Position
US Christian Songs (Billboard)	14
US Christian Airplay (Billboard)	20
US Christian AC (Billboard)	20

=== Decade-end charts ===
Decade-end chart performance for "Overcomer"
Chart (2010s)	Position
US Christian Songs (Billboard)	14

== Certifications ==
Region	Certification	Certified units/sales
United States (RIAA)	Platinum	1,000,000^{‡}
^{‡} Sales+streaming figures based on certification alone.
