= Only the World =

Single by Mandisa

from the album True Beauty
- Released: May 22, 2007
- Recorded: 2007
- Genre: R&B/Gospel
- Label: Sparrow
- Songwriter(s): Sam Mizell, Matthew West, Clinton Lagerberg
- Producer(s): Shaun Shankel

Mandisa singles chronology
"Only the World" (2007)	"God Speaking" (2007)

"Only the World" is the debut single from American Idol finalist, Mandisa, from her True Beauty album.

It has given the artist her first number one on the Billboard Hot Singles Sales chart. It stayed on the chart for 49 weeks.

== Track listing ==
1. "Only the World" (Sam Mizell, Matthew West)
2. "True Beauty" (Mandisa, Cindy Morgan, Drew Ramsey)

== Charts ==
Chart performance for "Only the World"
Chart (2007)	Peak position
US Christian Songs (Billboard)	7
US Christian Airplay (Billboard)	7
US Christian AC (Billboard)	6
