= Voice of a Savior =

Single by Mandisa

from the album True Beauty
- Released: April 2008
- Recorded: 2007
- Genre: R&B/Gospel
- Label: Sparrow
- Songwriter(s): Sam Mizell, Matthew West
- Producer(s): Clint Lagerberg; Sam Mizell; Matthew West

Mandisa singles chronology
"Christmas Day" (2007)	"Voice of a Savior" (2008)	"Lose My Soul" (2008)

"Voice of a Savior" is a single from Mandisa. It is her third single from her album True Beauty and her fifth single total. Mandisa released "Voice of a Savior" on her official MySpace page in April 2008.

== Charts ==
Chart performance for "Voice of a Saviour"
Chart (2008)	Peak position
US Christian AC (Billboard)	30
