= Christmas Makes Me Cry =

Single by Mandisa featuring Matthew West

from the album It's Christmas
- Released: November 6, 2007
- Recorded: 2007
- Genre: R&B/Gospel
- Label: Sparrow
- Songwriter: Matthew West
- Producers: Clint Lagerberg; Sam Mizell; Matthew West

Mandisa singles chronology
"God Speaking" (2007)	"Christmas Makes Me Cry" (2007)	"Christmas Day" (2007)

"Christmas Makes Me Cry" is the third single from Christian singer, Mandisa. The single comes from her 2007 Christmas EP, Christmas Joy, and was released on November 6, 2007. It features Christian singer and producer, Matthew West. The song was re-released a year later as the first single from Mandisa's full-length Christmas album It's Christmas.

== Release history ==
Region	Date	Version
United States	November 6, 2007	Original
United States	October 14, 2008	Re-Release

== Charts ==
Chart (2007)	Peak position
U.S. Hot Christian Songs	3
U.S. Hot Christian A.C.	2
Chart (2008)	Peak position
U.S. Hot Christian Songs	25
U.S. Hot Christian A.C.	27
