= Lose My Soul =

Single by TobyMac featuring Kirk Franklin and Mandisa

from the album Portable Sounds
- Released: 2008
- Recorded: 2007
- Genre: CCM; hip hop soul; R&B; traditional black gospel
- Length: 6:15 (album version); 4:15 (single version)
- Label: ForeFront
- Songwriters: Toby McKeehan; Christopher Stevens; Michael Ripoll
- Producers: McKeehan, Stevens

TobyMac singles chronology
"One World" (2007)	"Lose My Soul" (2008)	"No Ordinary Love" (2008)

Kirk Franklin singles chronology
"Declaration (This Is It)" (2007)	"Lose My Soul" (2008)	"Jesus" (2008)

Mandisa singles chronology
"Voice of a Savior" (2008)	"Lose My Soul" (2008)	"Angels We Have Heard on High" (2008)

Music video
- "Lose My Soul" on YouTube

"Lose My Soul" is a song by TobyMac from his third studio album, Portable Sounds (2007). It features gospel artist Kirk Franklin and contemporary Christian singer Mandisa and was released in 2008 as the fifth single from the album. The song was written by McKeehan, Christopher Stevens, and Michael Ripoll. "Lose My Soul" didn't become a hit until a year after its release, peaking at No. 2 on both the US Hot Christian Songs chart and the US Hot Christian AC chart. It was ranked the thirteenth most-played song on R&R's Year-End Top Christian CHR Songs chart in 2008.

The song was included on the 2008 compilation, WOW Hits 2009 album.

== Charts ==
=== Weekly charts ===
Chart (2008–10)	Peak position
US Christian Airplay (Billboard)	2
US Hot Christian Songs (Billboard)	2

=== Year-end charts ===
Chart (2008)	Position
US Hot Christian Songs (Billboard)	19

=== Decade-end charts ===
Chart (2000s)	Position
US Hot Christian Songs (Billboard)	29

== Certifications ==
Region	Certification	Certified units/sales
United States (RIAA)	Gold	500,000^{‡}
^{‡} Sales+streaming figures based on certification alone.

== Awards ==
The song was nominated for a Dove Award for Short Form Music Video of the Year at the 41st GMA Dove Awards held on February 18, 2010.
