= Christmas Day (Michael W. Smith song) =

Single by Michael W. Smith and Mandisa

Single by Michael W. Smith featuring Mandisa

from the album It's a Wonderful Christmas
- Released: November 20, 2007
- Recorded: 2007
- Genre: R&B, gospel
- Label: Sparrow
- Songwriters: Michael W. Smith; Wes King; Cindy Morgan
- Producers: Clint Lagerberg; Sam Mizell; Matthew West

Mandisa singles chronology
"Christmas Makes Me Cry" (2007)	"Christmas Day" (2007)	"Voice of a Savior" (2008)

"Christmas Day"

Song by Michael W. Smith featuring Jennifer Nettles

from the album The Spirit of Christmas
- Released: September 30, 2014
- Recorded: 2014
- Genre: R&B, gospel
- Label: Capitol
- Songwriters: Michael W. Smith; Wes King; Cindy Morgan
- Producer: Michael W. Smith

"Christmas Day" is a Christmas song by Michael W. Smith featuring Mandisa, from Smith's third Christmas album, It's a Wonderful Christmas (2007). In 2014 Smith remade this song for his fourth Christmas album The Spirit of Christmas (2014), this time featuring Jennifer Nettles.

== Personnel ==
=== 2007 Credits ===
- Michael W. Smith – vocals, grand piano
- Mandisa – vocals
- David Hamilton – Hammond B3 organ, synthesizer, celeste, choir arrangements
- Adam Lester – electric guitar
- James Gregory – bass
- Paul Leim – drums
- Carl Marsh – orchestra arrangements
- The London Session Orchestra – orchestra
- Children's Choir – choir

=== 2014 Credits ===
- Michael W. Smith – vocals, grand piano
- Jennifer Nettles – vocals
- David Hamilton – synthesizer, orchestra arrangements and conductor
- Mark Baldwin – guitars
- Chris Rodriguez – guitars
- Craig Nelson – bass
- Scott Williamson – drums
- The London Session Orchestra – orchestra
- Nashville Children's Choir – choir
- Kyle Hankins – choir director

== Charts ==
Chart (2007)	Peak position
US Adult Contemporary (Billboard)	18
US Christian Airplay (Billboard)	2
US Hot Christian Songs (Billboard)	2
