= Ronnie Freeman =

American Christian musician

- Born: Ronnie Carroll Freeman Jr. September 24, 1973 (age 53); Montgomery, Alabama, U.S.
- Origin: Nashville, Tennessee, U.S.
- Genre: Contemporary Christian music (CCM)
- Occupations: Singer, songwriter, pianist, worship leader
- Instruments: Vocals, piano
- Years active: 2002–present
- Labels: Rocketown, Koch
- Website: ronniefreemanonline.com

Ronnie Carroll Freeman Jr. (born September 24, 1973) is an American Christian musician, pianist, and worship leader. He has released five studio albums: Ronnie Freeman, God Speaking, Perfect Love, If This Is What It Means, and Paradise.

== Early life and background ==
He was born in Montgomery, Alabama, to Ronnie Sr. and Glenda Freeman. Freeman grew up with two younger brothers, Joseph and Jonathan.

He graduated from Southeastern University in 1995. Following his graduation, he worked as a worship pastor before relocating to Nashville, Tennessee, in 2002 to pursue a professional music career.

== Music career ==
Freeman's music recording career began in 2002 with the release of his self-titled studio album, Ronnie Freeman, on May 21, 2002, under Rocketown Records.

His second studio album, God Speaking, was released on January 8, 2008, through Koch Records.

He released his third studio album, Perfect Love, on June 21, 2011, through Brentwood Benson Records. His fourth album, If This Is What It Means, followed on August 30, 2012, under Elevate Entertainment. His fifth studio album, Paradise, was released on August 15, 2015, through Plaid Sky Records.

== Personal life ==
Freeman has been married to Leslie Rae Perkins since 1996, and together they have three children. Their oldest two are named Hannah and Josiah. The family resides in the San Diego, California, area.

== Discography ==
Studio albums

- Ronnie Freeman (May 21, 2002, Rocketown)
- God Speaking (January 8, 2008, Koch)
- Perfect Love (June 21, 2011, Brentwood Benson)
- If This Is What It Means (August 30, 2012, Elevate)
- Paradise (August 15, 2015, Plaid Sky)
