= Christopher Stevens (musician) =

American musician

Chris Stevens

Background information
- Born: Christopher Edmund Stevens; November 29, 1967 (age 58); Eugene, Oregon
- Origin: Nashville, Tennessee
- Genres: Country, contemporary Christian music
- Occupations: Songwriter; producer; music editor; programmer; music engineer; music mixer; music arranger
- Instruments: Bass; drums; guitar; keyboards; vocals
- Years active: 1995–present
- Website: christopherstevens.com

Christopher Edmund Stevens (born November 29, 1967) is an American record producer, mix-engineer, songwriter and multi-instrumentalist based in Nashville, Tennessee.

== Early and personal life ==
Stevens was born November 29, 1967, in Eugene, Oregon. He graduated from North Eugene High School and studied electronics at Lane Community College. After working as a composer for video games in the 1990s, Stevens eventually relocated to Nashville, Tennessee, to pursue songwriting and record production full-time.

== Credits awards and accomplishments ==
Christopher Stevens has earned five Grammy awards and thirteen GMA Dove awards. He has produced and mixed contemporary Christian music artists TobyMac, and American Idol finalist Mandisa, among others. Stevens has also worked on projects for country artists Blake Shelton and Carrie Underwood. In September 2013 Stevens traveled to Barcelona, Spain, to work with International pop star Shakira on her 2014 studio album, lending his programming talents on several of her songs. He has also contributed his skills on two studio albums, Nothing Left to Lose, and Just Kids, for fellow Oregonian and Universal Republic recording artist Mat Kearney. Stevens also collaborated with world-pop artist Michael Franti and Spearhead for his 2020 Album, "Work Hard and Be Nice". Stevens also co-wrote and produced the title track to Franti's 2025 album "Welcome To The Family".

Stevens has handled production, writing, and mixing for numerous artists under the EMI CMG, Word Records, Provident, INO Records, Gotee Records, and Curb Records labels. He is also credited with programming and keyboards on the Carrie Underwood single "Cowboy Casanova".

In 2010 and 2012, Stevens was honored as BMI's Christian Songwriter of the Year. In 2013 he earned his first Grammy as a producer and mixer on TobyMac's Eye on It. In 2014 Stevens took home two more Grammys for Contemporary Christian Album for Mandisa's Overcomer and Contemporary Christian Song for its title song. In June 2015 he received his third BMI Christian songwriter of the year award. In February 2016, Stevens was awarded his fourth Grammy for production and engineering on Tobymac's This Is Not a Test.

In January 2020 Stevens earned his fifth Grammy award in the roots gospel category for producing Gloria Gaynor's album, Testimony. The album was co-produced with Grammy Winning producer and engineer F. Reid Shippen.

Beginning in 2016 Stevens began focusing on songwriting in the pop and country genres and has had songs recorded by Jason Aldean, Lindsay Ell, David Lee Murphy, Kenny Chesney, Justin Moore, Morgan Wallen Drew Baldridge, Chris Janson, Carrie Underwood, and Cody Johnson. In June 2018, Stevens celebrated his first number one Billboard and Mediabase Country Song with David Lee Murphy's "Everything's Gonna Be Alright", featuring Kenny Chesney. Stevens co-wrote the song with Murphy and Jimmy Yeary, and produced the background track. In March 2025, Stevens celebrated his second number one Billboard and Mediabase Country Song with "I'm Gonna Love You" by Cody Johnson featuring Carrie Underwood. The song remained in the number one position for two consecutive weeks.
