= Catalog Albums =

Weekly albums chart produced by Billboard

Billboard logo since 2013

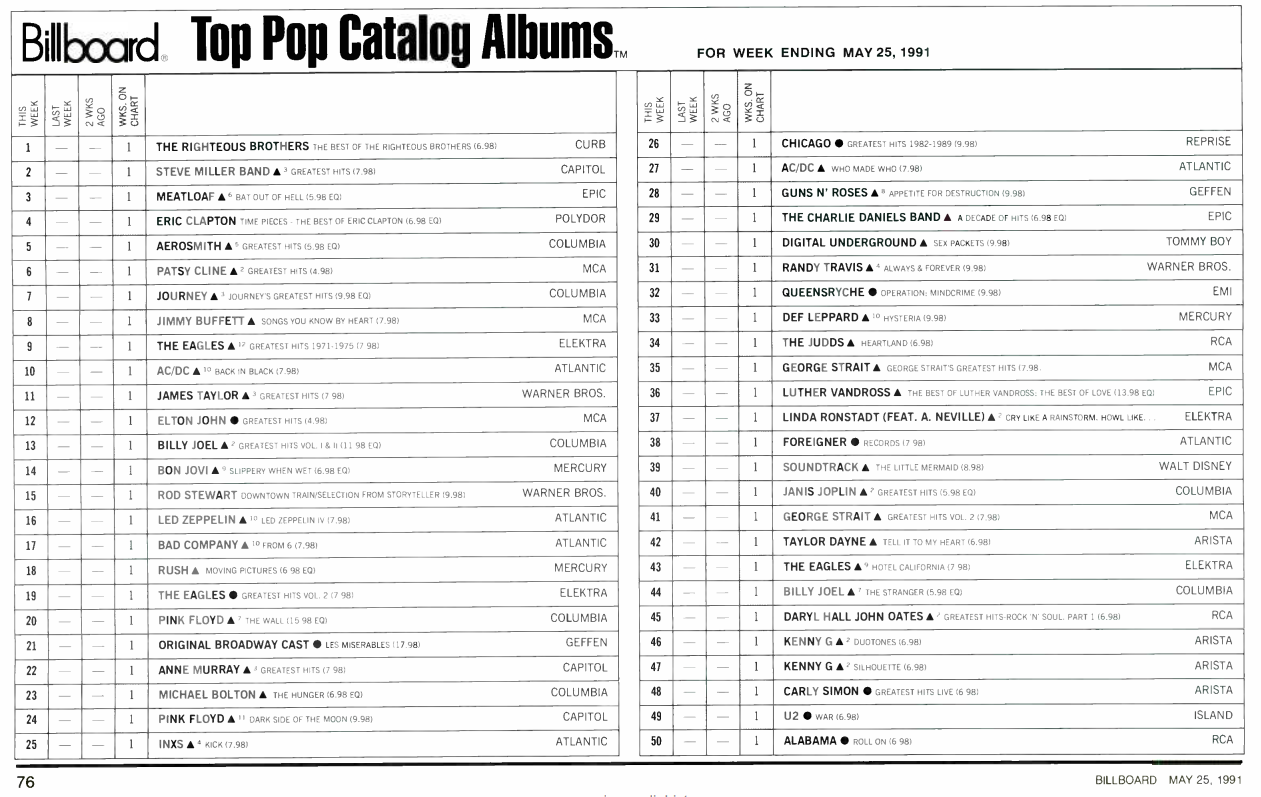
The first release of the Billboard Catalog Albums chart in 1991

Catalog Albums, previously Top Pop Catalog Albums, is a 50-position weekly albums chart produced by Billboard magazine which ranks the best-selling catalog albums in the United States, regardless of genre. Billboard defines a catalog title as one that is more than 18 months old and that has fallen below position 100 on the Billboard 200. Albums meeting these criteria are removed from the Billboard Current Albums ranking and begin a new chart run on the Top Pop Catalog Albums chart. Effectively, the Billboard Current Albums is equivalent to the Billboard 200, with the catalog titles removed.

Top Pop Catalog Albums also contains reissues of older albums. The only exception to the "18 months old" rule pertained to holiday releases (for example, Christmas albums). A "holiday" release was initially eligible for the Billboard 200 only during its initial year of release. After its first year, a holiday-related album appeared on Top Pop Catalog Albums. Many consistent sellers made return trips to the Top Pop Catalog Albums chart each November through January.

A unique feature of the chart is the replacement of the "weeks on chart" column (a standard in Billboard's other charts) with a "total weeks" column, which is a cumulative total of weeks an album spent on both the Billboard 200 and the Top Pop Catalog Albums charts. The "total weeks" longevity record (by a large margin) is held by Pink Floyd's The Dark Side of the Moon, which has a cumulative total of over 1,600 chart weeks (more than 31 years). Its closest competitor is Bob Marley's Legend, at more than 975 weeks.

The issue dated July 11, 2009, was the first time any catalog album outsold the number-one album on the Billboard 200. Three of Michael Jackson's albums (Number Ones, The Essential Michael Jackson and Thriller) claimed positions 1-3 respectively on both the Top Pop Catalog Albums and Top Comprehensive Albums charts in the week following Jackson's death. Additionally, eight of the top nine positions on the chart were owned by Jackson, with a ninth held by a Jackson 5 hits collection.

Starting with the issue dated December 5, 2009, however, the catalog limitations – which removed albums over 18 months old, albums that have dropped below No. 100 and albums that had no currently running singles – for the Billboard 200 were lifted, turning the chart into an all-inclusive list of the 200 highest-selling albums in the country (essentially changing Top Comprehensive Albums into the Billboard 200). A new chart that keeps the previous criteria for the Billboard 200 – dubbed the Top Current Albums chart – was also introduced in the same issue.

== See also ==
- Music catalog
