= Mandisa =

American singer (1976–2024)

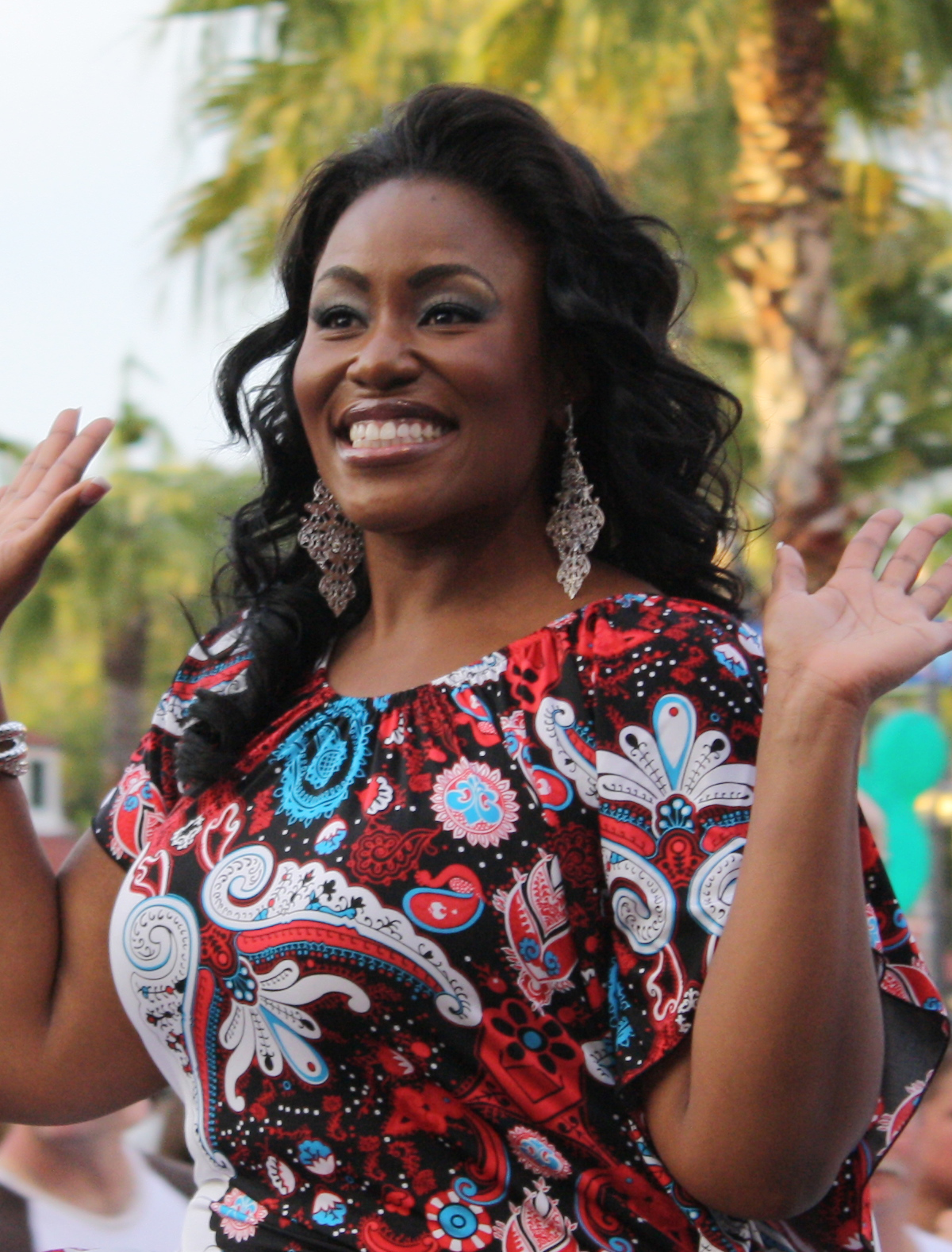
- Mandisa at The American Idol Experience in 2009

Background information
- Born: Mandisa Lynn Hundley; October 2, 1976; Citrus Heights, California, U.S.
- Died: c. April 18, 2024 (aged 47) Franklin, Tennessee, U.S.
- Genres: CCM; gospel; R&B
- Years active: 2004–2024
- Labels: EMI; Sparrow
- Website: mandisaofficial.com

Mandisa Lynn Hundley (/mænˈdiːsə/) (October 2, 1976 – c. April 18, 2024), known mononymously as Mandisa, was an American gospel and contemporary Christian recording artist. She began her solo career as a contestant in the fifth season of American Idol finishing in ninth place. Her album Overcomer won the Grammy Award for Best Contemporary Christian Music Album; she was the fifth American Idol contestant to win a Grammy.

== Early life ==
Mandisa Lynn Hundley was born on October 2, 1976, in Citrus Heights, California to John D. Hundley (b. 1943) and Ruby Jewell (née Berryman; born 1940), where she was also raised. She was the youngest child of four children with two older brothers and one older sister. The Hundley family lived in Citrus Heights during Mandisa's growing up years and she attended school there, graduating from El Camino Fundamental High School in 1994. Following high school, she attended American River College in Sacramento, where she studied vocal jazz. She then transferred to study at Tennessee's Fisk University for vocal performance, and was a member of the school's "Jubilee Singers". Mandisa graduated from Fisk in 2000 with a Bachelor of Arts degree in music.

Before her solo career, Mandisa worked for a short time as a recording session backup singer for artists such as Sandi Patty, Shania Twain, and Trisha Yearwood.

== American Idol ==
In 2005, Mandisa auditioned in Chicago, Illinois for the United States talent competition television show American Idol. After referring to herself as "just Mandisa", she was billed on the show as "Mandisa". When she provided background information to the show's producers, she said that her musical influences were diverse, from Whitney Houston to Def Leppard.

Idol judge Simon Cowell made several comments about Mandisa's weight after her successful audition. He quipped, "Do we have a bigger stage this year?" Then when Paula Abdul commented that Mandisa had a "Frenchie" growl to her voice, Cowell responded that a more apt comparison would be to France itself. The comments and others drew the ire of the National Association to Advance Fat Acceptance, (NAAFA) and was one of the reasons Mandisa entitled her 2007 album, True Beauty.

When Mandisa spoke to the judges just before the season's cut to 24 semi-finalists, she told Cowell: "What I want to say to you is that, yes, you hurt me and I cried and it was painful, it really was. But I want you to know that I've forgiven you and that you don't need someone to apologize in order to forgive somebody. I figure that if Jesus could die so that all of my wrongs could be forgiven, I can certainly extend that same grace to you." Cowell apologized to her immediately, saying that he was "humbled".

On the March 7, 2006, Idol show, she said in her pre-performance video that she sucked her thumb until she was 24 years old. She performed a rendition of Chaka Khan's "I'm Every Woman" which drew praise from all three judges. Mandisa was among the 12 contestants chosen on March 9, 2006, as a finalist in Idol's fifth season. She was eliminated from American Idol on April 5, 2006, in the top nine (she, Paris Bennett, and Elliott Yamin were in the bottom three). None of them had previously been in the bottom three). She, like most of the eliminated contestants, appeared on The Tonight Show with Jay Leno a day later.

=== Performances ===
Week	Theme	Song	Order	Result
Audition	Free Choice	"Fallin'"	N/A	Advanced
Hollywood	Group Performance	"Band of Gold"	N/A	Advanced
Top 24 (12 Women)	Free Choice	"Never"	1	Safe
Top 20 (10 Women)	Free Choice	"Cry"	10	Safe
Top 16 (8 Women)	Free Choice	"I'm Every Woman"	7	Safe
Top 12	Songs of Stevie Wonder	"Don't You Worry 'bout a Thing"	4	Safe
Top 11	Hits of the 1950s	"I Don't Hurt Anymore"	1	Safe
Top 10	21st Century Hits	"Shackles (Praise You)"	5	Safe
Top 9	Country Music	"Any Man of Mine"	2	Eliminated

== Music career ==
On July 27, 2007, after being eliminated from American Idol—Mandisa performed the song "I Don't Hurt Anymore" on the TV talk show Live with Regis and Kelly. She joined Gladys Knight and others at the Apollo Theater for the benefit concert "Back to Harlem," to raise money for various charities. Mandisa was featured alongside Kirk Franklin on tobyMac's song "Lose My Soul" from his album Portable Sounds (2007).

Mandisa's first full-length album True Beauty was released on July 31, 2007. The album debuted at No. 1 on the Top Christian Albums charts, making it the first time a new female artist has debuted at No. 1 in the chart's 27-year history. It also debuted at No. 43 on the Billboard 200, an unusually high debut on that chart for a Christian artist. It also garnered a Best Pop/Contemporary Gospel Album nomination. Showcasing Mandisa's stylistic range was the task set before the five sets of producers who lined up to work with her on the album: Shaun Shankel, Brown Bannister, Christopher Stevens, Drew Ramsey and Shannon Sanders (Drew and Shannon), Robert Marvin, and Josiah Bell. Mandisa personally spent time with the album's writers before the songwriting process began, sharing her vision for the project and what she hoped to communicate through the songs.

Her first single, "Only the World," was released on May 22, 2007. The song had a successful debut on the Billboard Hot Singles Sales chart, which tracks commercial single sales, debuting at No. 2 and reached No. 1 the following week. It is also getting major airplay on Christian radio stations. It was written by Matthew West, Sam Mizell and Clint Lagerberg. (West also co-wrote two other songs on the album.) Her cover of "Shackles" features a horn section provided by LiveHorns.com with Tommy Vaughan on trumpet, Rodney Mills on trombone, and Shane Philen on sax. They also appear on Mandisa's performance of "The Right Thing" on the VeggieTales soundtrack for The Pirates Who Don't Do Anything.

The second single "God Speaking" was released to Christian radio in October 2007. A third single, "Voice of a Savior," written by West, was serviced to Inspo radio in mid-2008, where it peaked in the Top 5 of Radio and Records' Soft AC/Inspo chart.

In November 2007, Mandisa released a holiday EP, Christmas Joy EP, which features the song "Christmas Makes Me Cry", a duet with frequent collaborator Matthew West. Earlier that year, Mandisa also recorded "Christmas Day," a duet with Michael W. Smith. The EP peaked at No. 2 on Billboard's Hot Christian AC chart, stopped from reaching No. 1 by her duet with Smith, "Christmas Day". It was the first time in the history of the Christian singles chart that a solo female artist was featured on the top two singles at the same time. On October 14, 2008, Mandisa released a full-length Christmas album, It's Christmas.

Freedom was released on March 24, 2009. There had also been reports that Mandisa would be releasing "We Are Family" which is a Bonus Track on Napster on April 14, 2009. The song was available for a short time on Amazon.com added to Freedom labeled as "Freedom + Bonus Track". It also debuted at No. 83 on the Billboard 200.

What If We Were Real, was released on April 11, 2011. In March 2011 she began a tour with comedian Anita Renfroe promoting the album. The first single off "What If We Were Real," a track titled "Stronger," peaked at No. 1 on the Billboard Christian Songs chart on June 18, 2011. The album has remained on the Billboard Christian Albums for 76 consecutive weeks as of September 2012. It debuted at No. 66 on the Billboard 200. The second single, "Waiting for Tomorrow," peaked at No. 3 on the Billboard Christian Songs chart the week of January 28, 2012. The third single, "Good Morning", features fellow Contemporary Christian musician tobyMac, with whom Mandisa collaborated on "Lose My Soul".

Mandisa's fourth studio album, Overcomer, was released on August 27, 2013, and debuted at No. 29 on the Billboard 200 Albums Chart, her highest peak on that chart to date. The title track "Overcomer" was released in late July, hitting the Billboard Christian Top 20 in its third week on the charts. It went to No. 1 on that chart by October 2013 when it also appeared on the mainstream Bubbling Under chart.

Mandisa won the Best Contemporary Christian Music Album for Overcomer at the 56th Grammy Awards. The title song from the album also won Best Contemporary Christian Music Song for songwriters David Garcia, Ben Glover, and Christopher Stevens. She declined to attend the Grammy Awards, however, saying, "I have fallen prey to the alluring pull of flesh, pride, and selfish desires quite a bit recently. I knew that submerging myself into an environment that celebrates those things was risky for me at this time.” Her fifth and final album, Out of the Dark, was released on May 19, 2017. The lead single, "Unfinished", was then released on March 10, 2017. The song reached No. 8 on the Billboard Hot Christian Songs Chart. A compilation of her best songs, Overcomer: The Greatest Hits, was released in February 2020.

== Personal life ==
Mandisa lived in Franklin, Tennessee, a Nashville suburb. After her 2006 appearance on American Idol, she worked toward improving her health with a focus on weight loss. In a 2006 interview with The Advocate, she said she had a food addiction. The title of her second album, Freedom, was inspired by her experience of overcoming what she said was an addiction to food. As of March 2009, it was reported that she lost 75 pounds. By February 2011, she reached her goal of losing 100 pounds.

After the loss of a close friend to breast cancer in 2014, Mandisa gained back much of the weight she had originally lost, as well as experiencing depression, anxiety, and thoughts of suicide. The loss of her friend, accompanied by a personal sense of betrayal by God, led her to retreat from the public.

In May 2017, Mandisa returned to the public eye. Speaking openly about her struggle with depression, she appeared on podcasts and wrote a memoir, "Out of the Dark: My Journey Through the Shadows to Find God’s Joy". When she released Out of the Dark in 2017, it was the first album she had recorded in three years.

== Death ==
On April 18, 2024, Mandisa was found dead at her home in Franklin, Tennessee, at the age of 47. The Franklin Police Department announced the following day that they had opened an investigation into her cause of death. At her memorial service, Mandisa's father John Hundley stated she was found unresponsive on the left side of her bed and speculated she had been unable to call for help with her phone on the right side of the bed. On June 4, 2024, it was ruled she died due to complications of class III obesity, with the manner of death listed as natural. She reportedly weighed 488 pounds at the time of her death, and her autopsy report noted that she was last known to have been alive approximately three weeks before she was found dead.

Several music artists and television celebrities including frequent collaborator TobyMac and Matthew West paid tribute to Mandisa after the news of her death was released. American Idol paid tribute to her on the April 29 episode of the show, with Colton Dixon, Danny Gokey, and Melinda Doolittle performing "Shackles (Praise You)".

Funeral services were held at the Bentwood Baptist Church in Nashville.

== Discography ==
Studio albums

- True Beauty (2007)
- It's Christmas (2008)
- Freedom (2009)
- What If We Were Real (2011)
- Overcomer (2013)
- Out of the Dark (2017)

== Awards and nominations ==
=== Grammy Awards ===
Grammy Awards
Year	Category	Work	Result
2008	Best Pop/Contemporary Gospel Album	True Beauty	Nominated
2010	Best Pop/Contemporary Gospel Album	Freedom	Nominated
2012	Best Contemporary Christian Music Album	What If We Were Real	Nominated
2014	Best Contemporary Christian Music Album	Overcomer	Won
2014	Best Gospel/Contemporary Christian Music Performance	"Overcomer"	Nominated

=== GMA Dove Awards ===
Dove Awards
Year	Category	Nominee / Work	Result
2008	New Artist of the Year	Mandisa	Nominated
2008	Female Vocalist of the Year	Mandisa	Nominated
2009	Female Vocalist of the Year	Mandisa	Nominated
2010	Female Vocalist of the Year	Mandisa	Nominated
2010	Pop/Contemporary Recorded Song of the Year	"My Deliverer"	Nominated
2010	Short Form Video of the Year	"Lose My Soul" tobyMac, featuring Kirk Franklin & Mandisa	Nominated
