= Tori Kelly discography =

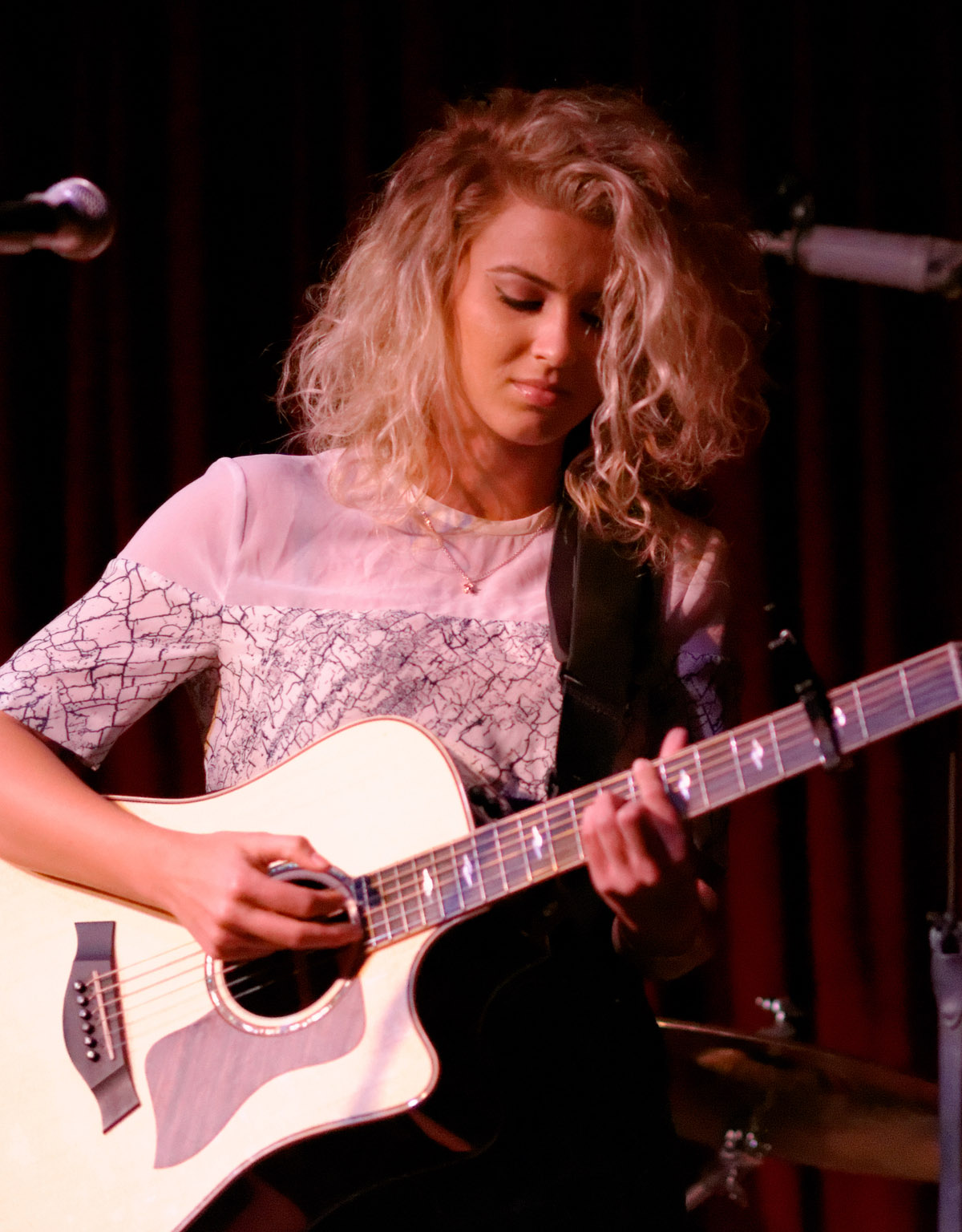
- Kelly in 2015
- Studio albums: 5
- EPs: 4
- Singles: 23
- Featured singles: 13
- Promotional singles: 4
- Music videos: 14

American musician Tori Kelly has released five studio albums, four extended plays, nineteen singles (including six as a featured artist), and two promotional singles. At the age of 16, Kelly auditioned for the ninth season of the singing competition television series American Idol. After being eliminated, Kelly began to independently release music including her debut EP, Handmade Songs by Tori Kelly (2012) which she wrote and produced herself.

After gaining the attention of Scooter Braun who became her manager, she signed to Capitol Records in September of that year. She followed with her second EP Foreword (2013) which marked her first major label release. Her debut album Unbreakable Smile (2015) followed and debuted at number two on the US Billboard 200. The album spawned the single, "Nobody Love" which became her first US Billboard Hot 100 appearance. Other singles which charted from the album included "Should've Been Us" and "Hollow".

In 2018, Kelly released her second studio album Hiding Place (2018) which found critical acclaim, debuted atop the US Billboard Top Gospel Albums chart, and peaked number 35 on the US Billboard 200. The album spawned various singles including "Never Alone" which reached the top of the US Billboard Hot Gospel Songs chart. Her third studio album, Inspired by True Events (2019) followed a year later and reached number 97 on the US Billboard 200. During the COVID-19 pandemic, Kelly released her third EP, Solitude (2020) which spawned the single "Unbothered". In October 2020, she followed with her first Christmas-themed album, A Tori Kelly Christmas (2020) which debuted at number 17 on the Billboard Top Holiday albums and saw her covering various Christmas songs including "Let It Snow!" and "All I Want for Christmas Is You".

After signing with Epic Records in 2023, Kelly released her fourth EP, followed by her fifth studio album Tori (2024). The album was preceded with the 90s music inspired single "Missin U". Kelly has since appeared on both soundtracks for the animated films Sing (2016) and its sequel, Sing 2 (2021). Voicing a role in the films, the soundtracks saw her covering various songs including "Don't You Worry 'bout a Thing" and "I Say a Little Prayer". Throughout her career, she has also collaborated with various artists including JoJo, Kirk Franklin, Pentatonix, Ed Sheeran and Lecrae.

== Studio albums ==
| Title | Album details | Peak chart positions | | | | | | Certifications |
| Title | Album details | US | US Gos. | AUS | CAN | NZ | UK | Certifications |
|---|---|---|---|---|---|---|---|---|
| Unbreakable Smile | Released: June 23, 2015; Formats: CD, LP, digital download; Label: Capitol, Schoolboy | 2 | — | 8 | 3 | 6 | 36 | RIAA: Gold; ARIA: Platinum |
| Hiding Place | Released: September 14, 2018; Formats: CD, digital download; Label: Capitol, Schoolboy | 35 | 1 | — (Note: Hiding Place did not enter the ARIA Albums Chart, but peaked at number 10 on the ARIA Digital Albums Chart.) | — | — | — (Note: Hiding Place did not enter the UK Albums Chart, but peaked at number 44 on the UK Album Downloads Chart.) | |
| Inspired by True Events | Released: August 9, 2019; Formats: CD, LP, digital download; Label: Capitol, Schoolboy | 97 | — | — (Note: Inspired by True Events did not enter the ARIA Albums Chart, but peaked at number 50 on the ARIA Digital Albums Chart.) | — | — | — (Note: Inspired by True Events did not enter the UK Albums Chart, but peaked at number 62 on the UK Album Downloads Chart.) | |
| A Tori Kelly Christmas | Released: October 30, 2020; Formats: CD, LP, digital download; Label: Capitol, Schoolboy | 192 | — | — | — | — | — | |
| Tori | Released: April 5, 2024; Formats: CD, LP, digital download; Label: Tori Kelly Publishing, Epic, Beautiful Mind | — | — | — | — | — | — | |
| God Must Really Love Me | Released: June 12, 2026; Formats: CD, LP, digital download; Label: Tori Kelly Publishing, Epic, Beautiful Mind | — | — | — | — | — | — (Note: God Must Really Love Me did not enter the UK Albums Chart, but peaked at number 10 on the UK Christian & Gospel Albums Chart.) | |
"—" denotes releases that did not chart or were not released in that territory.

== Extended plays ==
| Title | EP details | Peak chart positions | | |
| Title | EP details | US | NZ | UK DL |
|---|---|---|---|---|
| Handmade Songs | Released: May 1, 2012; Format: CD, digital download; Label: Toraay | — (Note: Handmade Songs did not enter the Billboard 200, but peaked at number 9 on the Heatseekers Albums chart.) | — | — |
| Foreword | Released: October 22, 2013; Formats: CD, digital download; Label: Capitol | 16 | 26 | — |
| Solitude | Released: August 14, 2020; Formats: Digital download; Label: Capitol | — (Note: Solitude did not enter the Billboard 200, but peaked at number 60 on the Current Album Sales chart.) | — | — |
| Tori | Released: July 28, 2023; Formats: Digital download; Label: Tori Kelly Publishing, Epic, Beautiful Mind | — (Note: Tori did not enter the Billboard 200, but peaked at number 71 on the Current Album Sales chart.) | — | 90 |
"—" denotes releases that did not chart or were not released in that territory.

== Singles ==
=== As lead artist ===
| Title | Year | Peak chart positions | | | | | | | | Certifications | Album |
| Title | Year | US | US Pop | US Adult | US Gos. | AUS | CAN | NZ | UK | Certifications | Album |
|---|---|---|---|---|---|---|---|---|---|---|---|
| "Mr. Music" | 2011 | — | — | — | — | — | — | — | — | | Non-album singles |
| "Bring Me Home" | 2011 | — | — | — | — | — | — | — | — | | Non-album singles |
| "Confetti" | 2012 | — | — | — | — | — | — | — | — | | Handmade Songs |
| "Fill a Heart (Child Hunger Ends Here)" | 2013 | — | — | — | — | — | — | — | — | | Non-album single |
| "Dear No One" | 2013 | — | — | — | — | — | — | — | — | RMNZ: Gold | Foreword |
| "Nobody Love" | 2015 | 60 | 16 | 35 | — | 21 | 36 | 5 | — | ARIA: Gold; RIAA: Gold; RMNZ: Platinum | Unbreakable Smile |
| "Should've Been Us" (solo or featuring Jeremih) | 2015 | 51 | 16 | 30 | — | 91 | 64 | — | 111 | RIAA: Platinum; RMNZ: Gold | Unbreakable Smile |
| "Hollow" | 2015 | 68 | 22 | — | — | — | 87 | — | — | RIAA: Platinum | Unbreakable Smile |
| "Help Us to Love" (featuring The HamilTones) | 2018 | — | — | — | 4 | — | — | — | — | | Hiding Place |
| "Never Alone" (featuring Kirk Franklin) | 2018 | — | — | — | 1 | — | — | — (Note: "Never Alone" did not enter the NZ Top 40 Singles Chart, but peaked at number 34 on the NZ Hot Singles Chart.) | — | | Hiding Place |
| "Change Your Mind" | 2019 | — | — | — | — | — | — | — | — | | Inspired by True Events |
| "Sorry Would Go a Long Way" | 2019 | — | — | — | — | — | — | — | — | | Inspired by True Events |
| "Language" | 2019 | — | — | — | — | — | — | — | — | | Inspired by True Events |
| "Time Flies" | 2020 | — | — | — | — | — | — | — | — | | Solitude |
| "Unbothered" | 2020 | — | — | — | — | — | — | — (Note: "Unbothered" did not enter the NZ Top 40 Singles Chart, but peaked at number 33 on the NZ Hot Singles Chart.) | — | | Solitude |
| "Missin U" | 2023 | — | — | — | — | — | — | — (Note: "Missin U" did not enter the NZ Top 40 Singles Chart, but peaked at number 21 on the NZ Hot Singles Chart.) | — | | Tori. |
| "Cut" | 2023 | — | — | — | — | — | — | — | — | | Tori. |
| "Young Gun" (featuring Jon Bellion) | 2023 | — | — | — | — | — | — | — | — | | Tori. |
| "High Water" | 2024 | — | — | — | — | — | — | — | — | | Tori. |
| "Thing U Do" | 2024 | — | — | — | — | — | — | — | — | | Tori. |
| "Bottomline" (featuring JoJo) | 2024 | — | — | — | — | — | — | — | — | | Tori. |
| "This is What Floating Feels Like" (with Jvke) | 2025 | — | — | — | — | — | — | — | — | | Non-album singles |
| "Make a Baby" (featuring Lucky Daye) | 2025 | — | — | — | — | — | — | — | — | | Non-album singles |
| "Control" | 2026 | — | — | — | — (Note: "Control" did not enter the Billboard Hot Gospel Songs chart, but peaked at number 38 on the Hot Christian Songs chart.) | — | — | — (Note: "Control" did not enter the NZ Top 40 Singles Chart, but peaked at number 22 on the Radioscope NZ Most Added Chart.) | — | | God Must Really Love Me |
| "Dive" | 2026 | — | — | — | — | — | — | — | — | | God Must Really Love Me |
"—" denotes releases that did not chart or were not released in that territory.

=== As featured artist ===
| Title | Year | Peak chart positions | | | | | | | Certifications | Album |
| Title | Year | US | US Christ. | US Christ. Air. | AUS Christ. | IRE | SCO | UK | Certifications | Album |
|---|---|---|---|---|---|---|---|---|---|---|
| "Magnetic" (Traphik featuring Tori Kelly) | 2012 | — | — | — | — | — | — | — | | Cruise Control |
| "Lullaby" (Professor Green featuring Tori Kelly) | 2014 | — | — | — | — | 58 | 4 | 4 | BPI: Gold | Growing Up in Public |
| "I'll Find You" (Lecrae featuring Tori Kelly) | 2017 | — (Note: "I'll Find You" did not enter the Billboard Hot 100, but peaked at number 15 on the Bubbling Under Hot 100 Singles chart.) | — | — | — | — | — | — | RIAA: Platinum | All Things Work Together |
| "Take Back Home Girl" (Chris Lane featuring Tori Kelly) | 2017 | 55 | — | — | — | — | — | — | RIAA: 2× Platinum | Laps Around the Sun |
| "Reckless Love" (Cory Asbury featuring Tori Kelly) | 2020 | — | — | — | — | — | — | — | | Non-album single |
| "Together" (for KING & COUNTRY featuring Tori Kelly and Kirk Franklin) | 2020 | — | — | — | — | — | — | — | RIAA: Gold | Burn the Ships (Deluxe Edition: Remixes & Collaborations) |
| "Running Outta Love" (Jacob Collier featuring Tori Kelly) | 2020 | — | — | — | — | — | — | — | | Djesse Vol. 3 |
| "Name" (Justin Bieber featuring Tori Kelly) | 2021 | — | — | — | — | — | — | — | | Justice |
| "Blame Myself" (Illenium featuring Tori Kelly) | 2021 | — | — | — | — | — | — | — | | Fallen Embers |
| "SING" (Jon Batiste featuring Tori Kelly) | 2021 | — | — | — | ― | — | — | — | | We Are (Deluxe) |
| "Still Life" (Brasstracks featuring Tori Kelly) | 2021 | — | — | — | — | — | — | — | | Welcome Back Era |
| "Real Thing" (Pink Sweats featuring Tori Kelly) | 2022 | — | — | — | — | — | — | — | | Pink Moon |
| "Bridge over Troubled Water" (Jacob Collier featuring John Legend and Tori Kelly) | 2024 | — | — | — | — | — | — | — | | Djesse Vol. 4 |
| "A Million Chances" (Jamie MacDonald featuring Tori Kelly) | 2026 | — | 12 | 21 | 28 | — | — | — | | Jamie MacDonald |
"—" denotes releases that did not chart or were not released in that territory.

=== Promotional singles ===
List of promotional singles
| Title | Year | Album |
|---|---|---|
| "Unbreakable Smile" | 2015 | Unbreakable Smile |
| "2 Places" | 2019 | Inspired By True Events |
| "Angels We Have Heard on High" | 2019 | Non-album promotional single |
| "Let It Snow" | 2020 | A Tori Kelly Christmas |

== Other charted songs ==
| Title | Year | Peak chart positions | | | | | | Certifications | Album |
| Title | Year | US Bub. | US Gos. | CAN | NZ | SCO | UK | Certifications | Album |
|---|---|---|---|---|---|---|---|---|---|
| "I Was Made for Loving You" (featuring Ed Sheeran) | 2015 | 10 | — | 64 | 21 | 50 | 142 | RIAA: Gold; RMNZ: 2× Platinum | Unbreakable Smile |
| "Masterpiece" (featuring Lecrae) | 2018 | — | 13 | — | — | — | — | | Hiding Place |
| "Sunday" | 2018 | — | 15 | — | — | — | — | | Hiding Place |
| "Just as Sure" (featuring Jonathan McReynolds) | 2018 | — | 11 | — | — | — | — | | Hiding Place |
| "Psalm 42" | 2018 | — | 3 | — | — | — | — | | Hiding Place |
| "Questions" | 2018 | — | 18 | — | — | — | — | | Hiding Place |
| "Soul's Anthem (It Is Well)" | 2018 | — | 12 | — | — | — | — | | Hiding Place |
| "25th" | 2020 | — | — | — | — (Note: "25th" did not enter the NZ Top 40 Singles Chart, but peaked at number 35 on the NZ Hot Singles Chart.) | — | — | | A Tori Kelly Christmas |
| "Where Do I Fit In" (Justin Bieber featuring Tori Kelly, Chandler Moore and Judah Smith) | 2021 | — | — | — | — (Note: "Where Do I Fit In" did not enter the NZ Top 40 Singles Chart, but peaked at number 28 on the NZ Hot Singles Chart.) | — | — | | Freedom |
| "Miracle Worker" (with Forrest Frank) | 2024 | — (Note: "Miracle Worker" did not enter the Billboard Hot 100, but peaked at number 18 on the Billboard Hot Christian Songs) | — | — | — | — | — | | Child of God |
| "Name of Jesus" | 2026 | — | 20 | — | — | — | — | | God Must Really Love Me |
"—" denotes releases that did not chart or were not released in that territory.

== Guest appearances ==
| Title | Year | Other artist(s) | Album |
|---|---|---|---|
| "This Ain't the Way" | 2011 | Jeremy Passion | For More Than a Feeling |
| "Mess We've Made" | 2011 | AJ Rafael | Red Roses |
| "Silent" | 2014 | —N/a | The Giver |
| "Winter Wonderland" / "Don't Worry Be Happy" | 2014 | Pentatonix | That's Christmas to Me |
| "Colors of the Wind" | 2015 | —N/a | We Love Disney |
| "Favorite Time of Year" | 2015 | India.Arie | Christmas with Friends |
| "Baby Baby" | 2016 | Amy Grant | Heart in Motion |
| "Die a Happy Man" (The Remix) | 2016 | Thomas Rhett | Tangled Up (Deluxe edition) |
| "Where's the Love?" | 2016 | The Black Eyed Peas and The World | Non-album single |
| "Hallelujah" | 2016 | —N/a | Sing: Original Motion Picture Soundtrack |
| "Don't You Worry 'Bout A Thing" | 2016 | —N/a | Sing: Original Motion Picture Soundtrack |
| "I'll Find You" | 2017 | Lecrae | All Things Work Together |
| "Take Back Home Girl" | 2018 | Chris Lane | Laps Around the Sun |
| "Running Outta Love" | 2020 | Jacob Collier | Djesse Vol. 3 |
| "(You Make Me Feel Like) A Natural Woman" | 2020 | JoJo | Stand Up |
| "Name" | 2021 | Justin Bieber | Justice (Triple Chux Delexue) |
| "Where Do I Fit In" | 2021 | Justin Bieber, Chandler Moore, Judah Smith | Freedom |
| "Blame Myself" | 2021 | Illenium | Fallen Embers |
| "Waving Through A Window" | 2021 | —N/a | Dear Evan Hansen: Original Motion Picture Soundtrack |
| "SING" | 2021 | Jon Batiste | We Are (The Deluxe Edition) |
| "Still Life" | 2021 | Brasstracks | Welcome Back Era |
| "Let's Go Crazy" | 2021 | Taron Egerton, Reese Witherspoon, Nick Kroll | Sing 2 (Original Motion Picture Soundtrack) |
| "Where The Streets Have No Name" | 2021 | Taron Egerton, Reese Witherspoon, Scarlett Johansson, Nick Kroll | Sing 2 (Original Motion Picture Soundtrack) |
| "There's Nothing Holdin' Me Back" | 2021 | Taron Egerton | Sing 2 (Original Motion Picture Soundtrack) |
| "I Say A Little Prayer" | 2021 | Pharrell Williams | Sing 2 (Original Motion Picture Soundtrack) |
| "Christmas (Baby Please Come Home)" | 2021 | Keke Palmer, Scarlett Johansson, Taron Egerton, Reese Witherspoon | Sing 2 (Original Motion Picture Soundtrack) |
| "Real Thing" | 2022 | Pink Sweat$ | Pink Moon |
| "She Was Here" | 2022 | Crystal Lewis | Together We Can |
| "Again" | 2023 | Kirk Franklin, Chandler Moore, Jonathan McReynolds, Jekalyn Carr | Father's Day |
| "Bridge over Troubled Water" | 2024 | Jacob Collier, John Legend | Djesse Vol. 4 |
| "Miracle Worker" | 2024 | Forrest Frank | Child of God |
| "Every Lifetime" | 2024 | Jamie Miller | Long Way Home |
| "I've Got A Story" | 2025 | NEEDTOBREATHE | House of David |
| "ANYWHERE" | 2025 | Voices of Fire, Pharrell Williams | OPHANIM |
| "Mourning 2 Dancing" | 2026 | Tenroc, Jon Keith | TBA |
