= List of songs recorded by Tori Kelly =

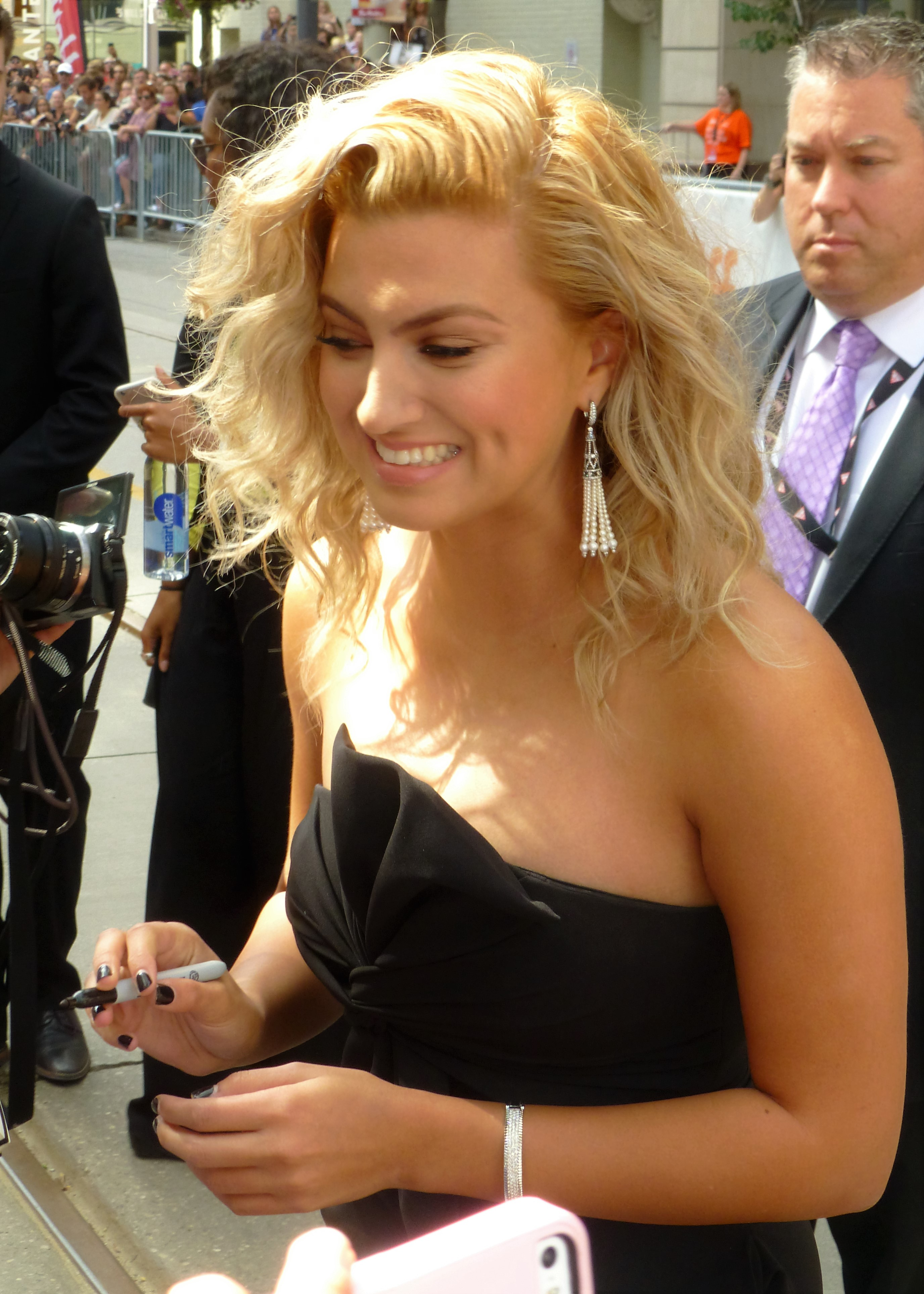
Kelly at the 2016 Toronto International Film Festival promoting Sing

Tori Kelly is an American singer-songwriter who slowly gained recognition after starting to post videos on YouTube at the age of 14. When she was 16, Kelly auditioned for the singing competition television series American Idol. After being eliminated from the show, Kelly began to work on her own music. In 2012, she independently released her first EP that she produced, wrote, and mixed herself, titled Handmade Songs By Tori Kelly. The following year, Scooter Braun became her manager after seeing her videos on YouTube and introduced her to Capitol Records, with whom she signed in September. Kelly's second EP Foreword came out in October 2013 as her first major label release. On June 23, 2015, Kelly's debut album, Unbreakable Smile, was released. The lead single, "Nobody Love", was released in the spring and became her first US Billboard Hot 100 appearance. Kelly was nominated for Best New Artist at the 58th Grammy Awards. She voiced a shy teenage elephant named Meena in the 2016 movie, Sing.

Her second studio album Hiding Place (2018) peaked at number 35 on the Billboard 200 chart and received two Grammy Awards, for Best Gospel Album and Best Gospel Performance/Song, respectively. In 2019, Kelly released her third studio album Inspired by True Events and her fourth, A Tori Kelly Christmas, in 2020. Her fifth, Tori., was released in 2024.

== Released songs ==
Key
†	Indicates single release
‡	Indicates song included on an alternative version of the album
•	Indicates song written solely by Tori Kelly

Title	Artist(s)	Writer(s)	Album	Year	Ref
"25th"	Tori Kelly	Tori Kelly; Wendy Wang; Casey Cathleen Smith	A Tori Kelly Christmas	2020	
"2 Places"	Tori Kelly	Tori Kelly; Taylor Parks; Nathaniel Campany; Noel Zancanella	Inspired by True Events	2019	
"Actress"	Tori Kelly	Tori Kelly •	Inspired by True Events	2019	
"All in my Head"	Tori Kelly	Tori Kelly •	Handmade Songs by Tori Kelly	2012	
"All I Want (from the Netflix Series "Bridgerton")"	Tori Kelly	Rogét Chahayed; Wesley Singerman; Taylor Dexter; Nicole Cohen	Non-album single	2024	
"All I Want for Christmas Is You"	Tori Kelly	Mariah Carey; Walter Afanasieff	A Tori Kelly Christmas ‡	2020	
"Anyway"	Tori Kelly	Tori Kelly; Claude Kelly; Chuck Harmony	Unbreakable Smile	2015	
"Art of Letting You Go"	Tori Kelly	Tori Kelly; Oren Yoel	Unbreakable Smile	2015	
"Baby Baby" †	Amy Grant featuring Tori Kelly	Keith Thomas; Amy Grant	Non-album single	2016	
"Beautiful Things"	Tori Kelly	Tori Kelly; Chuck Harmony	Unbreakable Smile ‡	2015	
"Before The Dawn"	Tori Kelly	Tori Kelly; Benjamin Edwards; James Napier	Inspired by True Events	2019	
"Blink of an Eye"	Tori Kelly	Tori Kelly; Zac Poor	Non-album single	2016	
"Bottled Up"	Tori Kelly	Tori Kelly; Jenna Andrews	Unbreakable Smile ‡	2015	
"Bring Me Home" †	Tori Kelly	Tori Kelly •	Non-album single	2011	
"California Lovers"	Tori Kelly featuring LL Cool J	Tori Kelly; Max Martin; Savan Kotecha; Rickard Göransson; Ali Payami; James Todd Smith	Unbreakable Smile	2015	
"Celestial"	Tori Kelly	Tori Kelly •	Handmade Songs by Tori Kelly	2012	
"Change Your Mind"	Tori Kelly	Tori Kelly; James Napier	Inspired by True Events	2019	
"Christmas Time Is Here"	Tori Kelly	Vince Guaraldi; Lee Mendelson	A Tori Kelly Christmas	2020	
"City Dove"	Tori Kelly	Tori Kelly; Ilya Salmanzadeh; Laleh Pourkarim	Unbreakable Smile	2015	
"Coffee"	Tori Kelly	Tori Kelly; Taylor Parks; Nathaniel Campany; James Napier	Inspired by True Events	2019	
"Colors of the Wind"	Tori Kelly	Alan Menken	We Love Disney	2015	
"Confetti" †	Tori Kelly	Tori Kelly •	Handmade Songs by Tori Kelly	2012	
"Daydream"	Tori Kelly	Tori Kelly •	Foreword - EP	2013	
"Dear No One" †	Tori Kelly	Tori Kelly •	Foreword - EP	2013	
"Don't You Worry 'bout a Thing"	Tori Kelly	Stevie Wonder	Sing – Original Motion Picture Soundtrack	2016	
"Elf Interlude"	Tori Kelly	John Debney	A Tori Kelly Christmas	2020	
"Expensive"	Tori Kelly featuring Daye Jack	Tori Kelly; Savan Kotecha; Alexander Kronlund; Joleen Belle; Lukas Loules; Tash; Daye Jack	Unbreakable Smile	2015	
"Eyelashes"	Tori Kelly	Tori Kelly •	Handmade Songs by Tori Kelly	2012	
"Falling Slow"	Tori Kelly	Tori Kelly; Johan Carlsson; Max Martin	Unbreakable Smile	2015	
"Favorite Time of Year"	India Arie featuring Tori Kelly	—	Christmas with Friends	2015	
"Fill a Heart (Child Hunger Ends Here)" †	Tori Kelly	—	Non-album single	2013	
"First Heartbreak"	Tori Kelly	Tori Kelly; Toby Gad	Unbreakable Smile	2015	
"Hallelujah"	Tori Kelly	Leonard Cohen	Sing – Original Motion Picture Soundtrack	2016	
"Help Us To Love"	Tori Kelly featuring The HamilTones	Kirk Franklin	Hiding Place	2018	
"I'll Find You"	Lecrae featuring Tori Kelly	Johnny Yukon; DJ Frank E Danny Majic; Sasha Sloan; Natalie Lauren; Tori Kelly; Lecrae	All Things Work Together	2017	
"I Was Made For Loving You"	Tori Kelly featuring Ed Sheeran	Tori Kelly; Ed Sheeran	Unbreakable Smile	2015	
"Just As Sure"	Tori Kelly featuring Jonathan McReynolds	Kirk Franklin	Hiding Place	2018	
"Kid I Used To Know"	Tori Kelly	Tori Kelly; Ashley Gorley; Mike Elizondo	Inspired by True Events	2019	
"Language"	Tori Kelly	Tori Kelly; Justin Tranter; Audra Mae	Inspired by True Events	2019	
"Lullaby" †	Professor Green featuring Tori Kelly	Stephen Manderson; Chris Crowhurst; Ina Wroldsen	Growing Up in Public	2014	
"Masterpiece"	Tori Kelly featuring Lecrae	Kirk Franklin; Lecrae	Hiding Place	2018	
"Minute To Myself"	Tori Kelly	Tori Kelly; James Napier; Benjamin Jones	Inspired by True Events ‡	2019	
Move like a emu	Tori Kelly	Tori Kelly; Clyde Lawrence; Jordan Cohen; Jason Cornet; Jonathan Bellion; Craig David; Mark Hill	Tori	2002 2006 2024	
"Mr. Music" †	Tori Kelly	Tori Kelly •	Non-album single	2011	
"Never Alone"	Tori Kelly featuring Kirk Franklin	Tori Kelly; Kirk Franklin	Hiding Place	2018	
"Nobody Love" †	Tori Kelly	Tori Kelly; Max Martin; Savan Kotecha; Rickard Göransson	Unbreakable Smile	2015	
"Paper Hearts"	Tori Kelly	Tori Kelly •	Foreword - EP	2013	
"Personal"	Tori Kelly	Tori Kelly; Claude Kelly; Chuck Harmony	Unbreakable Smile ‡	2015	
"Pretty Fades"	Tori Kelly	Tori Kelly; Hayley Warner; Britten Newbill	Inspired by True Events	2019	
"Psalm 42"	Tori Kelly	Tori Kelly; Kirk Franklin	Hiding Place	2018	
"Questions"	Tori Kelly	Kirk Franklin	Hiding Place	2018	
"Rocket"	Tori Kelly	Tori Kelly •	Foreword - EP	2013	
"Silent"	Tori Kelly	—	The Giver – Original Motion Picture Soundtrack	2014	
"Should've Been Us" †	Tori Kelly	Tori Kelly; Max Martin; Savan Kotecha; Rickard Göransson	Unbreakable Smile	2015	
"Something Beautiful"	Tori Kelly	Tori Kelly; Justin Franks; Jacob Luttrell; Jeanette Steiner	Unbreakable Smile ‡	2016	
"Sorry Would Go A Long Way"	Tori Kelly	Tori Kelly; Benjamin Edwards; James Napier	Inspired by True Events	2019	
"Soul’s Anthem (It Is Well)"	Tori Kelly	Tori Kelly; Kirk Franklin	Hiding Place	2018	
there nothing home me back	Taron Esteron & tori Kelly				
"Stained"	Tori Kelly	Tori Kelly •	Handmade Songs by Tori Kelly	2012	
"Sunday"	Tori Kelly	Tori Kelly; Kirk Franklin	Hiding Place	2018	
"Take Back Home Girl"	Chris Lane featuring Tori Kelly	Josh Miller; Hillary Lindsey; David Garcia	Laps Around the Sun	2017	
"Talk"	Tori Kelly	Tori Kelly; James Ryan Ho	Unbreakable Smile	2015	
"The Lie"	Tori Kelly	Tori Kelly; Dante Jones; Drew Love	Inspired by True Events	2019	
"Treasure"	Tori Kelly	Tori Kelly •	Foreword - EP	2013	
"Unbreakable Smile"	Tori Kelly	Tori Kelly •	Unbreakable Smile	2015	
"Until Forever"	Tori Kelly	Tori Kelly; James Napier; Benjamin Jones	Inspired by True Events ‡	2019	
"Until I Think Of You"	Tori Kelly	Tori Kelly; James Napier	Inspired by True Events	2019	
"Upside Down"	Tori Kelly	Tori Kelly •	Handmade Songs by Tori Kelly	2012	
"Where I Belong"	Tori Kelly	Tori Kelly; Claude Kelly	Unbreakable Smile	2015	
"Where Is the Love?" †	Black Eyed Peas featuring Various Artists	William Adams; Allan Lindo; Jaime Gomez; Justin Timberlake; Jayceon Taylor; Rakim Mayers; Khaled Khaled; Giorgio Tuinfort	Non-album single	2016	
"Winter Wonderland" / "Don't Worry Be Happy"	Pentatonix featuring Tori Kelly	Felix Bernard; Bobby McFerrin	That's Christmas to Me	2014	
"Your Words"	Tori Kelly	Tori Kelly; James Napier	Inspired by True Events	2019	
