= God Must Really Love Me (album) =

Studio album by Tori Kelly
- Released: June 12, 2026
- Recorded: January 2026
- Genres: Pop; R&B; gospel
- Length: 41:13
- Labels: Epic, Beautiful Mind
- Producers: Tori Kelly; Tommy King; Ammo; Dan Farber; Tenroc; Jason Gill; Oskar Widen; Sol Was; Jeff Gitelman; Forrest Frank

Tori Kelly chronology
Tori (2024)	God Must Really Love Me (2026)

Singles from God Must Really Love Me
- 1. "Control" Released: May 8, 2026; 2. "Dive" Released: May 8, 2026

God Must Really Love Me is the sixth studio album by the American singer-songwriter Tori Kelly. It was released on June 12, 2026, via Epic Records, to CD, LP, digital download, and streaming formats. The album's fourteen tracks were produced by Kelly alongside Tommy King, Ammo, Dan Farber, Tenroc, Jason Gill, Oskar Widen, Sol Was, Jeff Gitelman, and Forrest Frank. God Must Really Love Me was supported with the release of two singles, including "Control" and "Dive", which were both released concurrently on May 8, 2026. The former of which peaked at number 38 on the Billboard Hot Christian Songs chart. God Must Really Love Me is characteristic for its thematic references to the blessings Kelly has experienced in her life, and the gratitude she has for her recently born son Zayden.

== Release and promotion ==
God Must Really Love Me was announced on May 5, 2026, when Kelly revealed the album cover and release date in an Instagram post. It was also announced that two tracks from the album, "Control" and "Dive", would both be released as singles on May 8, 2026. Upon release, "Dive" was supported with the release of a music video, which was uploaded to YouTube. In promotion of the album's release, Kelly would tour alongside Forrest Frank, Cory Asbury, and the Figs in the highly successful Jesus Generation Tour, which would reach twenty-nine dates in the United States and last from June until August 2026. The tour later went on to become the most successful tour of Christian music to date. In September 2026, Kelly promoted God Must Really Love Me by performing selections from the album for NPR's Tiny Desk Concerts series.

== Development ==
Kelly began developing the album while touring with Ed Sheeran in the summer of 2025; along the tour's routes she would book studios when finding an opportunity and record demos for the album. Following the completion of the tour, the majority of God Must Really Love Me was recorded in Los Angeles, California over a two-week period in January 2026. Kelly had recently given birth to her son Zayden; as a result of holding him on her lap while recording, he is occasionally heard on the album. Creation of the album took a significantly short amount of time; previous releases of Kelly's often took years to develop.

== Style and production ==
A pop, R&B, and gospel album with soul and acoustic influences, God Must Really Love Me contains a much more restrained style than Kelly's previous works so as to "[allow] the message of the songs to ring out more clearly". It was for this reason that Kelly described the release as a "slow-down type of album". With the album, Kelly wanted to create a record containing more soul influences and more live instrumentation than previous albums. The album has been noted for its "warm low end" style, while being "small, contained, and quiet" and maintaining a "rounded, modern-pop beat".

== Lyrics and meaning ==
In the process of developing content for God Must Really Love Me, Kelly attempted a "write-what-you-know" approach, with the goal to cover the topics of her faith, marriage, and motherhood. Kelly believed that, at the time of creating the album, she had been experiencing "contentment that she's never before experienced", which resulted in many of the album's songs to contain emotions of gratitude. It was also because of this that that the album was named God Must Really Love Me, which was intended as a nod to the idea that God has rewarded Kelly with many blessings. Billboard wrote that the album explores topics of "love, identity and 'the quiet work of protecting your peace amid the constant noise of the outside world.'" Much of the album was inspired by the birth of Zayden. Kelly has also noted that the album's are more personal than earlier releases, citing the track "Bird" specifically "one of the more vulnerable songs I've ever written".

Kelly explained the idea behind the song's writing, saying that she "really challenged myself to peel back the layers and go much deeper with my lyrics"; previously she had "held back from getting too specific in my songs" but with God Must Really Love Me Kelly "just completely let go". Much of the album also contains references to Christianity, in an attempt for Kelly to "incorporate singing about God and how He's been in my life".

== Reception ==
Professional ratings
Review scores
Source	Rating
Eulalie Magazine	4/5 stars
Jubilee Cast	4.25/5 stars
Shatter the Standards	3.5/5 stars

=== Critical ===
God Must Really Love Me received generally positive reception from critical audiences. Writing for Jubilee Cast, Timothy Yap rated the album with a score of 4.25-out-of-5, praising that the record "feels deeply intimate while remaining broadly relatable". Yap also appreciated the "warmth and intimacy" of the album's production style; however, he criticized that its "reflective tone occasionally works against its momentum" due to causing tracks to "blur together". Writing for Shatter the Standards, Charlotte Rochel rated the album 3.5-out-of-5, describing the release as "warm low end, drums drawn back from any rigid pocket, stacked background parts that cite gospel without taking each song all the way into worship". She observed that Kelly's vocals are "dancing on top of the rhythm, not cutting through it", although also found fault in the album's tendency to remain consistent.

=== Commercial ===
God Must Really Love Me contained two charted songs. "Control" peaked at number 38 on the Billboard Hot Christian Songs chart, while "Name of Jesus" peaked at number 20 on the Billboard Hot Gospel Songs chart.

== Track listing ==
God Must Really Love Me track listing
No.	Title	Writer(s)	Producer(s)	Length
1.	"God Must Really Love Me" (intro)	Tori Kelly; Ammo; Feli Ferraro; Isabelle Zikai Gbotto Carlsson	Kelly; Tommy King; Ammo	1:05
2.	"Without You"	Kelly; Dan Farber; Darius Dixson; Akil King	Kelly; Farber	3:22
3.	"Control"	Kelly; King; Taylor Hill	Kelly; King; Farber^{[a]}	2:32
4.	"Fly"	Kelly; Farber; James Abrahart; Andrew Neely; PJ Morton	Kelly; Farber	3:07
5.	"Pray for You"	Kelly; King; Carlsson	Kelly; King; Tenroc^{[a]}	3:46
6.	"Dive"	Kelly; Jason Gill; Oskar Widen; Carlsson	Kelly; Gill; Widen	3:03
7.	"Bird"	Kelly; Sol Was; Casey Smith	Kelly; Was	2:36
8.	"Hurts So Good"	Kelly; Jeff Gitelman; Nija Charles	Kelly; Gitelman	3:18
9.	"Too Much"	Kelly; Farber; Annika Bennett	Kelly; Farber	3:10
10.	"Mine"	Kelly; Farber; Charles	Kelly; Farber	3:34
11.	"Tokyo"	Kelly; Jason Cornet; James Essien	Kelly; Tenroc	2:48
12.	"Smooth Landing"	Kelly; King; Emily Warren; Chloe George	Kelly; King	2:44
13.	"Name of Jesus"	Kelly; Forrest Frank	Kelly; Frank; King; Farber	3:06
14.	"Bliss"	Kelly; King; Amanda Renee Ibanez; Hill	Kelly; King	2:55
Total length:				41:13

God Must Really Love Me — Apple Music bonus content
No.	Title	Length
15.	"Psalm 46:10" (video)	0:23
Total length:		41:36

=== Notes ===
- ^{^[a]} indicates an additional producer.

== Personnel ==
Credits adapted from Apple Music.

=== Musicians ===
- Aaron Wing – electric guitar (3), guitar (5, 14)
- Abe Rounds – drums (3–4, 10, 12, 14), percussion (4)
- Dan Farber – acoustic guitar (2, 9–10), bass (2), background vocals (2, 4), congas (2), drums (4, 9), electric guitar (2, 4, 9–10, 13), glockenspiel (2), keyboards (2, 4, 9–10), percussion (2, 10), piano (9), programming (2–4, 9–10, 13), synthesizer (2)
- Daniel Rhine – programming (13)
- Davy Nathan – mellotron (10), piano (10)
- Dixson – background vocals (2)
- Drew Love – background vocals (4)
- Eli Koskoff – guitar (7)
- Fresh – background vocals (2)
- Forrest Frank – acoustic guitar (13), background vocals (13), programming (13)
- Glitterpartyyy – drums (13)
- J. Hart – background vocals (4)
- Jaden Gray – background vocals (1, 13)
- Jason Gill – bass (6), guitar (6), programming (6), synthesizer (6)
- Jeff "Gitty" Gitelman – programming (8)
- Oskar Widen – bass (6) guitar (6), programming (6), synthesizer (6)
- Pino Palladino – bass (3–4, 6, 9–10, 12, 14)
- Sam Cohen – drums (9)
- Sol Was – bass (7), programming (7)
- Tenroc – programming (11)
- Tommy King – bass (5, 12), keyboards (9), organ (1, 13–14), piano (3–5, 9, 12, 14), programming (1, 3, 5, 11, 13–14), synthesizer (3–5, 12, 14)
- Tori Kelly – background vocals (2, 4, 9, 13), lead vocals (1, 3, 5–8, 10–12, 14)
- Zayden Murillo – background vocals (1, 14)

=== Technical ===
- Chris Gehringer – masterer (all tracks)
- Dan Farber – engineer (2–4, 9–10, 13)
- Eli Heisler – assistant mixer (1, 6–14)
- Jason Gill – engineer (6)
- Jeff "Gitty" Gitelman – engineer (8)
- Jon Yeston – engineer (1, 3, 5, 10, 12–14)
- Neal Pogue – mixer (2–5)
- Oskar Widen – engineer (6)
- Rob Kinelski – mixer (1, 6–14)
- Sol Was – engineer (7)
- Tenroc – engineer (11)
- Tori Kelly – engineer (1, 4, 7–8, 10, 14)
- Zachary Acosta – assistant mixer (2–5)

== Charts ==
Chart performance for God Must Really Love Me
Chart (2026)	Peak position
UK Christian & Gospel Albums (Official Charts)	10

== Release history ==
Release history and formats for God Must Really Love Me
Region	Date	Format(s)	Label(s)
Various	June 12, 2026	CD; LP; digital download; streaming	Epic Records
