= Missin U (Tori Kelly song) =

2023 song by Tori Kelly

Single by Tori Kelly

from the EP Tori and the album Tori
- Released: March 17, 2023
- Recorded: 2022–2023
- Length: 2:57
- Label: Epic
- Songwriters: Tori Kelly; Clyde Lawrence; Jordan Cohen; Jason Cornet; Jonathan Bellion
- Producers: Tori Kelly; Tenroc; Jon Bellion; The Diner

Tori Kelly singles chronology
| "Unbothered" (2020) | "Missin U" (2023) | "Cut" (2023) |

"Missin U" is a 2023 song by American singer Tori Kelly. It is the lead single of her extended play (EP), Tori, released on March 17, 2023; later, it was included on her fifth studio album Tori (2024). The song contains samples of "Fill Me In", written by Craig David and Mark Hill, performed by David.

== Background ==
In an interview with People, Kelly said "Missin U"

is about missing somebody, but it's also, just so inspired by the early 2000s, late '90s. We wanted to make sure that we got that nostalgic feeling both in the lyrics and in the music. I just knew, 'OK, when people listen to this, I want them to be transported. I want them to think about that era or just that nostalgic feeling,' whatever that is for them.

== Reception ==
Though "Missin U" includes Kelly's "signature vocal acrobatics and chill-inducing runs", People's Jack Irvin highlighted how "missin u" departs from Kelly's typical style of "sweet melodies and strumming the guitar".

== Music video ==
The official music video for "Missin U", directed by Marc Klasfeld, was also released the March 17, 2023. Billboard said the video "serves up Y2K Fantasia and "takes cues from Aaliyah, Missy Elliott, Destiny's Child and more." People's Jack Irvin highlighted how the "Y2K-themed retrospective video", which included "clips from throughout her decade-long career, giv[es] listeners the space to reminisce before following her into a bold new sound".

Kelly has also indicated the music video includes Easter eggs.

== Charts ==
Chart performance for "Missin U"
| Chart (2023) | Peak position |
|---|---|
| New Zealand Hot Singles (RMNZ) | 21 |
