= Faith (Stevie Wonder song) =

Single by Stevie Wonder featuring Ariana Grande

from the album Sing: Original Motion Picture Soundtrack
- Released: November 4, 2016
- Recorded: 2016
- Studio: Canopy (Reykjavik, Iceland); Wonderland Studios (Los Angeles, CA); Mason Sound Studios (North Hollywood, CA)
- Length: 2:40
- Label: Universal Studios; Republic
- Songwriters: Ryan Tedder; Benjamin Levin; Francis Farewell Starlite
- Producers: Ryan Tedder; Benny Blanco

Stevie Wonder singles chronology
"Where the Sun Goes" (2016)	"Faith" (2016)	"Real Love" (2020)

Ariana Grande singles chronology
"My Favorite Part" (2016)	"Faith" (2016)	"Everyday" (2017)

Music video
- "Faith" on YouTube

"Faith" is a song by American singer Stevie Wonder featuring fellow American singer-songwriter Ariana Grande. It serves as the lead single from the soundtrack of the 2016 musical-animated film Sing. The song was written by Francis Farewell Starlite and producers Ryan Tedder and Benny Blanco. The single was released on November 4, 2016.

== Background ==
The song was announced to be the first single from Sing: Original Motion Picture Soundtrack, with Wonder contributing lead vocals and featuring Ariana Grande. The song was nominated for Best Original Song at the 74th Golden Globe Awards. The music video was released in December 2016.

The video for the song, directed by Alan Bibby, features Wonder at the piano and Grande singing, while walking on a pavement and accompanied by characters from the Sing movie.

== Charts ==
Chart (2016–2017)	Peak position
Belgium (Ultratip Bubbling Under Flanders)	39
France (SNEP)	103
Israel (Media Forest)	1
Italy (FIMI)	51
Japan Hot 100 (Billboard)	48
Poland (Polish Airplay Top 100)	24
Scotland Singles (OCC)	64

== Certifications ==
Region	Certification	Certified units/sales
Italy (FIMI)	Gold	25,000^{‡}
United Kingdom (BPI)	Silver	200,000^{‡}
^{‡} Sales+streaming figures based on certification alone.

== Release history ==
Region	Date	Format	Label	Ref
United States	November 4, 2016	CD; digital download	Universal Studios; Republic	
Italy	November 4, 2016	Contemporary hit radio	Universal	
