= Tori (EP) =

2023 extended play by Tori Kelly

EP by Tori Kelly
- Released: July 28, 2023
- Length: 19:45
- Labels: Epic; Beautiful Mind
- Producers: Tori Kelly; TenRoc; Jon Bellion; The Diner; P2J; Johnny Simpson

Tori Kelly chronology
A Tori Kelly Christmas (2020)	Tori (2023)	Tori (2024)

Singles from Tori
- 1. "Missin U" Released: March 17, 2023; 2. "Cut" Released: July 28, 2023; 3. "Young Gun" Released: September 16, 2023

Tori is the fourth extended play by American musician Tori Kelly. It was released on July 28, 2023, through Epic Records and Beautiful Mind Records as her first release under the recording contract. The EP spawned three singles: "Missin U", "Cut", and "Young Gun." It marks her first release in three years, after her Christmas album A Tori Kelly Christmas (2020). All of the songs on the EP would appear on Kelly’s fifth studio album of the same name.

== Background and release ==
In 2020, Kelly released a Christmas album, A Tori Kelly Christmas. In March 2023, it was announced that Kelly signed a recording contract with Epic Records. Five days prior to the EP's release, Kelly was hospitalized at Cedars-Sinai Medical Center after collapsing at a restaurant in Los Angeles, due to blood clots that had been found around vital organs in her body. In a statement posted on her social media, Kelly mentioned that she had to prioritize her health but the release of her EP still went on as scheduled.

== Promotion ==
On August 15, 2023, Kelly announced that she would embark on a concert tour, The Take Control Tour, visiting nine cities in North America, set to start in September 2023.

== Critical reception ==
Tina Benitez-Eves of American Songwriter gave the EP a four out of five stars, further said that "Kelly has a knack for revealing songs torn straight from the heart".

== Track listing ==
All tracks are written by Tori Kelly, Jason Cornet, Jonathan Bellion, Clyde Lawrence and Jordan Cohen, and produced by Kelly, TenRoc, Bellion and The Diner, with additional contributors noted.

Tori track listing
No.	Title	Writer(s)	Producer(s)	Length
1.	"Cut"	Rodney Jerkins; Timothy Mosley		2:56
2.	"Missin U"	Craig David^{[a]}; Mark Hill^{[a]}		2:57
3.	"Shelter"	Chloe George		2:51
4.	"Unbelievable" (featuring Ayra Starr)	Oyinkansola Sarah Aderibigbe; Richard Isong	P2J	2:38
5.	"Alive If I Die"	Gaia Gozzi		2:34
6.	"Young Gun" (featuring Jon Bellion)	Jonathan Simpson	Johnny Simpson	2:53
7.	"Missin U" (R&B edit)	David^{[a]}; Hill^{[a]}		2:52

Notes

- All tracks are stylized in all lowercase letters.
- A deluxe version was released featuring the live versions of "Shelter", "Alive If I Die" and "Missin U" from her Vevo performances.

Sample credits

- ^{^[a]}"Missin U" contains samples of "Fill Me In", written by Craig David and Mark Hill, performed by David.

== Charts ==
Chart performance for Tori
Chart (2023)	Peak position
UK Album Downloads (Official Charts)	90
US Top Current Album Sales (Billboard)	71
