= Solitude (EP) =

EP by Tori Kelly
- Released: August 14, 2020
- Recorded: 2020
- Length: 16:23
- Label: Capitol
- Producer: Tori Kelly; Monro; Stint; Spencer Stewart; Jorgen Odegard

Tori Kelly chronology
Inspired by True Events (2019)	Solitude (2020)	A Tori Kelly Christmas (2020)

Singles from Solitude
- 1. "Time Flies" Released: July 22, 2020; 2. "Unbothered" Released: August 11, 2020

Solitude is the third extended play (EP) by American singer Tori Kelly. It serves as her first release after three full-length studio albums. Kelly released "Time Flies" as the lead single on July 22, 2020. The EP was released on August 14, 2020.

== Background ==
Kelly wrote and recorded most of the songs in isolation during the COVID-19 quarantine, in her home studio in California. Kelly stated that the process felt like going back to her roots when she created music from her bedroom as an unsigned artist.

== Track listing ==
Solitude track listing
No.	Title	Writer(s)	Producer(s)	Length
1.	"Value"	Tori Kelly; Etham Basden; Ross James	Kelly; Monro	3:17
2.	"Don’t Take Me Home"	Kelly; Ajay Bhattacharyya; Spencer Stewart	Kelly; Stint; Stewart	3:55
3.	"Time Flies"	Aubrey Graham; Ozan Yıldırım	Kelly	3:19
4.	"Unbothered"	Kelly; Jorgen Odegard; Micah Premnath; Chloe George	Odegard	3:23
5.	"Glad"	Kelly	Kelly	2:31
Total length:				16:23

== Charts ==
Chart performance for Solitude
Chart (2020)	Peak position
US Top Current Albums (Billboard)	60
