= Tori (album) =

Studio album by Tori Kelly
- Released: April 5, 2024
- Genre: R&B; pop
- Length: 40:37
- Label: Epic; Beautiful Mind
- Producer: Tori Kelly; TenRoc; Jon Bellion; The Diner; Jason Cornet; Jonny Koh; The Monsters & Strangerz; P2J; Johnny Simpson

Tori Kelly chronology
Tori (2023)	Tori (2024)	God Must Really Love Me (2026)

Singles from Tori
- 1. "High Water" Released: February 9, 2024; 2. "Thing U Do" Released: April 5, 2024

Tori (stylized as TORI.) is the fifth studio album by American singer and songwriter Tori Kelly. It was released on April 5, 2024, through Epic Records and Beautiful Mind Records. Tori follows A Tori Kelly Christmas (2020).

The album features guest vocal performances from Ayra Starr, Kim Chae-won, and Jon Bellion.

== Background ==
In March 2023, it was announced that Kelly had signed a recording contract with Epic Records. She began releasing tracks from her upcoming fifth album (including the singles "Missin U", "Cut", and "Young Gun") before compiling them on an extended play of the same title, Tori (2023). In the fall of 2023, she embarked on the Take Control Tour in support of the EP.

Kelly felt she had finished work on the album in early 2023 after several sessions with singer-songwriter Jon Bellion. However, she was inspired to write the lead single "High Water", after suffering a health emergency due to blood clots in her legs and lungs that July. The track was released on February 9, 2024.

She embarked on the Purple Skies Tour in support of the album, with the first leg starting on April 12, 2024, in Ventura and concluding on May 3, 2024, in Kansas City. She started the second part of the tour on August 17, 2024, in Taipei, Taiwan and concluded on December 9, 2024, in London, England.

== Composition ==
Tori. is an R&B and pop album which heavily borrows from Y2K-inspired sounds. It features powerful vocals and upbeat production as a result of Kelly being in a "happy place" during the record's conception. The album shows the influence of producers Timbaland and Darkchild who established the production style of Destiny's Child. Kelly said another influence include Aaliyah.

== Track listing ==
All tracks are written by Tori Kelly, Jason Cornet and Jonathan Bellion, and produced by TenRoc and Bellion, with additional contributors noted.

Tori track listing
No.	Title	Writer(s)	Producer(s)	Length
1.	"Thing U Do"	Clyde Lawrence; Jordan Cohen; Suzanne Vega	Tori Kelly; The Diner	4:05
2.	"Missin U"	Lawrence; Cohen; Craig David^{[a]}; Mark Hill^{[a]}	Kelly; The Diner	2:57
3.	"Diamonds"		Kelly; Elkan^{[c]}	3:00
4.	"Cut"	Lawrence; Cohen; Rodney Jerkins; Timothy Mosley	Kelly; The Diner	2:56
5.	"Spruce" (featuring Kim Chaewon of Le Sserafim)	Lawrence; Cohen; Casey Smith	Cohen; Jonny Koh	2:43
6.	"Shelter"	Lawrence; Cohen; Chloe George	Kelly; The Diner	2:51
7.	"Oceans"	Lawrence; Cohen; Richard Isong	Kelly; The Diner	2:38
8.	"Purple Skies (Interlude)"	Lawrence; Cohen; Isong	The Diner	0:26
9.	"Unbelievable" (featuring Ayra Starr)	Lawrence; Cohen; Oyinkansola Sarah Aderibigbe; Isong	Kelly; P2J; The Diner	2:38
10.	"Shine On"	Lawrence; Cohen; Michael Pollack; Stefan Johnson; Jordan Johnson	Kelly; The Diner; The Monsters & Strangerz	2:57
11.	"High Water"			2:48
12.	"Young Gun" (featuring Jon Bellion)	Lawrence; Cohen; Jonathan Simpson	Kelly; The Diner; Johnny Simpson	2:53
13.	"Alive If I Die"	Lawrence; Cohen; Gaia Gozzi	Kelly; The Diner	2:34
14.	"Missin U" (R&B edit)	Lawrence; Cohen; David^{[a]}; Hill^{[a]}	Kelly; The Diner	2:52
15.	"Same Girl"		Kelly	2:28
Total length:				40:37

Tori (+ a lil more) track listing
No.	Title	Writer(s)	Producer(s)	Length
1.	"Distance"	Kelly; Bellion; Cornet; Elijah Noll; Grace Youn	Kelly; TenRoc	3:11
2.	"Bottomline" (featuring JoJo)	Kelly; Joanna Levesque; Bellion; J. Johnson; S. Johnson	Kelly; Bellion; The Monsters & Strangerz	3:22
3.	"U"	Kelly; Andrew Neely; Peder Losnegård	Kelly; Lido	2:50
4.	"Beautiful War" (featuring Pink Sweats)	Kelly; David Bowden; Dante Bowden; Joseph Ruffin	Dante Bowden; Ruffin	2:02
Total length:				51:32

Notes

- ^{^[c]} signifies a co-producer
- All tracks are stylized in all lowercase letters.

Sample credits

- ^{^[a]} "Missin U" contains samples of "Fill Me In", written by Craig David and Mark Hill, performed by David.

== Personnel ==
Musicians

- Tori Kelly – lead vocals, background vocals
- Jason Cornet – programming, synthesizer (tracks 1–6, 9, 11–15); guitar (1–5, 7, 11–13, 15), bass (1, 5, 11, 15), background vocals (1, 2, 13, 14), drums (3, 11, 15)
- Jon Bellion – background vocals (tracks 1, 2, 4–7, 9, 13), programming (1, 2, 4–6, 9, 12–14)
- Clyde Lawrence – background vocals (tracks 1, 2, 4–6, 12, 14), synthesizer (1, 2, 4, 5, 8, 9, 12–14), guitar (13), bass (1)
- Jordan Cohen – programming, synthesizer (tracks 1, 2, 4–6, 9, 12–14); background vocals (1, 2), horns (1), saxophone (5)
- Jonny Koh – programming (track 1), guitar (5, 12, 13), synthesizer (5, 12)
- Jon Batiste – background vocals (track 1)
- Jon Lampley – horns (track 1)
- Johnny Simpson – background vocals (track 2)
- Timbaland – background vocals (track 4)
- Mateus Asato – guitar (tracks 6, 7)
- Laura Metcalf – cello (track 8)
- The Resonance Collective – strings (track 8)
- Tomoko Akaboshi – violin (track 8)
- Grace Youn – violin (track 1)
- Jeanine Cornet – trumpet (track 9)

Technical

- Chris Gehringer – mastering
- Serban Ghenea – mixing
- TenRoc – engineering (tracks 1–9, 11–15)
- Jordan Cohen – engineering (tracks 1, 2, 4, 5, 7, 8, 12–14)
- Jonny Koh – engineering (tracks 1, 5, 7, 8, 12), engineering assistance (2, 4, 6, 9, 13, 14)
- John Arbuckle – engineering (tracks 1, 7, 10, 13)
- Peter Enriquez – engineering (track 8)
- Bryce Bordone – engineering (tracks 10, 11, 15), engineering assistance (2, 4, 6, 9, 12–14)
