= Never Alone (Tori Kelly song) =

2018 single by Tori Kelly

Single by Tori Kelly

from the album Hiding Place
- Released: August 24, 2018
- Recorded: 2018
- Genre: Gospel
- Length: 3:34
- Label: Capitol; Schoolboy
- Songwriter(s): Tori Kelly; Kirk Franklin
- Producer(s): Kirk Franklin; Max Stark; Rondald Hill

Tori Kelly singles chronology
"Help Us To Love" (2018)	"Never Alone" (2018)	"Change Your Mind" (2019)

Music video
- "Never Alone" on YouTube

"Never Alone" is a song by American singer Tori Kelly. The track was released as the lead single from her second studio album, Hiding Place, on August 24, 2018. The song was written by Kelly and Kirk Franklin. It was Kelly's first number one song on the US Billboard Hot Gospel Songs chart.

== Accolades ==
The single won a Grammy Award for Best Gospel Performance/Song at the 2019 Grammy Awards.

== Charts ==
=== Weekly charts ===
Weekly chart performance for "Never Alone"
Chart (2019)	Peak position
New Zealand Hot Singles (RMNZ)	34
US Adult R&B Songs (Billboard)	25
US Christian Songs (Billboard)	14
US Hot Gospel Songs (Billboard)	1

=== Year-end charts ===
2019 year-end chart performance for "Never Alone"
Chart (2019)	Position
US Christian Songs (Billboard)	66
US Christian CHR Songs (Billboard)	49
US Gospel Songs (Billboard)	14
