= Tori Kelly =

American singer-songwriter (born 1992)

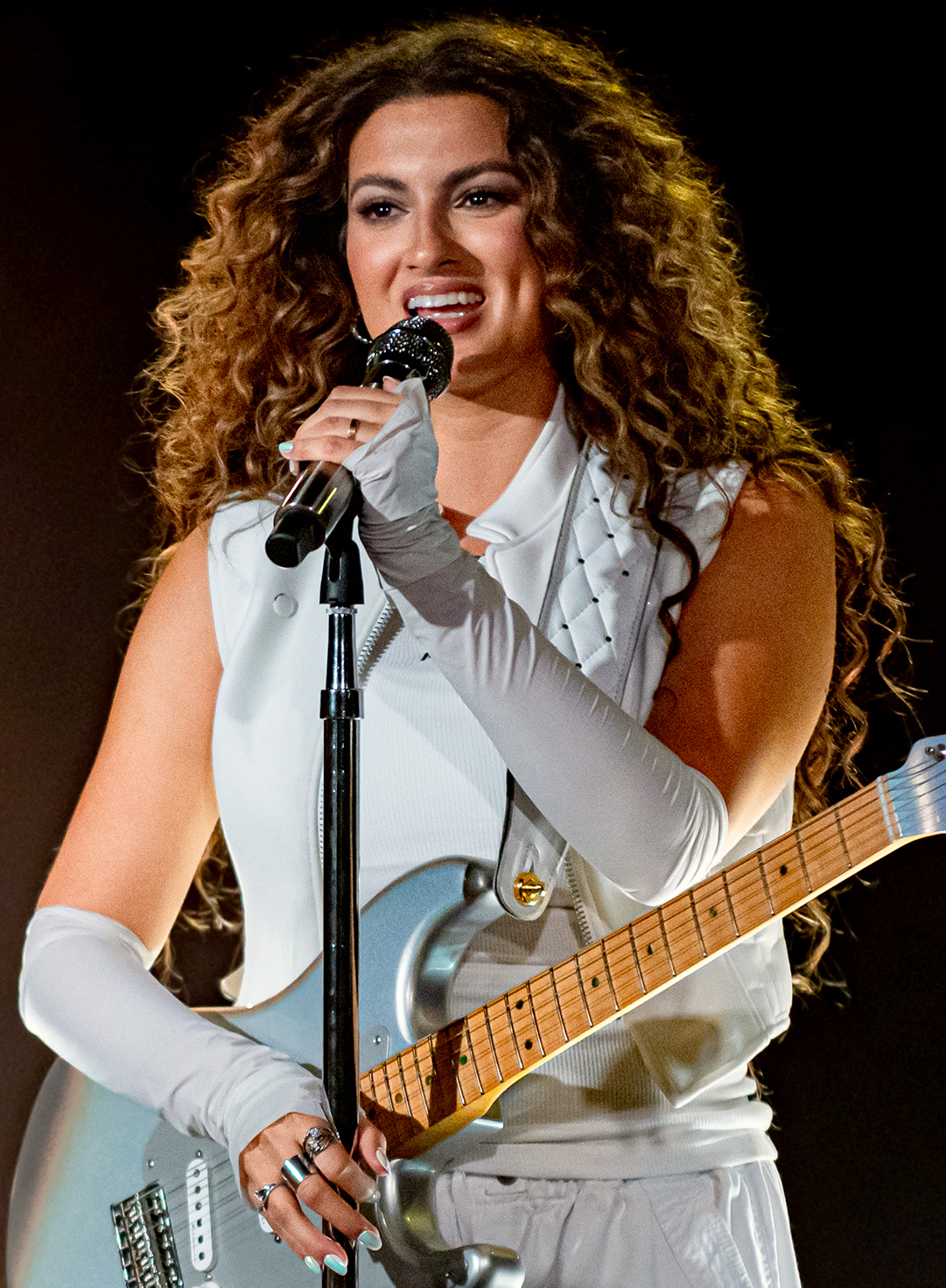
- Kelly in 2023
- Born: Victoria Loren Kelly; December 14, 1992 (age 33); Wildomar, California, U.S.
- Occupation: Singer-songwriter
- Years active: 2003–present
- Works: Discography; songs recorded
- Spouse: André Murillo (m. 2018)
- Children: 1
- Musical career
- Origin: Canyon Lake, California, U.S.
- Genres: R&B; pop; hip-hop; soul; gospel
- Instruments: Vocals; guitar
- Labels: Epic; Beautiful Mind; Capitol; Schoolboy; Geffen
- Website: torikellymusic.com

Victoria Loren "Tori" Kelly (born December 14, 1992) is an American singer-songwriter. She first gained recognition on YouTube before making it through to Hollywood week on the ninth season of American Idol in 2010 and eventually releasing her debut EP, Handmade Songs (2012).

In 2013, Kelly signed with Capitol Records and released her first major-label EP Foreword (2013) which reached top 20 on the US Billboard 200. She followed with her debut studio album Unbreakable Smile (2015), which peaked at number two and garnered the singles "Nobody Love", "Should've Been Us" and "Hollow" which marked her first three appearances on the Billboard Hot 100.

Kelly released her second studio album, Hiding Place (2018), to critical acclaim and won two Grammy Awards for Best Gospel Album and Best Gospel Performance/Song. She followed with Inspired by True Events (2019), A Tori Kelly Christmas (2020), and later signed to Epic Records and released Tori (2024) and God Must Really Love Me (2026). Outside of music, Kelly has voiced Meena in the Sing franchise and competed on The Masked Singer. She has received numerous accolades including a BET Award, two Billboard Music Awards, three Grammy Awards overall, and a GMA Dove Award.

== Early life ==
Victoria Loren Kelly was born in Wildomar, California, to Laura, who is of Irish and German descent, and Allwyn, who is of Jamaican and Puerto Rican ancestry. She has a younger brother named Noah. Growing up, she was exposed to a variety of music by her parents. "I give them a lot of credit for just playing all different genres, and no genre was off limits," she said when asked about her upbringing. Kelly is a Christian. Faith plays a part in her songwriting, though she does not consider herself a part of the Christian music genre. Kelly appeared on the show Star Search, but lost to vocalist Tiffany Evans, who won the title of Junior Champion in the junior singer division.

In 2004, she participated on America's Most Talented Kid, singing Christina Aguilera's "Keep on Singin' My Song" and won, beating out musician Hunter Hayes. She made a second appearance on the show in the Tournament of Champions, but lost to Antonio Pontarelli, a rock musician. At age twelve, Kelly accepted a record deal with Geffen Records, but both sides agreed to end the contract due to creative differences. In 2007, Kelly began posting videos to YouTube, at the age of 14. The first video she uploaded was a cover of John Wesley Work Jr.'s "Go Tell It on the Mountain", which she originally performed back in December 2004. Kelly gained recognition for her acoustic cover, with a fellow YouTuber named Angie Girl, of Frank Ocean's "Thinkin Bout You".

Despite failing to reach the top 24 on American Idol, she took a new tack in her music, learning how to play the guitar, composing original song pieces, and recording them herself on her computer. Tori began posting her performances on YouTube, and quickly reached over 1,000,000 subscribers.

== Career ==
=== 2010–2014: American Idol and breakthrough ===
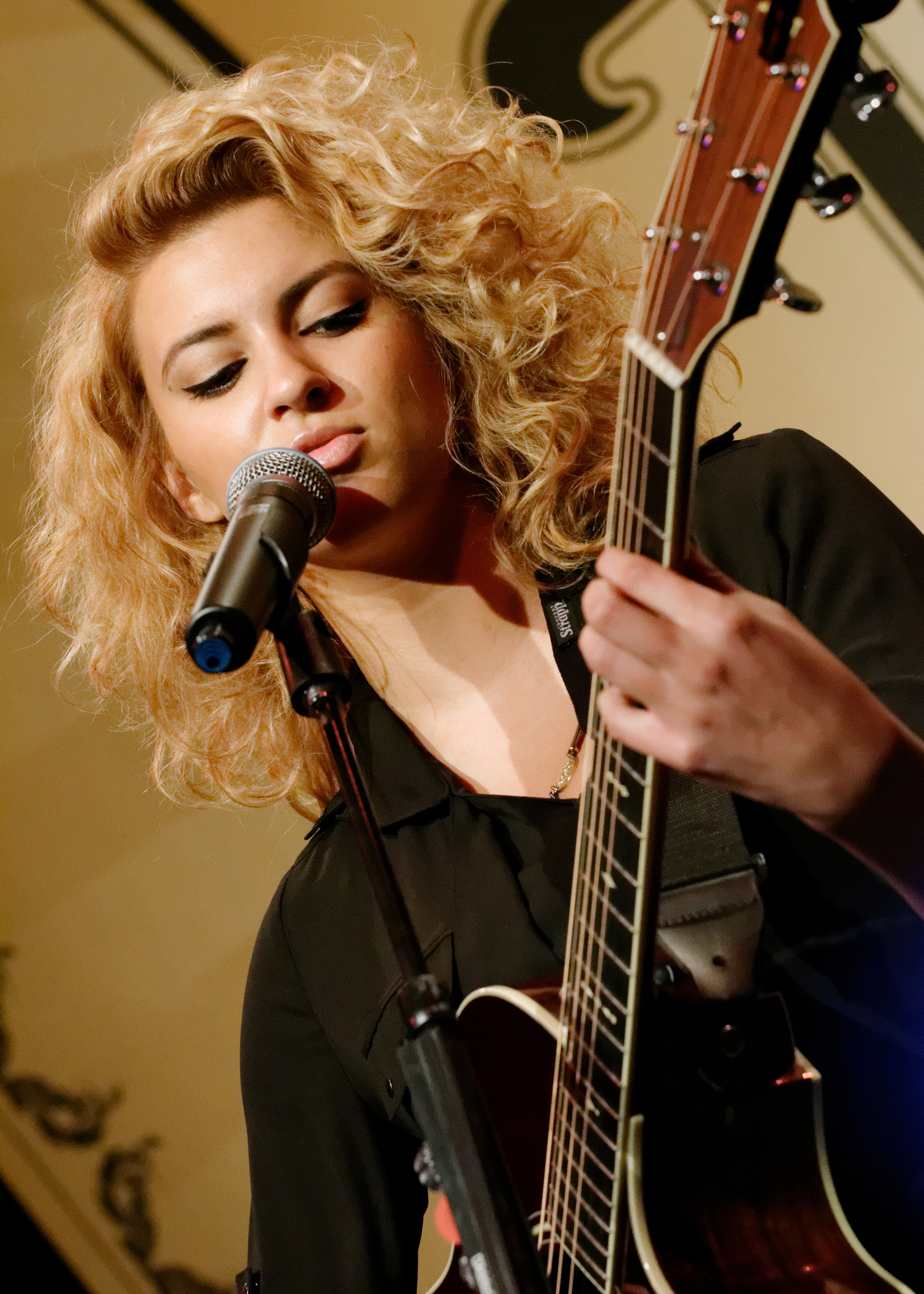
Kelly performing in 2014

In 2010, Tori auditioned for Season 9 of American Idol in Denver, Colorado and made it through to Hollywood Week but did not reach the "Top 24" of the artists. She had claimed that she was 'devastated' but she had given it her all. Afterwards, she was asked to take part in a youth version of the 1985 charity song "We Are the World" titled "We Are the World: The Next Generation". On May 1, 2012, she released her first EP, titled Handmade Songs by Tori Kelly, which was released on her own label, Toraay Records. Kelly wrote, produced, engineered, and recorded the EP by herself in her bedroom. Shortly after its release, the EP made it to the Top 10 Pop Albums list on iTunes. She called the EP a "warm up" to a full-length album that was to come in the future. As of 2013, it had sold more than 14,000 copies and reached number nine on the US Heatseekers Albums chart.

In February 2013, Kelly released a single called "Fill a Heart", which she wrote for the "Child Hunger Ends Here" campaign by ConAgra Foods and Feeding America. The song was later performed by British boy band the Wanted on Dancing with the Stars. Starting in April 2013, Kelly performed at eight venues across continental U.S. for her "Fill a Heart" tour, helping out at the cities' food banks during the day. She has performed in venues such as the Troubador and the Roxy in Los Angeles, the Gramercy Theater in New York and Bush Hall in London. She has also been featured in magazines such as Teen Vogue, Elle and Glamour.

During mid-2013, Kelly's newly assigned manager Scooter Braun introduced her to the heads of Capitol Records. She had been "very skeptical" about signing with a major record label in fear that things would not work out in her favor. "I'd been burned before. But when I met those guys, I had never felt that way: They were fans and really got me." On September 6, 2013, she was signed to Capitol Records.

In September 2013, she was picked as Elvis Duran's Artist of the Month and was featured on NBC's Today show hosted by Kathie Lee Gifford and Hoda Kotb, where she performed her single "Dear No One". Kelly announced on The Today Show that her major label debut, a second EP, titled Foreword, would be released on October 22, 2013, on Capitol Records. By the end of November the EP had sold more than 16,000 copies, debuting at number 16 on the US Billboard 200. Kelly was the sole supporting act to Ed Sheeran at Madison Square Garden on November 1, 2013, and supported Sam Smith on their In the Lonely Hour UK tour in October 2014. Kelly wrote and recorded a song called "Silent" for The Giver: Music Collection, supporting the film adaptation (The Giver) of the novel The Giver, which was released on iTunes on August 5, 2014. On August 7, 2014, Kelly posted a live acoustic version of the song on her YouTube channel; which has over 2.6 million views as of October 2015. Kelly was featured on "Lullaby" by British rapper Professor Green, which was released in the United Kingdom on September 14, 2014. The song peaked at number four on the UK Singles Chart, thus providing Kelly with her first top ten song in the United Kingdom.

Kelly was featured on the medley "Winter Wonderland"/"Don't Worry Be Happy" on Pentatonix's album That's Christmas to Me that was released in October 2014. On December 1, 2014, it was announced that Tori Kelly was one of MTV's Artist's To Watch. She privately performed two songs for MTV: "Funny" and "Dear No One"; both can be found on her Artist To Watch page. Her "Funny" performance was aired on MTV for several weeks.

=== 2015–2018: Unbreakable Smile and Hiding Place ===
Throughout 2014, Kelly worked with Braun on her debut album in which she had contributions from Toby Gad, Max Martin, and Ed Sheeran. The lead single from the album, "Nobody Love", was released on February 8, 2015. It was written by Rickard Goransson, Max Martin, and Tori Kelly herself. Kelly performed "Nobody Love" at the 2015 Billboard Music Awards. The album, entitled Unbreakable Smile, was released on June 23, 2015, and debuted at number two on the Billboard 200. Kelly performed "Should've Been Us" at the 2015 MTV Video Music Awards. In October 2015, Kelly covered the song "Colors of the Wind" from Pocahontas on the We Love Disney album. "Hollow" was released on October 22, 2015 as the first single from the new edition of Unbreakable Smile. In the same month, Kelly became the brand-ambassador of William Rast, the clothing line co-founded by Justin Timberlake. In late 2015, Kelly received a nomination for Best New Artist at the 58th Grammy Awards. She performed at the ceremony with English singer James Bay. She became the first artist in history to perform a Christian pop song at the Grammy Awards.

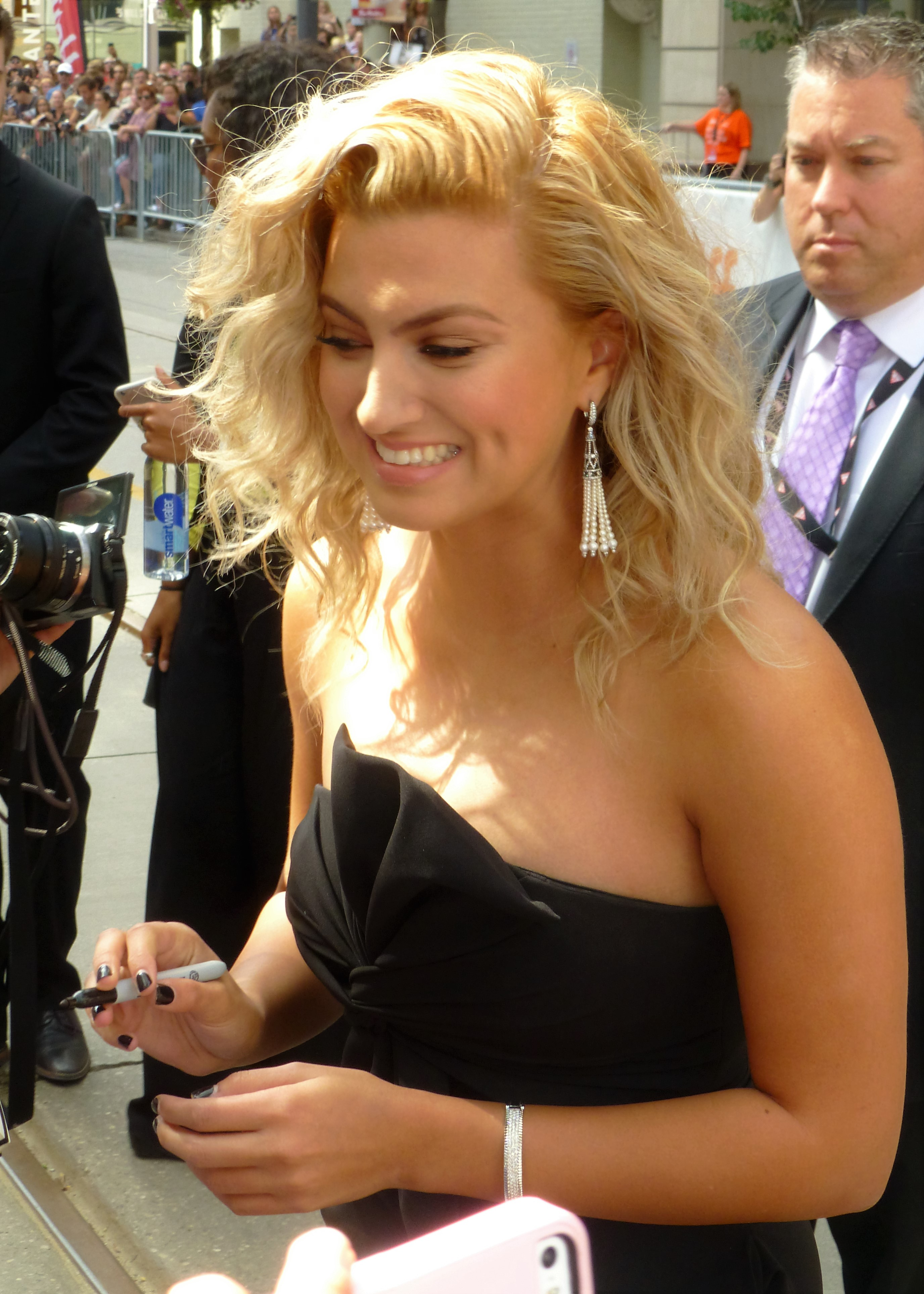
Kelly at the Toronto Film Festival in 2016

Kelly recorded an updated version of Amy Grant's 1991 single "Baby Baby", with Grant herself. Commemorating its 25th anniversary, when Kelly was still 23, the song was released on April 29, 2016. Kelly made her cinematic debut in the animated film Sing (2016), voicing Meena the elephant. On July 10, 2016, Kelly released an original song "Blink of an Eye" to honor her friend Christina Grimmie, on the one-month anniversary of her murder.

On May 7, 2017, Kelly played the Beale Street Music Festival in Memphis, Tennessee, opening for Soundgarden at what would be one of their final performances before frontman Chris Cornell died by suicide on May 17. On June 9, Kelly and rapper Lecrae, released the single "I'll Find You", with Kelly as the featured artist. The accompanying music video was released on July 28, 2017. It features various St. Jude Hospital patients, and Kelly and Lecrae singing over a black backdrop. It peaked at No. 11 on the Billboard R&B/Hip-Hop chart, No. 1 on the Hot Christian Songs and No. 17 on the Billboard Bubbling Under Hot 100 chart. She also collaborated with country singer Chris Lane on his single "Take Back Home Girl" which has since charted at No. 57 on the Billboard Hot 100. In September 2017, Kelly announced her engagement to basketball player André Murillo. In December 2017, she performed a version of "Have Yourself a Merry Little Christmas" with Jacob Collier, posted to YouTube.

On March 30, 2018, Kelly released the single "Help Us to Love" featuring the HamilTones, which served as the lead single to her second studio album. On May 20, 2018, she announced her and Murillo's marriage in an Instagram post. On August 23, Kelly revealed on her personal Instagram that her album, Hiding Place, would be released on September 14. The second single of the album, "Never Alone", was released on August 24. On September 7, Kelly announced a tour in support of the album. Kelly later earned her first Grammy Awards with Hiding Place which won Best Gospel Album and Best Gospel Performance/Song with "Never Alone" from the 61st Annual Grammy Awards.

=== 2019–2022: Inspired by True Events and other projects ===
On January 18, 2019, Kelly announced that she would be going on The Acoustic Sessions tour starting in February. Tickets went on sale on January 25 along with the release of her new lead single "Change Your Mind" for her upcoming third studio album. On June 26, 2019, Kelly announced her third studio album Inspired by True Events which was released on August 9, 2019.

Kelly announced the "Inspired by True Events Tour", which was to visit American and European cities, in October 2019. However, on December 18, 2019, Kelly announced that the tour would now only involve Europe, Australia, and Asia, with new dates added, and a quiet cancelation of the American leg of the tour. On March 18, 2020, Kelly canceled her remaining tour stops in Europe, Australia, and Asia due to the COVID-19 pandemic.

On March 21, 2020, Kelly began broadcasting a daily live stream on Instagram which she named "QuaranTEA with Tori." The show was hosted from her home where she sang fan-requested songs, answered fans' questions, and featured several celebrity guests to interview and duet with (remotely). The guests included AJ Rafael, Alessia Cara, David Archuleta, Demi Lovato, H.E.R., Jessie J, JoJo, Jordin Sparks, Kirk Franklin, Natasha Bedingfield, and many more. After 7 weeks, Kelly ended the show to work on new music.

On July 22, 2020, Kelly released a cover of Drake's "Time Flies" as the first single of her EP Solitude. On August 11, three days before the EP's release, Kelly released "Unbothered" as the second single. Kelly released Solitude on August 14 which includes four original songs which she wrote while in quarantine during the coronavirus pandemic. On July 30, 2020, Kelly was featured on Jacob Collier's "Running Outta Love" from his album Djesse Vol. 3. A version for The Late Show with Stephen Colbert was released on August 3.

On October 7, Kelly announced a Christmas album, A Tori Kelly Christmas, which was released on October 30. The album was produced by Babyface. Two extra songs, including an original and a cover of "All I Want for Christmas Is You", were released as bonus tracks exclusively at Target. In late 2020, Kelly also competed on season 4 of The Masked Singer as "Seahorse". Kelly made it to the semi-finals of the competition, before being unmasked in a triple elimination alongside Chloe Kim as "Jellyfish" and Taylor Dayne as "Popcorn".

In 2021, Kelly recorded a cover of "Waving Through a Window" for the soundtrack album of the 2021 film adaptation of Dear Evan Hansen, produced by Justin Goldner. On November 2, 2021, she published her first book, The Curly Girl Blues. That same year, she reprised her role as Meena in Sing 2.

=== 2023–present: Tori and God Must Really Love Me ===
In February 2023, Kelly performed a rendition of "Hallelujah" alongside Andrea Bocelli for Bocelli's music special The Journey: A Music Special from Andrea Bocelli. In March, it was announced that Kelly had signed with Epic Records, and released her first release under the label, "Missin U", which sampled the 2000s single "Fill Me In" by Craig David. On her new sound, Kelly noted that she "wanted to go back in time" and revisit R&B and hip-hop sounds popularized by 90s and mid-2000s artists like Destiny's Child, Aaliyah, Missy Elliott, and TLC. On July 28, 2023, Kelly released her fourth EP, Tori under Epic and singer-songwriter Jon Bellion's record label Beautiful Mind. A deluxe reissue of the EP was also released with three live recordings.

In February 2024, Kelly released the single "High Water" and announced her fifth studio album, Tori. The album was released on April 5, 2024. A deluxe edition was released on October 11, 2024.

In May 2026, Kelly announced the release of her sixth studio album God Must Really Love Me, which was released on June 12, 2026.

== Personal life ==
Kelly married André Murillo, a professional basketball player in Germany, in 2018. In July 2025, she announced that they were expecting their first child. She gave birth to a baby boy named Zayden Michael Murillo on November 11, 2025.

On July 23, 2023, Kelly was hospitalized at Cedars-Sinai Medical Center after collapsing at a restaurant in Los Angeles. Blood clots had been found in her legs and around her lungs. On July 27, Kelly released a message stating that she felt better but was undergoing treatment. On July 31, she was discharged from the hospital.

== Artistry ==
=== Influences ===
Kelly cited gospel music as childhood music influence, praising artists such as, Kirk Franklin and J Moss. and contemporary Christian music singers such as Crystal Lewis, Stacie Orrico and Rachael Lampa. Kelly has frequently cited R&B, pop, and soul artists for her music influences, including Lauryn Hill, Aaliyah, Mary Mary, Mariah Carey, Destiny's Child, Beyoncé, Brandy Norwood, Jill Scott, Jazmine Sullivan, Kelly Clarkson, Christina Aguilera, India Arie, and TLC. She also cited music productions by Timbaland and Darkchild as inspiration. Her other influences or inspirations Stevie Wonder, Maxwell, Michael Jackson, Justin Timberlake, John Mayer, and Alexis Ffrench.

== Discography ==
- Unbreakable Smile (2015)
- Hiding Place (2018)
- Inspired by True Events (2019)
- A Tori Kelly Christmas (2020)
- Tori (2024)
- God Must Really Love Me (2026)

== Tours ==
Headlining

- Where I Belong Tour (2015)
- Unbreakable Tour (2016)
- Hiding Place Tour (2018)
- The Acoustic Sessions Tour (2019)
- Take Control Tour (2023)
- Purple Skies Tour (2024)

Supporting

- Sam Smith - In the Lonely Hour Tour (2015)
- Ed Sheeran – +–=÷× Tour (all European dates) (2025)
- Forrest Frank - Jesus Generation Tour (with Cory Asbury and The Figs, 2026)

== Filmography ==
=== Film ===
Year	Title	Role	Notes
2016	Sing	Meena	Voice
2021	Sing 2	Meena	Voice
2022	Jerry & Marge Go Large	Herself	
2024	Sing: Thriller	Meena	Voice, short film

=== Television ===
Year	Title	Role	Notes
2003	Star Search	Herself	Contestant
2004	America's Most Talented Kid	Herself	Contestant
2010	American Idol	Herself	Season 9
2016	The Voice	Herself	Season 10 Battle Advisor for Team Adam Levine
2016	The Wonderful World of Disney: Disneyland 60	Herself	Sang "The Rainbow Connection" with Kermit the Frog
2016	Beat Bugs	Millie Pede	Episode: 24b
2016	Sesame Street	Herself	Sang "Try a Little Kindness"
2017–present	Nationwide commercials	Herself	
2020	The Disney Family Singalong	Herself	Television special
2020	The Masked Singer	Herself (Seahorse)	Season 4
2021	American Idol	Herself/Mentor	Season 19
2021	The Not-Too-Late Show with Elmo	Herself	Season 2, Episode 12
2022	Rugrats	Cynthia	Voice, episode: "Rescuing Cynthia"
2023	THE JOURNEY: A Music Special from Andrea Bocelli	Herself	Sings various songs plus "Hallelujah" with Bocelli, on this four-part series also re-edited into a full-length theatrical version
2024	American Idol	Herself/Mentor	Season 22
2024	Celebrity Family Feud	Herself/Team Captain	Season 11, Episode 2 Played against Meghan Trainor's Family
2025	Celebrity Wheel of Fortune	Herself	Season 6, Episode 6 Played with Big Sean and 2 Chainz

=== Video games ===
Year	Title	Role	Notes
2027	Stranger Than Heaven	Suzy Day	Voice

== Awards and nominations ==
Tori Kelly awards and nominations
Awards and nominations
Award	Wins	Nominations
BET	1	2
Billboard	1	4
Grammy	3	6
MTV Europe	0	3
People's Choice	0	1
Soul Train	0	2
Teen Choice	0	2
Billboard Women in Music	1	1
Glamour Awards	0	1
GMA Dove Awards	1	2
Radio Disney Music Awards	1	2
Streamy Awards	0	1
YouTube Music Awards	1	1

Totals (Note: Certain award groups do not simply award one winner. They acknowledge several different recipients, have runners-up, and have third place. Since this is a specific recognition and is different from losing an award, runner-up mentions are considered wins in this award tally. For simplification and to avoid errors, each award in this list has been presumed to have had a prior nomination.)
- Wins: 9
- Nominations: 28

The following is a list of awards and nominations received by Tori Kelly.

=== Awards ===
Award	Year (Note: Indicates the year of ceremony. Each year is linked to the article about the awards held that year, wherever possible.)	Category	Recipient(s) and nominee(s)	Result	Ref.
BET Awards	2018	Dr. Bobby Jones Best Gospel/Inspirational	I'll Find You (with Lecrae)	Won	
BET Awards	2019	Dr. Bobby Jones Best Gospel/Inspirational	"Never Alone" (with Kirk Franklin)	Nominated	
Billboard Music Awards	2018	Top Christian Song	"I'll Find You"	Nominated	
Billboard Music Awards	2019	Top Gospel Artist	Herself	Nominated	
Billboard Music Awards	2019	Top Gospel Album	Hiding Place	Won	
Billboard Music Awards	2019	Top Gospel Song	"Never Alone" (with Kirk Franklin)	Nominated	
Billboard Music Awards	2021	Top Christian Song	"Together"	Nominated	
Billboard Women in Music	2015	Breakthrough Artist	Herself	Won	
Glamour Awards	2016	International Musician/ Solo Artist	Herself	Nominated	
GMA Dove Awards	2018	Song of the Year	"I'll Find You" (with Lecrae)	Nominated	
GMA Dove Awards	2018	Short Form Video Of the Year	"I'll Find You" (with Lecrae)	Won	
GMA Dove Awards	2021	Christmas / Special Event Album of the Year	A Tori Kelly Christmas	Nominated	
GMA Dove Awards	2021	Pop/Contemporary Recorded Song of the Year	"Together"	Nominated	
Grammy Awards	2016	Best New Artist	Herself	Nominated	
Grammy Awards	2019	Best Gospel Album	Hiding Place	Won	
Grammy Awards	2019	Best Gospel Performance/Song	"Never Alone" (with Kirk Franklin)	Won	
Grammy Awards	2022	Album of the Year	Justice (as Featured Artist)	Nominated	
Grammy Awards	2022	Best Traditional Pop Vocal Album	A Tori Kelly Christmas	Nominated	
Grammy Awards	2025	Best Arrangement, Instrumental or A Cappella	"Bridge Over Troubled Water" (with Jacob Collier and John Legend)	Won	
MTV Europe Music Awards	2015	Best New Act	Herself	Nominated	
MTV Europe Music Awards	2015	Best Push Act	Herself	Nominated	
MTV Europe Music Awards	2015	Artist on the Rise	Herself	Nominated	
NAACP Image Awards	2019	Outstanding Gospel/Christian Album (Traditional or Contemporary)	Hiding Place	Nominated	
NAACP Image Awards	2019	Outstanding Song – Traditional	"Never Alone"	Nominated	
People's Choice Awards	2016	Favorite Breakout Artist	Herself	Nominated	
Radio Disney Music Awards	2016	Breakout Artist of the Year	Herself	Won	
Radio Disney Music Awards	2016	Best Crush Song	"Should've Been Us"	Nominated	
Radio Disney Music Awards	2018	Country Favorite Song	"Take Back Home Girl" (with Chris Lane)	Nominated	
Soul Train Music Awards	2018	Best Gospel/Inspirational Award	Herself	Nominated	
Soul Train Music Awards	2019	Best Gospel/Inspirational Award	Herself	Nominated	
Stellar Awards	2019	Female Vocalist of the Year	Herself	Nominated	
Stellar Awards	2019	Contemporary Female Vocalist of the Year	Herself	Nominated	
Stellar Awards	2019	Urban/Inspirational Single or Performance of the Year	"Never Alone" (featuring Kirk Franklin)	Nominated	
Streamy Awards	2015	Breakthrough Artist 1875	Herself	Nominated	
Teen Choice Awards	2015	Choice Web Star: Music	Herself	Nominated	
Teen Choice Awards	2017	Choice Movie Actress: Comedy	Herself	Nominated	
VH1's Big Music in 2015: You Oughta Know	2015	Artist of the Year	Herself	Nominated	
YouTube Music Awards	2015	50 Artists to Watch	Herself	Won	
