= A Tori Kelly Christmas =

Studio album by Tori Kelly
- Released: October 30, 2020
- Genres: Christmas; pop; R&B
- Length: 41:36
- Labels: Capitol; Schoolboy
- Producers: Tori Kelly; Babyface; Spencer Stewart; Demonte Posey; Wendy Wang

Tori Kelly chronology
Solitude (2020)	A Tori Kelly Christmas (2020)	Tori (2023)

Singles from A Tori Kelly Christmas
- 1. "Let It Snow" Released: October 28, 2020; 2. "25th" Released: November 25, 2020

A Tori Kelly Christmas is the first Christmas album and the fourth studio album, by American singer Tori Kelly. It was released on October 30, 2020, through Schoolboy and Capitol Records. It is Kelly's first Christmas album, and was executively produced by Kelly, Babyface, and Scooter Braun. The album contains cover versions of Christmas standards such as "All I Want for Christmas is You" and "Let It Snow! Let It Snow! Let It Snow!" alongside original songs which incorporate R&B elements.

A Tori Kelly Christmas received generally positive reviews from music critics, who praised the album's musical style and Kelly's vocals, comparing the latter to Mariah Carey. However, some critics felt the original songs did not reach the same standard as Kelly's covers. The album debuted at number 17 on the Billboard Top Holiday albums and received a Grammy Award nomination for Best Traditional Pop Vocal Album in 2021.

== Background and release ==
In mid-2020 during the COVID-19 pandemic, Kelly released her third extended play, Solitude. Kelly later announced that she was working on a Christmas album. On social media, Kelly noted that she has always wanted to release a Christmas album. In a press conference, it was announced the album would "include two original songs, in addition to yuletide favorites". The album was co-produced by Babyface and on working with him, Kelly stated that,

I'm so grateful to Babyface for helping me create an album that I am so proud of [...] I still can't believe that I got to work with such a legend on my first-ever Christmas album. He really brought my vision to life and made every song so special.

Before the release of the album, Kelly hosted a zoom listening party. A Tori Kelly Christmas was released on October 30.

== Composition and production ==
Kelly cited Ella Fitzgerald and Crystal Lewis as influences while creating the album. Kelly noted on her zoom listening party that it was her "first experience writing a few songs completely virtually". The Knockturnal writer, Sabine West, attended the zoom and noted that, "When deciding on songs to include on the album, [Kelly] stuck close to her roots. Many of the songs are family favorites that she grew up singing with her family around the holidays". Overall, the album consists of traditional Christmas songs along with two original songs.

=== Music and content ===
The album begins with a cover of "Silent Night" which garnered comparisons to Mariah Carey (who also began her first Christmas album with the same song), and acts as a "four-minute gospel showcase". Some critics noted its difference from the original which "is extremely slow and mellow". Kelly, however, "proudly utilizes her insane vocal cords to hit some to-die-for notes within the chorus". This is followed by "25th", the first of her two original songs. The song is "replete with jingle bells and plays off of the idea that all a person wants on Christmas is the one they love—not exactly revolutionary but still fun". This is followed by a cover of Lee Mendelson and Vince Guaraldi's "Christmas Time Is Here" from A Charlie Brown Christmas.

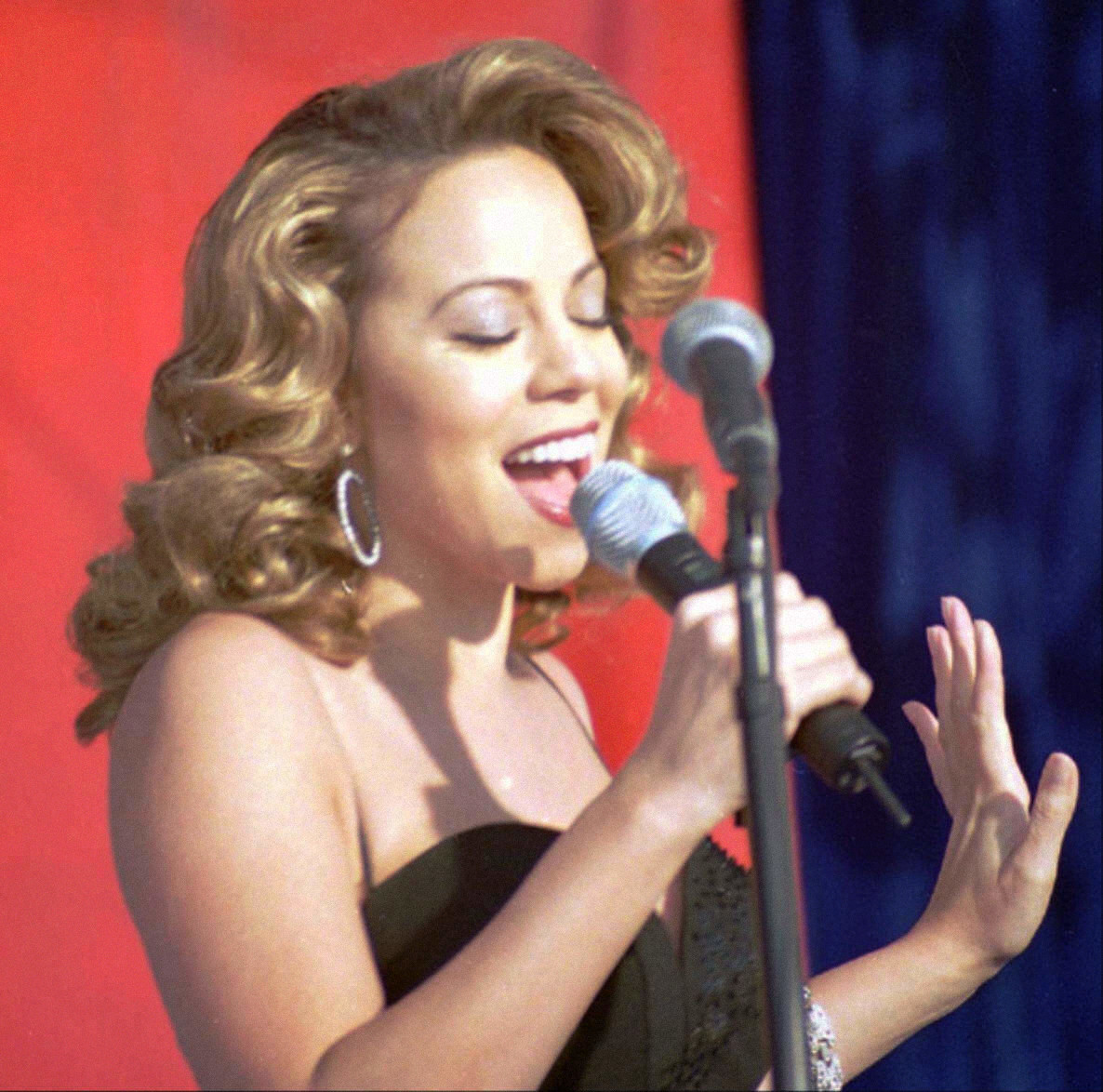
Critics compared Kelly's vocals on the album to that of Mariah Carey (pictured) who has been dubbed the "Queen of Christmas" in the media.

"Joy to the World/Joyful, Joyful" is a gospel-inspired track which was compared to her previous Grammy Award winning album, Hiding Place, which won for Best Gospel Album. Her cover of Leroy Anderson's "Sleigh Ride" is "filled with upbeat instrumentation and rumbling bass" and Piper Westrom of Riff noted that there was a "fair amount of scatting throughout that provides another comparison between herself and [Mariah Carey]". This is followed by a soothing and heartfelt cover of "O Holy Night" which is "tampered down" in comparison to other popular renditions of the song. Kelly's second original song, "Gift That Keeps on Giving" was described as a song straight out of a Hallmark Channel film and centres around love being better than any present.

"Elf Interlude" is an a cappella interpretation of the instrumental theme from Elf; Kelly has cited the Will Ferrell film as one of her all-time favorite Christmas films. This is followed by Kelly's duet with Babyface of "Let It Snow" which provided "the perfect amount of R&B fluidity and holiday spirit to make anyone begin to wish for snow and hot cocoa". This is followed by "O Come, O Come Emmanuel/O Come All Ye Faithful" which was "key to keeping the festive album from becoming exasperatingly cheery". The song "highlights the power of [Kelly's] voice as she holds a number of long, loud notes while singing fervently".

"Go Tell It on the Mountain" is not usually a song on many Christmas albums and Riff writer Piper Westrom noted that it is usually reserved for church choirs. Despite this, Kelly "put her own pop spin on it and still maintained the gravity and significance of a song about the birth of Jesus in a way that even old-school carolers will likely appreciate". Kelly covered Donny Hathaway's "This Christmas" which was compared to Christina Aguilera's version on her 2000 Christmas album, My Kind of Christmas. Kelly's version of the song additionally sampled and used elements from "Merry Christmas, Happy Holidays" by NSYNC. The standard edition of the album ended with Kelly's cover of Jeff Buckley's song, Hallelujah" from the 2016 animated feature film Sing.

On the Target deluxe edition, there were two extra tracks: "Kid Again on Christmas", co-written by Wrabel is a "sentimental piano ballad" alongside a stripped-down acoustic cover of Mariah Carey's "All I Want For Christmas Is You", which Kelly called a tribute to Carey.

== Reception ==
=== Critical reception ===
Professional ratings
Review scores
Source	Rating
AllMusic	3.5/5 stars
The Daily Californian	3.5/5 stars

Upon release, the album received generally positive reviews. Riff writer Piper Westrom noted that in 2020, there was an abundant of artists releasing Christmas albums and that Kelly was "among those lending her powerful pipes to the holiday season". Westrom praised Kelly's spin on the original Christmas songs and went on to say that, "Kelly did everything right for her entry into the Christmas album genre. Her voice is powerful and silky as ever on these classics". The Daily Californian writer Daniella Lake stated that "Kelly's covers offer an engaging, contemporary spin on holiday classics" but criticised her original songs. Despite this, Lake went on to praise Kelly's versatility and noted that Kelly has since "mastered singing across multiple genres from pop to gospel, and with A Tori Kelly Christmas, she can consider the holiday genre successfully conquered".

AllMusic editor Neil Z. Yeung gave the album high praise, comparing Kelly's vocal to American singers Mariah Carey and Kelly Clarkson, going on to call the album a "pure comfort and joy for the holiday season". The Central Trend writer, Avery Jordan, noted that the album is "bound to become a classic". He adds that the world may "be hearing these soon-to-be Christmas classics on the radio for years, and Kelly will perhaps even become 2020's Mariah Carey".

=== Accolades ===
Awards	Year	Category	Result	Ref.
Grammy Award	2022	Best Traditional Pop Vocal Album	Nominated	

== Promotion ==
=== Live performances ===
On December 21, Kelly performed a holiday concert at Anaheim's Drive-In to promote the album. The Orange County Register writer Kelli Skye Fadroski praised Kelly's performance calling it "powerful and often moving". Babyface also performed as a special guest. To promote the album further, Kelly flew to New York City and made her debut in the 94th annual Macy's Thanksgiving Day Parade performing "25th" from atop a picture-perfect village on a float. On December 2, she also performed at NBC's Christmas in Rockefeller Center.

=== Singles ===
The first single for the album was a cover of "Let It Snow" featuring Babyface. It was released on October 29, 2020. "25th" was released as the second single of the album on November 25, 2020. A music video was released on November 26, 2020 and was directed by Jo Roy.

== Track listing ==
All tracks are produced by Tori Kelly, Babyface and Demonte Posey, except where noted.

A Tori Kelly Christmas track listing
No.	Title	Writer(s)	Producer(s)	Length
1.	"Silent Night"	Franz Xaver Gruber; Joseph Mohr		4:16
2.	"25th"	Victoria Kelly; Wendy Wang; Casey Smith	Wang	3:46
3.	"Christmas Time Is Here"	Vince Guaraldi; Lee Mendelson		3:03
4.	"Joy to the World/Joyful, Joyful"	Traditional		3:40
5.	"Sleigh Ride"	Leroy Anderson		3:05
6.	"O Holy Night"	Traditional		4:53
7.	"Gift That Keeps On Giving"	Kelly; Jimmy Robbins; Nicolle Galyon		3:11
8.	"Elf Interlude"	John Debney	Kelly	0:49
9.	"Let It Snow" (featuring Babyface)	Sammy Cahn; Jule Styne		1:58
10.	"O Come, O Come Emmanuel/O Come All Ye Faithful"	Traditional		3:10
11.	"Go Tell It on the Mountain"	Traditional		2:48
12.	"This Christmas"	Donny Hathaway; Justin Timberlake; JC Chasez; Nadine McKinnor; Veit Renn; Vincent DeGiorgio		3:29
13.	"Hallelujah" (from Sing: Original Motion Picture Soundtrack)	Leonard Cohen		3:28
Total length:				41:36

Deluxe / Target edition
No.	Title	Writer(s)	Producer(s)	Length
14.	"Kid Again on Christmas"	Kelly; Wrabel	Spencer Stewart; Kelly	3:04
15.	"All I Want for Christmas Is You"	Mariah Carey; Walter Afanasieff	Stewart; Kelly	3:50
Total length:				48:38

Samples credits

- "Elf Interlude" contains elements from the main title of Elf
- "This Christmas" contains elements of "Merry Christmas, Happy Holidays" by NSYNC

== Charts ==
Chart performance for A Tori Kelly Christmas
Chart (2020)	Peak position
US Billboard 200	192
US Top Holiday Albums (Billboard)	17

== Release history ==
Release history for A Tori Kelly Christmas
Region	Date	Format	Version	Label	Ref.
Various	October 30, 2020	Digital download; streaming	Standard	Capitol; Schoolboy	
Various	October 29, 2021	LP; Digital download; streaming	Deluxe	Capitol; Schoolboy	
