= Unbothered (song) =

2020 single by Tori Kelly

Single by Tori Kelly

from the EP Solitude
- Released: August 11, 2020
- Recorded: 2020
- Genre: Pop
- Length: 3:23
- Label: Capitol; School Boy
- Songwriters: Chloe George; Jorgen Odegard; Micah Premnath; Tori Kelly
- Producer: Jorgen Odegard

Tori Kelly singles chronology
"Running Outta Love" (2020)	"Unbothered" (2020)	"Let It Snow!" (2020)

Lyric video
- "Unbothered" on YouTube

"Unbothered" is a song by American singer Tori Kelly. The track was released as the second single from her third extended play (EP), Solitude, on August 11, 2020.

== Background ==
Jorgen Odegard wrote some of the song and produced the entirety of it, while Kelly recorded it all from her home.

Other writers include Chloe George and Micah Premnath.

== Performances ==
Kelly performed the single on The Late Late Show with James Corden on August 13. She performed "Unbothered" the next day, August 14, on The Late Show with Stephen Colbert.

== Charts ==
Chart performance for "Unbothered"
Chart (2020)	Peak position
New Zealand Hot Singles (RMNZ)	33
