= Blink of an Eye (Tori Kelly song) =

Song by Tori Kelly
- Released: July 10, 2016
- Recorded: July 2016
- Genre: Acoustic; ballad
- Length: 3:18
- Songwriters: Tori Kelly; Zac Poor

"Blink of an Eye" is a song by American singer and songwriter Tori Kelly. Musically, the song is an acoustic ballad. It was written by Kelly and Zac Poor, and was released via Kelly's YouTube channel on July 10, 2016.

"Blink of an Eye" is Kelly's tribute to fellow musician Christina Grimmie. Grimmie was murdered following a concert appearance in Orlando, Florida, exactly one month prior to the song's release.

== Background ==
On June 10, 2016, YouTube artist and The Voice season 6 alumna Christina Grimmie was shot by an infatuated "fan" as she signed autographs during a meet and greet event following her performance at The Plaza Live in Orlando, Florida. Grimmie was pronounced dead about thirty minutes later, and her death was reported early the following morning.

Numerous artists and others in the music industry posted tributes to Grimmie via their social media accounts. Kelly tweeted, "I have no words. RIP Christina. See you again, love. Isaiah 25:8". (Note: New King James Version: "He will swallow up death forever, and the Lord God will wipe away tears from all faces; The rebuke of His people He will take away from all the earth; For the Lord has spoken.")

Kelly had met Grimmie through their mutual friends, and the women had similar careers; Grimmie's death "at a meet and greet was also just so close to home." Though the song is specific to Grimmie, Kelly wrote, "more recently I'm overwhelmed at the pain and the brokenness in the world today, and so this is really just me grieving. At all of it. Life is so short."

== Release ==
For the music video, Kelly sat with a guitar in near-darkness.

"Blink of an Eye" was released through Kelly's YouTube channel on July 10, 2016, one month after Grimmie's death. Kelly wrote in the caption that the song was something she needed to write. "My heart was and is still so heavy when I think of her not being with us. However, I am still comforted knowing that I'll get to see her again someday in Heaven."

For the video, Kelly sat in near-darkness singing and playing a guitar. Within a month after its release, it had been viewed more than 1,000,000 times.

== Reception ==
Billboard called "Blink of an Eye" a "beautiful yet heartbreaking song in [Grimmie's] memory." Matthew Scott Donnelly wrote that the song "has the beautiful frailty of stained glass ... the lo-fi, guitar-backed performance is powerful for its restraint." Music Times said the video is not "flashy" like Kelly's previous work, but "its simplistic and solemn nature works very well with the seriousness of the song and its context."

Justin Bieber, who knew Grimmie through mutual friend Selena Gomez, tweeted his approval: "You have a special gift. God bless."
