= Time Flies (Drake song) =

2020 single by Drake

Song by Drake

from the album Dark Lane Demo Tapes
- Released: May 1, 2020
- Recorded: 2020
- Genre: R&B
- Length: 3:19
- Label: Republic; OVO Sound
- Songwriters: Aubrey Graham; Ozan Yıldırım
- Producer: OZ

"Time Flies" is a song by Drake from his mixtape Dark Lane Demo Tapes.

The song was a top 30 hit in both Canada and US, peaking at No. 22 and No. 30, respectively.

== Chart performance ==
Chart (2020)	Peak position
Canada Hot 100 (Billboard)	22
France (SNEP)	152
Portugal (AFP)	87
UK Audio Streaming (OCC)	34
US Billboard Hot 100	30
US Hot R&B/Hip-Hop Songs (Billboard)	17
US Rolling Stone Top 100	12

== Certifications ==
Certifications for "Time Flies"
Region	Certification	Certified units/sales
Australia (ARIA)	Platinum	70,000^{‡}
United Kingdom (BPI)	Silver	200,000^{‡}
^{‡} Sales+streaming figures based on certification alone.

== Tori Kelly version ==
"Time Flies"

Single by Tori Kelly

from the EP Solitude
- Released: July 22, 2020
- Recorded: 2020
- Genre: R&B
- Length: 3:19
- Label: Capitol
- Songwriters: Aubrey Graham; Ozan Yıldırım
- Producer: Tori Kelly

Tori Kelly singles chronology
"Together" (2020)	"Time Flies" (2020)	"Running Outta Love" (2020)

Music video
- "Time Flies (Visualizer)" on YouTube

Tori Kelly covered the song for her extended play Solitude. It was released as a single on July 22, 2020.

The day before its release, Kelly posted a YouTube video covering Drake's song "Time Flies". It was revealed that it would be a single for her upcoming EP, Solitude.
