= Foreword (Tori Kelly EP) =

EP by Tori Kelly
- Released: October 22, 2013
- Recorded: 2013
- Genre: Pop; R&B
- Length: 16:09
- Label: Capitol

Tori Kelly chronology
| Handmade Songs by Tori Kelly (2012) | Foreword (2013) | Unbreakable Smile (2015) |

Singles from Foreword
- 1. "Dear No One" Released: October 23, 2013

Foreword is the second extended play (EP) and major label debut by American singer and songwriter Tori Kelly. It serves as her first release after signing in September 2013. The EP was released on October 22, 2013, through Capitol Records.

The EP was preceded by the single "Dear No One", which was released as iTunes' "Free Single of the Week" on October 23, 2013. Foreword debuted and peaked at number 16 on the US Billboard 200.

== Composition ==
"I decided to name this EP Foreword because to me it is an introduction to something bigger that is coming in the future."

—Kelly on why she titled the EP Foreword.

In September 2013, it was announced that Kelly had signed to Capitol Records, after hiring Scooter Braun as her manager. That same month, she announced that her major-label debut would be released in October. In an interview with Vibe, Kelly stated that the EP has a "double meaning", and a representation of a succession from her debut Handmade Songs by Tori Kelly (2012). Foreword's material was described by Elle as a mixture of pop, R&B, and soul music. Kelly said that every track was composed in different way; some in her bedroom, some with guitar in hand. Her favorite track on the EP from a writing perspective is "Paper Hearts".

== Promotion ==
To promote Foreword, Kelly was the sole supporting act for Ed Sheeran at his Madison Square Garden show in November 2013. On December 12, 2013, she appeared on The Queen Latifah Show, where she spoke about the EP and performed "Dear No One".

== Singles ==
"Dear No One" was released on October 23, 2013, as the EP's lead single. It was also featured as the iTunes Store's "Free Single of the Week" for October 23.

== Critical reception ==
Critic Mark Deming said that the release gave "a new sophistication to her sound without interfering with her subtle, emotionally expressive power as a vocalist and songwriter."

== Track listing ==
All tracks are written and produced by Tori Kelly.

| No. | Title | Length |
|---|---|---|
| 1. | "Rocket" | 2:21 |
| 2. | "Dear No One" | 3:17 |
| 3. | "Treasure" | 3:12 |
| 4. | "Paper Hearts" | 3:19 |
| 5. | "Daydream" | 4:00 |
| Total length: | | 16:09 |

== Charts ==
Chart performance for Foreword
| Chart (2013) | Peak position |
|---|---|
| US Billboard 200 | 16 |
| US Digital Albums (Billboard) | 7 |

== Release history ==
| Region | Date | Format(s) | Label | Ref. |
|---|---|---|---|---|
| United States | October 22, 2013 | Digital download CD | Capitol | |
