= Handmade Songs =

EP by Tori Kelly
- Released: May 1, 2012
- Recorded: 2012
- Genre: Pop; R&B
- Length: 22:18
- Label: Toraay

Tori Kelly chronology
Handmade Songs (2012)	Foreword (2013)

Singles from Handmade Songs
- 1. "Confetti" Released: April 12, 2012

Handmade Songs (stylized as Handmade Songs by Tori Kelly) is the first extended play (EP) by American singer Tori Kelly. The EP was released on May 1, 2012, through the record label Toraay Records.

The EP was preceded by the single "Confetti". Handmade Songs by Tori Kelly debuted and peaked at number 9 on the US Top Heatseekers.

== Track listing ==
All tracks are written and produced by Tori Kelly.

No.	Title	Length
1.	"Stained"	3:41
2.	"Eyelashes"	4:26
3.	"All in My Head"	3:30
4.	"Confetti"	3:58
5.	"Celestial"	3:24
6.	"Upside Down"	3:19
Total length:		22:18

== Release history ==
Region	Date	Format(s)	Label	Ref.
United States	May 1, 2012	Digital download CD	Toraay Records	

== Charts ==
Chart performance for Handmade Songs
Chart (2012)	Peak position
US Heatseekers Albums (Billboard)	9
