= Sing: Original Motion Picture Soundtrack =

Soundtrack album by Joby Talbot
- Released: December 9, 2016
- Genres: Pop; rock; R&B
- Length: 107:43
- Label: Republic
- Producer: Joby Talbot

Joby Talbot chronology
Closed Circuit (2013)	Sing: Original Motion Picture Soundtrack (2016)	Sing 2: Original Motion Picture Soundtrack (2021)

Singles from Sing: Original Motion Picture Soundtrack
- 1. "Faith" Released: November 4, 2016; 2. "Don't You Worry 'bout a Thing (Tori Kelly version)" Released: March 3, 2017

Sing: Original Motion Picture Soundtrack is the soundtrack to the 2016 animated musical film Sing. The soundtrack includes classic songs performed by the film's main cast as well as the song "Faith", which was written specifically for the movie and performed by Stevie Wonder and Ariana Grande. The soundtrack was released by Republic Records on December 9, 2016, while the film was released on December 21, 2016.

The film's score was composed by Joby Talbot.

== Track listing ==
=== Standard edition ===
No.	Title	Writer(s)	Performer(s)	Length
1.	"Faith"	Ryan Tedder, Benny Blanco, Francis Farewell Starlite	Stevie Wonder & Ariana Grande	2:42
2.	"Gimme Some Lovin'"	Steve Winwood, Spencer Davis & Muff Winwood	The Spencer Davis Group	2:54
3.	"The Way I Feel Inside"	Rod Argent	Taron Egerton	1:28
4.	"Let's Face the Music and Dance"	Irving Berlin	Seth MacFarlane	2:54
5.	"I Don't Wanna"	Garth Jennings & Dave Bassett	Scarlett Johansson & Beck Bennett	1:24
6.	"Venus"	Robbie van Leeuwen	Reese Witherspoon & Nick Kroll	2:30
7.	"Auditions"		Sing Cast	2:47
8.	"Bamboléo"	Simón Diaz, Chico Bouchikhi & Nicolas Reyes	Gipsy Kings	3:25
9.	"Hallelujah"	Leonard Cohen	Tori Kelly	3:27
10.	"Under Pressure"	Freddie Mercury, Brian May, Roger Taylor, John Deacon & David Bowie	Queen & David Bowie	4:05
11.	"Shake It Off"	Taylor Swift, Max Martin & Shellback	Nick Kroll & Reese Witherspoon	2:00
12.	"I'm Still Standing"	Elton John (music) & Bernie Taupin (lyrics)	Taron Egerton	3:07
13.	"Set It All Free"	Dave Bassett	Scarlett Johansson	3:34
14.	"My Way"	Paul Anka, Claude François & Jacques Revaux	Seth MacFarlane	4:16
15.	"Don't You Worry 'bout a Thing"	Stevie Wonder	Tori Kelly	4:01
16.	"Golden Slumbers/Carry That Weight"	Lennon–McCartney	Jennifer Hudson	3:40

Sing: Original Motion Picture Soundtrack — Target exclusive (bonus tracks)
No.	Title	Writer(s)	Performer(s)	Length
17.	"Pennies from Heaven"	Arthur Johnston & Johnny Burke	Seth MacFarlane
18.	"Pon de Floor"		Major Lazer & Vybz Kartel

=== Deluxe edition ===
No.	Title	Writer(s)	Performer(s)	Length
1.	"Faith"	Stevie Wonder, Ariana Grande, Ryan Tedder, Benny Blanco, Francis Farewell Starlite	Stevie Wonder & Ariana Grande	2:42
2.	"Gimme Some Lovin'"	Steve Winwood, Spencer Davis & Muff Winwood	The Spencer Davis Group	2:54
3.	"The Way I Feel Inside"	Rod Argent	Taron Egerton	1:28
4.	"Let's Face the Music and Dance"	Irving Berlin	Seth MacFarlane	2:54
5.	"I Don't Wanna"	Garth Jennings & David Bassett	Scarlett Johansson & Beck Bennett	1:24
6.	"Venus"	Robbie van Leeuwen	Reese Witherspoon & Nick Kroll	2:30
7.	"Auditions"		Sing Cast	2:47
8.	"Around the World"	Thomas Bangalter & Guy-Manuel de Homem-Christo	Señor Coconut & his Orchestra	2:46
9.	"Bamboléo"	Tonino Baliardo, Chico Bouchikhi & Nicolas Reyes	Gipsy Kings	3:25
10.	"The Wind"		Cat Stevens	1:43
11.	"Hallelujah"	Leonard Cohen	Tori Kelly	3:27
12.	"Under Pressure"	Freddie Mercury, Brian May, Roger Taylor, John Deacon & David Bowie	Queen & David Bowie	4:05
13.	"Shake It Off"	Taylor Swift, Max Martin & Shellback	Nick Kroll & Reese Witherspoon	2:00
14.	"I'm Still Standing"	Elton John (music) & Bernie Taupin (lyrics)	Taron Egerton	3:07
15.	"Set It All Free"	Dave Bassett	Scarlett Johansson	3:34
16.	"My Way"	Paul Anka, Claude François, Jacques Revaux & Gilles Thibault	Seth MacFarlane	4:16
17.	"Don't You Worry 'bout a Thing"	Stevie Wonder	Tori Kelly	4:01
18.	"Golden Slumbers/Carry That Weight"	Lennon–McCartney	Jennifer Hudson	3:40
19.	"Out to Lunch (End Titles)"		Joby Talbot	4:24
20.	"Listen to the Music"	Tom Johnston	Tiki Pasillas	2:15
21.	"Hallelujah" (duet version)		Jennifer Hudson & Tori Kelly	3:28
22.	"Don't You Worry 'bout a Thing" (acoustic version)		Tori Kelly	3:17
23.	"Oh.My.Gosh"	Onika Maraj, Jamal Jones, Jonathan Solone-Myvett, Ernest Clark, Marcos Palacios & Sir Mix-a-Lot	The Bunnies	2:11

== Charts ==
=== Weekly charts ===
Chart (2016–17)	Peak position
Australian Albums (ARIA)	2
Belgian Albums (Ultratop Flanders)	106
Canadian Albums (Billboard)	23
Japanese International Albums (Oricon)	2
New Zealand Albums (RMNZ)	10
South Korean Albums (Gaon)	41
South Korean Albums International (Gaon)	3
Spanish Albums (Promusicae)	83
UK Soundtrack Albums (Official Charts)	6
US Digital Albums (Billboard)	3
US Billboard 200	8
US Kid Albums (Billboard)	2
US Soundtrack Albums (Billboard)	2

=== Year-end charts ===
Chart (2017)	Position
Australian Albums (ARIA)	15
US Billboard 200	65
US Soundtrack Albums (Billboard)	8

Chart (2018)	Position
US Soundtrack Albums (Billboard)	15

== Certifications ==
Region	Certification	Certified units/sales
Australia (ARIA)	Gold	35,000^{^}
Denmark (IFPI Danmark)	Gold	10,000^{‡}
United Kingdom (BPI)	Gold	100,000^{‡}
^{^} Shipments figures based on certification alone.^{‡} Sales+streaming figures based on certification alone.
