= Inspired by True Events =

Studio album by Tori Kelly
- Released: August 9, 2019
- Genre: R&B
- Length: 44:56
- Labels: Capitol; Schoolboy
- Producers: Tori Kelly; Mike Elizondo; Dante Jones; Jimmy Napes; Noel Zancanella

Tori Kelly chronology
Hiding Place (2018)	Inspired by True Events (2019)	Solitude (2020)

Singles from Inspired By True Events
- 1. "Change Your Mind" Released: January 25, 2019; 2. "Sorry Would Go A Long Way" Released: June 28, 2019; 3. "Language" Released: July 19, 2019

Professional ratings
Review scores
Source	Rating
AllMusic	4/5 stars

Inspired by True Events is the third studio album by American singer Tori Kelly. It was released on August 9, 2019, through Schoolboy and Capitol Records. The album is a coming-of-age record, interspersed with deeply personal moments and encapsulates her experiences with marriage, divorce and public scrutiny. The album is primarily influenced by R&B-soul and contains blues, pop, and contemporary-gospel influences.

== Background ==
After releasing her debut album in 2015, Unbreakable Smile, Kelly released Hiding Place, a gospel album co-written & produced with Kirk Franklin.

In 2018, Kelly married basketball player André Murillo, as well as experienced her parents' divorce & the death of her grandfather. These events served for much of the inspiration behind the album.

Kelly worked with Jimmy Napes on much of the album, as well as with Bruno Major, Justin Tranter, and Tayla Parx, among others.

== Release ==
On June 27, 2019, Kelly announced her third studio album would be released on August 9, 2019. On November 6, 2019, she announced on Instagram that the two deluxe tracks would be released for streaming that Friday.

== Singles ==
On January 18, 2019, Kelly announced she would be releasing her first single titled "Change Your Mind" on January 25, 2019.

Her second single, "Sorry Would Go A Long Way", was released on June 28, 2019.

On July 19, 2019, the third single, "Language", was released digitally.

A week before her album was released, Kelly released a promotional single titled "2 Places" and debuted it exclusively on Apple Music's Beats 1.

== Promotion ==
Kelly released the lead single for the album on January 25, 2019 titled "Change Your Mind".

She then went on a two-month promotional tour called The Acoustic Sessions where she performed some unreleased songs along with her top hits.

On June 28, Kelly released "Sorry Would Go A Long Way" which was the second single. The third and final single for the album, "Language", was released on July 19.

On August 9, Kelly performed "Change Your Mind", "Language", & "Sorry Would Go A Long Way" on Today. She also performed "Sorry Would Go A Long Way" on The Late Show with Stephen Colbert on August 15, 2019.

She will be on the Inspired by True Events tour in 2020.

== Track listing ==
Inspired By True Events – Standard edition
No.	Title	Writer(s)	Producer(s)	Length
1.	"Coffee"	Victoria Kelly; Taylor Parks; Nathaniel Campany; Noel Zancanella	Tori Kelly; Jimmy Napes	4:09
2.	"12/16/1992"	Kelly	Kelly	0:18
3.	"Change Your Mind"	Kelly; James Napier	Napes	2:57
4.	"Language"	Kelly; Justin Tranter; Audra Mae	Kelly; Napes	4:24
5.	"2 Places"	Kelly; Parks; Campany; Zancanella	Zancanella	3:01
6.	"8/28/1997"	Kelly; Napier	Kelly; Napes	1:16
7.	"Kid I Used To Know"	Kelly; Ashley Gorley; Mike Elizondo	Kelly; Napes; Elizondo	4:26
8.	"Pretty Fades"	Kelly; Hayley Warner; Britten Newbill	Kelly; Napes; Elizondo	3:22
9.	"3/2/1991"	Kelly; Napier	Kelly; Napes	0:55
10.	"Sorry Would Go A Long Way"	Kelly; Benjamin Edwards; Napier	Napes	3:11
11.	"Actress"	Kelly	Napes	2:57
12.	"The Lie"	Kelly; Dante Jones; Drew Love	Jones; Kelly	2:29
13.	"Until I Think Of You"	Kelly; Napier	Napes	2:36
14.	"3/26/1994"	Kelly; Napier	Kelly; Napes	1:25
15.	"Your Words"	Kelly; Napier	Napes	3:39
16.	"Before the Dawn"	Kelly; Edwards; Napier	Napes	3:38
Total length:				44:56

Target deluxe edition
No.	Title	Writer(s)	Producer(s)	Length
17.	"Until Forever"	Kelly; Napier; Benjamin Jones	Napes	3:03
18.	"Minute To Myself"	Kelly; Napier; Jones	Napes	3:36
Total length:				51:35

Notes

- The Target deluxe edition tracks actually do not play in CD format as there was an error during production.

== Charts ==
Chart performance for Inspired By True Events
Chart (2019)	Peak position
Australian Digital Albums (ARIA)	50
US Billboard 200	97
UK Album Downloads (Official Charts)	62

== Release history ==
List of regions, release dates, formats, labels and references
Region	Date	Formats	Edition	Label
Various	August 9, 2019	CD; LP; digital download; streaming	Standard	Capitol; Schoolboy
Various	November 8, 2019	Digital download; streaming	Deluxe	Capitol; Schoolboy
