= Hiding Place (Tori Kelly album) =

Studio album by Tori Kelly
- Released: September 14, 2018
- Genre: Gospel • R&B
- Length: 36:48
- Label: Capitol, Schoolboy
- Producer: Tori Kelly; Kirk Franklin; Rickey Offord; Ronald Hill; Max Stark

Tori Kelly chronology
Unbreakable Smile (2015)	Hiding Place (2018)	Inspired by True Events (2019)

Singles from Hiding Place
- 1. "Help Us to Love" Released: March 30, 2018; 2. "Never Alone" Released: August 23, 2018

Hiding Place is the second studio album by American singer Tori Kelly. It was released on September 14, 2018, through School Boy Records and Capitol Records. Musically, its music incorporates primarily R&B-gospel with jazz influences. Named after the Bible verse Psalm 32:7, the album centres around God being a place of safety.

Upon release, the album received critical acclaim winning the Grammy Award for Best Gospel Album at the 61st Annual Grammy Awards. The album found commercial success, debuting at number one on the Billboard Top Gospel Albums chart and at number 35 on the Billboard 200.

== Background and release ==
In April 2015, Kelly released her debut album, Unbreakable Smile to critical acclaim. In an Instagram live chat, Kelly stated that she initially planned on making the followup to Unbreakable Smile a pop album with only one gospel song. One of Kelly's inspirations was gospel artist Kirk Franklin and her manager, Scooter Braun arranged a meeting between them. Kelly quoted,

I flew out to Dallas and Kirk showed me a few songs he'd written, and I fell in love with all of them [...] Next thing you know, one song turned into us doing a whole project together. I grew up on gospel music, so the fact that a legend like Kirk Franklin would take me under his wing was just a dream come true.

Hiding Place was eventually announced on August 23. She announced the album would be released digitally on September 14, 2018.

== Composition ==
The album was recorded at Franklin's studio outside of Dallas and the songs were penned primarily by Franklin and often co-written with Kelly, marking the first time Franklin had ever co-written a song. For the title of the album, Kelly drew inspiration from Psalm 32:7, "You are a hiding place for me; you preserve me from trouble; you surround me with songs of deliverance". In an interview she noted,

That always stuck with me: this idea of God being a place of safety, a place where you can hide from all the crazy things that this world can throw at us. I want people to feel uplifted and encouraged when they listen. I want them to know that, no matter what they're going through, there is a God who loves them so much and so unconditionally, and there's always a reason to feel hope, even when you’re in a dark place.

Kelly has stated that gospel music has been an influence stating that she "grew up singing [gospel] and a lot of what makes up gospel music is a huge influence in [her] own music". On working with Kelly, Franklin stated that he has "never seen anyone that's a monster behind the microphone like [Kelly]. She'd nail one song in three takes, and all those takes were amazing [...] a lot of artists out there will rely on Auto-Tune or studio tricks, but there's no button you can push for emotion, and there's no button for skill. [Kelly] is excellent in everything she does, because she's a real, pure artist".

=== Music and lyrics ===
The album begins with "Masterpiece" which features American Christian rapper Lecrae. The song features a choir in the background and lyrically centres around "God turning our weaknesses into a masterpiece". Lecrae adds onto this theme with a rap verse which acts as a reminder "not to compare yourself with others". This is followed on by "Help Us to Love" featuring The HamilTones (a trio formed by Anthony Hamilton's background singers) which "addresses the issues of society today" discussing how people "constantly feel the need to be against each other". The Kirk Franklin produced track combines Kelly's vocals and The HamilTones' harmonies.

"Sunday" and "Just as Sure" were described as "inspirational" and the latter features Jonathan McReynolds. "Sunday" talks about how Christians should not portray themselves to others as a 'Sunday version', rather "an authentic follower of Christ who struggles at times just like everyone else". On "Just as Sure", Jonathan McReynolds voice blends with Kelly's and includes guitar arrangement with the lyrics looking at God's constant and consistent love. "Psalm 42" is based on the Bible chapter, Psalm 42 and is a ballad where Kelly reflects on the need for God to "guide her and be with her always". This leads into "Questions" which talk about issues of the soul and features a slower tempo and a melodic piano arrangement. The song talks "about coming to terms with death and questioning the presence of God" with a "fatalistic view of the world but knowing that God's plan is higher than ours".

The seventh track, "Never Alone" features Kirk Franklin and showcases Kelly's voice. The song was described as a "standout amongst the album" and an "anthem". Kelly's vocals were positively compared to the gospel singer Yolanda Adams and her song "I Believe". The album ends with a remixed cover of the hymn "It Is Well with My Soul" titled "Soul's Anthem (It is Well)". Lyrically, the song acts as a reminder "about surrendering complete control to God and allowing your soul to rest in His grace".

== Critical reception ==
Professional ratings
Review scores
Source	Rating
AllMusic	3.5/5 stars

Upon release, the album received critical acclaim. Vibe writer Desire Thompson wrote that Kelly's "talent transcends genres" and that while her debut album was "dipped in candy-coated pop vocals and soul", Hiding Place "takes her back home with dynamic vocals and professions of the loving gospel". The Triangle writer Samantha Burgess called the album "simple but soulful and lyrically rich". Sidelines writer Ladiah Thomas also praised the album noting that "the energy and emotion that [Kelly] put into all her songs is felt through her lyrics".

The Tiger's Roar writer Devante Brittian praised "Questions" and "Soul's Anthem (It Is Well)" noting that, "you do not have to be a believer to appreciate this album, and the star power [Kelly] brings to Hiding Place will leave you a forever fan of her work". At the 2019 Grammy Awards, the album received two Grammys. One for Best Gospel Album and the other for Best Gospel Performance/Song for the song "Never Alone".

=== Accolades ===
Awards	Year	Category	Result	Ref.
Billboard Music Awards	2019	Top Gospel Album	Won	
Grammy Award	2019	Best Gospel Album	Won	
NAACP Image Awards	2019	Outstanding Gospel/Christian Album	Nominated	

== Commercial performance ==
Upon release, the album debuted atop the Billboard Top Gospel Albums chart and was the highest-selling gospel album of 2018, selling over 15,000 album-equivalent units in its first week. The album also topped Billboard's Gospel Streaming Songs and Gospel Digital Song Sales charts.

== Promotion ==
To promote the album, Kelly made many televised appearances. She performed "Never Alone" on The Late Late Show with James Corden along with Kirk Franklin and performed at the 49th GMA Dove Awards held on October 16, 2018. She began the Hiding Place tour two days later on October 18. She also performed "Questions" on Good Morning America.

=== Singles ===
On March 30, 2018, Kelly released the first single off the album titled, "Help Us to Love", featuring The HamilTones. The second single, "Never Alone", was released on August 24, following the announcement of its release a week before. A music video for the song "Psalm 42" was released on September 7.

== Track listing ==
Hiding Place track listing
No.	Title	Writer(s)	Producer(s)	Length
1.	"Masterpiece" (featuring Lecrae)	Kirk Franklin; Lecrae Moore	Franklin; Max Stark; Ronald Hill	4:44
2.	"Help Us to Love" (featuring The HamilTones)	Franklin	Franklin; Rickey Offord; Hill	3:46
3.	"Sunday"	Tori Kelly; Franklin	Franklin; Stark; Hill	3:35
4.	"Just as Sure" (featuring Jonathan McReynolds)	Franklin	Franklin; Stark; Hill	5:30
5.	"Psalm 42"	Kelly; Franklin	Franklin; Stark; Hill	5:34
6.	"Questions"	Franklin	Franklin; Stark; Hill	4:50
7.	"Never Alone" (featuring Kirk Franklin)	Kelly; Franklin	Franklin; Stark; Hill	3:34
8.	"Soul's Anthem (It Is Well)"	Kelly; Franklin; Philip Bliss (uncredited)	Franklin; Stark; Hill	5:15
Total length:				36:48

== Charts ==
=== Weekly charts ===
Weekly chart performance for Hiding Place
Chart (2018)	Peak position
Australian Digital Albums (ARIA)	10
UK Album Downloads (OCC)	44
UK Christian & Gospel Albums (OCC)	1
US Billboard 200	35
US Top Gospel Albums (Billboard)	1

=== Year-end charts ===
2018 year-end chart performance for Hiding Place
Chart (2018)	Position
US Top Gospel Albums (Billboard)	5

2019 year-end chart performance for Hiding Place
Chart (2019)	Position
US Top Gospel Albums (Billboard)	4

2020 year-end chart performance for Hiding Place
Chart (2020)	Position
US Top Gospel Albums (Billboard)	24

=== Decade-end charts ===
Decade-end chart performance for Hiding Place
Chart (2010–2019)	Position
US Top Gospel Albums (Billboard)	37

== Release history ==
Release history for Hiding Place
Region	Date	Format	Label	Ref.
Various	October 30, 2020	CD; digital download; streaming	Capitol; Schoolboy	
