= Chloe George =

American musician

Chloe George, born Chloe Gasparini, is an American musician from Los Angeles. George rose to fame after a cover of "Ghost Town" she posted on TikTok went viral. George has co-written songs with artists such as Dua Lipa and Normani.

== History ==
George attended the New York University Tisch School of the Arts. George signed to the Fader Label in 2021, where she released her first song titled Peachi. George released her debut EP in 2022 titled Penny.
