= DialIdol =

- Screen shot of DialIdol software
- Original author(s): James Hellriegel Jr.
- Stable release: v3.5.0.0
- Operating system: Windows ME/2000/XP/2003/Vista
- Website: http://www.dialidol.com

DialIdol is both the name of a computer program for Microsoft Windows and its associated website that tracks voting trends for American Idol contestants. The program allows users to automatically vote for the American Idol contestants of their choice using their PC's modem. The program then reports back to the main website, which keeps track of the results based on the percentage of calls for each contestant that result in a busy signal. DialIdol assumes that more busy signals means more callers are attempting to vote for that contestant. DialIdol was created during the fourth season of American Idol and was released to the public at the start of the fifth season.

Users can choose to vote equally for their chosen contestants, choose to keep certain contestants "safe" (by voting for their chosen contestant who is ranked the lowest), or choose to keep certain contestants "unsafe" (by voting for the lowest-ranked contestant who is not on their list).

In addition to American Idol, the software and website may also be used to vote, as well as track voting trends for, Dancing with the Stars, So You Think You Can Dance, and The X Factor. In 2006, DialIdol also supported Celebrity Duets and Canadian Idol. DialIdol did not support So You Think You Can Dance season 8.

== Notable predictions ==
=== Season 4 ===
- For its first ever prediction, in the final 6, DialIdol predicted that either Constantine Maroulis or Vonzell Solomon would be eliminated. Maroulis was eliminated.
- In the final 4, DialIdol incorrectly predicted that Vonzell Solomon would be eliminated. Anthony Fedorov was eliminated.
- In the final 3, DialIdol correctly predicted that Vonzell Solomon would be eliminated.
- In the finale, DialIdol correctly predicted that Carrie Underwood would win.

=== Season 5 ===
- In the final 16, DialIdol incorrectly predicted that Lisa Tucker would be one of the two female semifinalists eliminated along with Kinnik Sky. Kinnik Sky was eliminated, but Ayla Brown was the other female semifinalist eliminated. On the other hand, DialIdol correctly predicted that Gedeon McKinney and Will Makar would be the two male semifinalists eliminated.
- In the final 12, DialIdol predicted that either Ace Young, Kevin Covais, or Lisa Tucker would be eliminated and that Melissa McGhee would make it through. Melissa McGhee was eliminated.
- In the final 11, DialIdol incorrectly predicted that Elliott Yamin would be eliminated. Kevin Covais was eliminated.
- In the final 9, DialIdol predicted a bottom three of Paris Bennett, Elliott Yamin, and Mandisa, with only Yamin and Mandisa considered to be at risk. All three were in the bottom three, with Mandisa being eliminated and Bennett being sent to safety before Yamin.
- In the final 8, DialIdol predicted that either Bucky Covington or Ace Young would be eliminated. Bucky Covington was eliminated.
- In the final 7, DialIdol correctly predicted that Ace Young would be eliminated.
- In the final 6, DialIdol predicted that either Paris Bennett or Kellie Pickler would be eliminated, with Paris guaranteed to be in the bottom two and Kellie also guaranteed to be in the bottom three if one was declared. Kellie Pickler was eliminated and Paris Bennett was in the bottom two.
- In the final 5, DialIdol predicted that either Paris Bennett or Katharine McPhee would be eliminated. Paris Bennett was eliminated.
- In the final 4, DialIdol predicted that either Chris Daughtry or Katharine McPhee would be eliminated and that if a bottom two was declared, it would consist of those two. Chris Daughtry was eliminated and he and Katharine were indeed the bottom two.
- In the final 3, DialIdol correctly predicted that Taylor Hicks would make it to the finale. Hicks advanced along with Katharine McPhee.
- In the finale, DialIdol correctly predicted that Taylor Hicks would win.

=== Season 6 ===
- In the final 24, DialIdol incorrectly predicted that Alaina Alexander would be one of the two female semifinalists eliminated. Nicole Tranquillo and Amy Krebs were eliminated.
- In the final 12, DialIdol did not make any definitive predictions as to who would be eliminated, but predicted that Melinda Doolittle, LaKisha Jones, and Sanjaya Malakar would all be safe and not in the bottom three. Brandon Rogers was eliminated, but Sanjaya was in the bottom three.
- In the final 11, DialIdol predicted that either Jordin Sparks, Chris Richardson, Stephanie Edwards, Chris Sligh, Gina Glocksen or Haley Scarnato would be eliminated. Stephanie Edwards was eliminated.
- In the final 9, DialIdol predicted that either Phil Stacey, Sanjaya Malakar, Chris Richardson, Blake Lewis, Jordin Sparks, Haley Scarnato, LaKisha Jones or Gina Glocksen would be eliminated. Gina Glocksen was eliminated.
- In the final 6, two people were due to be eliminated. DialIdol predicted that two of Phil Stacey, Melinda Doolittle, Chris Richardson and LaKisha Jones would be eliminated. Chris Richardson and Phil Stacey were eliminated.
- In the final 4, DialIdol predicted that either Melinda Doolittle or LaKisha Jones would be eliminated. LaKisha Jones was eliminated.
- In the final 3, DialIdol did not make any prediction. Melinda Doolittle was eliminated.
- In the finale, DialIdol correctly predicted that Jordin Sparks would win.

=== Season 7 ===
- In the final 8, DialIdol predicted that either Brooke White, David Cook, Michael Johns, Syesha Mercado or Carly Smithson would be eliminated. Michael Johns was eliminated.
- In the final 7, DialIdol predicted that Brooke White and Syesha Mercado would both be in the bottom three along with either Carly Smithson or Kristy Lee Cook, but that Cook was not in danger. Both White and Mercado were in the bottom three as predicted, but Kristy Lee Cook was eliminated, producing an incorrect prediction.
- In the final 6, DialIdol predicted that either David Archuleta, Syesha Mercado, Jason Castro, Brooke White or Carly Smithson would be eliminated. Carly Smithson was eliminated.
- In the final 5, DialIdol predicted that either David Archuleta, Jason Castro, or Brooke White would be eliminated. Brooke White was eliminated.
- In the final 4, DialIdol correctly predicted that Jason Castro would be eliminated.
- In the final 3, DialIdol correctly predicted that Syesha Mercado would be eliminated.
- In the finale, DialIdol correctly predicted that David Cook would win.

=== Season 8 ===
- In the first semifinal group, DialIdol predicted that the top vote-getters in each gender would be Danny Gokey and Alexis Grace and predicted that the third advancer would be Michael Sarver, Anoop Desai, Ricky Braddy, or Brent Keith. Danny Gokey, Alexis Grace, and Michael Sarver advanced.
- In the second semifinal group, DialIdol predicted that the top vote-getters in each gender were Allison Iraheta and Adam Lambert. Both advanced along with Kris Allen.
- In the third semifinal group, DialIdol predicted that the top vote-getters in each gender were Lil Rounds and Scott MacIntyre. Both advanced along with Jorge Nunez.
- In the final 11, DialIdol predicted that either Megan Joy, Allison Iraheta or Alexis Grace would be eliminated. Alexis Grace was eliminated.
- In the final 10, DialIdol had its only inaccurate prediction of the season. Matt Giraud was definitively predicted to be safe and not in the bottom 3, but he was actually the second lowest vote getter.
- In the final 7 (i), DialIdol predicted that either Kris Allen, Matt Giraud, Allison Iraheta, Anoop Desai, Adam Lambert or Lil Rounds would be eliminated. Matt Giraud received the lowest number of votes, but was saved by the judges.
- In the final 4, DialIdol predicted that either Danny Gokey, Allison Iraheta or Kris Allen would be eliminated. Allison Iraheta was eliminated.
- In the finale, DialIdol did not make any prediction. Kris Allen won.

=== Season 9 ===
- In the final 9 (i), DialIdol did not make a prediction. Michael Lynche received the lowest number of votes, but was saved by the judges.
- In the final 3, DialIdol correctly predicted that Casey James would be eliminated.
- In the finale, DialIdol correctly predicted that Lee DeWyze would win.

=== Season 10 ===
- For the top 24, DialIdol predicted that both Tatynisa Wilson and Julie Zorrilla were definitely safe, Tatynisa particularly so, but both were sent home. This broke a long streak of correct predictions, as DialIdol was 100% accurate in season nine. Notably, this was the first season of the program to offer online voting through Facebook. The evening before the results show, the creator of the website noted that he had reason to believe that both predictions, particularly Tatynisa's, were skewed due to unusual busy signal patterns.
- For the top 11 (i), DialIdol predicted that either Casey Abrams or Thia Megia would be eliminated. Casey Abrams was the lowest vote getter, but was saved by the judges.
- For the top 9, DialIdol predicted that either Jacob Lusk, Stefano Langone, or Paul McDonald would be eliminated and that Pia Toscano would definitely be safe and not in the bottom three. Pia Toscano was eliminated.
- From top 8 week to top 5 week, DialIdol posted updates stating that the prediction on Jacob Lusk was inflated due to low raw numbers, until Jacob was eliminated.
- For the top 7, DialIdol predicted that either Haley Reinhart, Casey Abrams, or Stefano Langone would be eliminated and that Abrams and Langone would both be in the bottom three, while Scotty McCreery and Jacob Lusk would not be (although, as stated above, they believed Jacob's numbers to be suspect). Stefano Langone was eliminated, but Casey Abrams was not in the bottom three and Jacob Lusk was.
- For the top 4, DialIdol predicted that either James Durbin or Haley Reinhart would be eliminated. James Durbin was eliminated.
- For the top three, DialIdol predicted that Scotty McCreery would make the finale, which he did.
- On the day of the finale (results), DialIdol correctly predicted Scotty McCreery had beaten Lauren Alaina.

=== Season 11 ===
- For the male side of the top 25, the DialIdol predictions were drastically changed when the Pacific Coast started voting. The margin of error was changed to apply in both directions.
- For the top 11, DialIdol predicted that either Heejun Han or Erika Van Pelt would be eliminated. Shannon Magrane was eliminated.
- For the top 10, DialIdol predicted that either Heejun Han or DeAndre Brackensick would be eliminated. Erika Van Pelt was eliminated.
- For the top 7 (i), DialIdol predicted that Joshua Ledet would make it through and not be in the bottom three and that Elise Testone would be eliminated, but they were both in the bottom three. Jessica Sanchez was the lowest vote getter, but was saved by the judges.
- For the second week of the top 7, DialIdol predicted that either Hollie Cavanagh, Elise Testone, Skylar Laine, or Colton Dixon would be eliminated. Colton Dixon was eliminated.
- For the top 5, DialIdol incorrectly predicted that Skylar Laine would make the top 4 and that Phillip Phillips would be eliminated. Skylar Laine was eliminated.
- For the top 4, DialIdol predicted that either Hollie Cavanagh, Phillip Phillips, or Joshua Ledet would be eliminated. Hollie Cavanagh was eliminated.
- For the top 3, DialIdol did not make a prediction. Joshua Ledet was eliminated.
- On the day of the finale (results), DialIdol correctly predicted that Phillip Phillips had beaten Jessica Sanchez.

=== Season 12 ===
- For the top 10, DialIdol predicted that either Burnell Taylor or Curtis Finch, Jr. would be eliminated. Finch was eliminated.
- For the top 9, DialIdol incorrectly predicted that Paul Jolley would make it through and not be in the bottom 3 and that Janelle Arthur would be eliminated. Paul Jolley was eliminated.
- For the top 8, Dialidol incorrectly predicted that Burnell Taylor would be eliminated. Devin Velez was eliminated.
- For the top 7, DialIdol correctly predicted that Burnell Taylor would be eliminated.
- For the top 6, DialIdol incorrectly predicted that Janelle Arthur would be eliminated. Lazaro Arbos was eliminated.
- For the top 5, DialIdol correctly predicted that Janelle Arthur was eliminated.
- For the top 4 (both weeks), DialIdol incorrectly predicted that Angie Miller would be eliminated. Amber Holcomb was eliminated.
- For the top 3, DialIdol correctly predicted that Angie Miller was eliminated.
- For the top 2, DialIdol correctly predicted that Candice Glover would win over Kree Harrison.

=== Season 13 ===
- For the top 2, DialIdol predicted that Jena Irene would win over Caleb Johnson. Johnson won the competition, making this the first (and/or the only) time that DialIdol made an incorrect prediction during the finale.

== Controversy ==
=== Legal challenge ===
In March 2006, DialIdol received a "cease and desist" order from Fox, who alleged copyright infringement. According to the site's creator, Jim Hellriegel, Fox's lawyers also told him that his site was acting as a potential "spoiler," as they claimed it posted results. The site was taken down temporarily. After consulting with lawyers and determining that what they were doing was legal, the Web site, with a redesigned logo and other cosmetic changes, was put back online.

=== Contestant rankings ===
Because DialIdol does not take text messages into account, and because of other problems with measuring busy signals, there exists a margin of error for each contestant's score. Because of this, often 50% or more of the contestants are predicted to be in danger of being voted off, or DialIdol does not make any prediction, as was the case for the final 3 of Season 6 (when Melinda Doolittle was eliminated) and the finale of Season 8 (when Kris Allen won). Also, DialIdol has been criticized for its impreciseness in ranking the contestants; however, the program's creator has asserted that DialIdol "was never designed to get the results slot for slot right", and stresses that DialIdol is "for entertainment purposes only".

=== Power dialing ===
According to the American Idol producers, monitors are in place to identify and remove "power dialers," which use technical enhancements to their phone systems to allow for multiple votes. DialIdol is not a power dialer, according to Fox spokeswoman Jennifer Sprague. "Using a modem dialer is not the same as ‘power dialing.' A person manually using a redial button on a standard telephone can generate as many call attempts as a modem dialer.”
