= American Idol Season 11 Highlights (Joshua Ledet EP) =

EP by Joshua Ledet
- Released: July 3, 2012
- Recorded: 2012
- Genre: Pop
- Length: 18:03
- Label: 19

American Idol Season 11 Highlights is a compilation extended play by Joshua Ledet based on some of his American Idol performances. The EP was released exclusively through Walmart and consists of a few studio recordings made by Ledet during season 11 of American Idol. It includes a duet with Phillip Phillips and performances that were well received by the judges on the show. Similar EPs were also released through Walmart by fellow contestants from the Top 5, Phillip Phillips, Jessica Sanchez, Hollie Cavanagh and Skylar Laine. As of August 2012, it has sold 90,000 copies.

== Track listing ==
No.	Title	Original artist(s)	Length
1.	"It's a Man's Man's Man's World"	James Brown	3:23
2.	"When a Man Loves a Woman"	Percy Sledge	3:43
3.	"I Wish"	Stevie Wonder	3:23
4.	"If You Don't Know Me by Now"	Harold Melvin & the Blue Notes	4:18
5.	"You've Lost That Lovin' Feelin'" (featuring Phillip Phillips)	The Righteous Brothers	2:58

== Charts ==
Chart (2012)	Peak position
U.S. Billboard 200	57
