= American Idol Season 11 Highlights (Hollie Cavanagh EP) =

EP by Hollie Cavanagh
- Released: July 3, 2012
- Recorded: 2012
- Genre: Pop
- Length: 19:36
- Label: 19

American Idol Season 11 Highlights is a compilation extended play by Hollie Cavanagh based on some of her American Idol performances. The EP was released exclusively through Walmart and consists of a few studio recordings made by Cavanagh during season 11 of American Idol. It includes a duet with DeAndre Brackensick and performances that were well received by the judges on the show. Similar EPs were also released through Walmart by fellow contestants from the Top 5, Phillip Phillips, Jessica Sanchez, Joshua Ledet and Skylar Laine. As of September 2012, it has sold 13,000 copies.

== Track listing ==
No.	Title	Original artist(s)	Length
1.	"The Power of Love"	Jennifer Rush	4:52
2.	"All the Man That I Need"	Whitney Houston	3:58
3.	"Bleeding Love"	Leona Lewis	4:32
4.	"Rolling in the Deep"	Adele	3:49
5.	"I'm So Excited" (featuring DeAndre Brackensick)	The Pointer Sisters	2:27

== Charts ==
Chart (2012)	Peak position
U.S. Billboard 200	176
