= American Idol Season 11 Highlights (Skylar Laine EP) =

EP by Skylar Laine
- Released: July 3, 2012
- Recorded: 2012
- Genre: Pop
- Length: 18:53
- Label: 19

American Idol Season 11 Highlights is a compilation extended play by Skylar Laine based on some of her American Idol performances. The EP was released exclusively through Walmart and consists of a few studio recordings made by Laine during season 11 of American Idol. It includes a duet with Colton Dixon and performances that were well received by the judges on the show. Similar EPs were also released through Walmart by fellow contestants from the Top 5, Phillip Phillips, Jessica Sanchez, Joshua Ledet and Hollie Cavanagh. As of September 2012, it has sold 33,000 copies.

== Track listing ==
No.	Title	Original artist(s)	Length
1.	"Where Do Broken Hearts Go"	Whitney Houston	4:13
2.	"Gunpowder & Lead"	Miranda Lambert	2:55
3.	"Wind Beneath My Wings"	Roger Whittaker	4:41
4.	"Didn't You Know How Much I Loved You"	Kellie Pickler	4:15
5.	"Islands in the Stream" (featuring Colton Dixon)	Kenny Rogers & Dolly Parton	2:52

== Charts ==
Chart (2012)	Peak position
U.S. Billboard 200	64
U.S. Billboard Top Country Albums	12
