= Jermaine Jones (disambiguation) =

Jermaine Jones (born 1981) is an American soccer player.

Jermaine Jones may refer to:

- Jermaine Jones (gridiron football) (born 1976), American arena football player
- Jermaine Jones (singer) (born 1986), American singer

== See also ==
- Jamaine Jones (born 1998), Australian rules footballer
