= Joe Magrane =

American baseball player and analyst (born 1964)

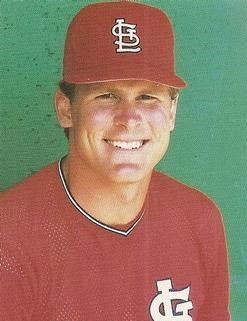
- Pitcher
- Born: July 2, 1964 (age 60); Des Moines, Iowa, U.S.
- Batted: Right Threw: Left

MLB debut
- April 25, 1987, for the St. Louis Cardinals

Last MLB appearance
- June 21, 1996, for the Chicago White Sox

MLB statistics
- Win–loss record: 57–67
- Earned run average: 3.81
- Strikeouts: 564
- Stats at Baseball Reference

Teams
- St. Louis Cardinals (1987–1993); California Angels (1993–1994); Chicago White Sox (1996)

Career highlights and awards
- NL ERA leader (1988)

Joseph David Magrane (born July 2, 1964) is an American former Major League Baseball (MLB) pitcher who played for the St. Louis Cardinals, California Angels, and Chicago White Sox between 1987 and 1996, and is currently a color commentary broadcaster for the MLB Network.

== Playing career ==
=== Amateur ===
In 1984, Magrane played collegiate summer baseball for the Harwich Mariners of the Cape Cod Baseball League (CCBL). He led the league in wins and threw six complete games. Magrane was the winning pitcher at the league's 1984 all-star game at Philadelphia's Veterans Stadium, where he pitched two shutout innings. He was inducted into the CCBL Hall of Fame in 2009.

=== Professional ===
During his rookie season, he helped the Cardinals win the 1987 National League pennant, starting Game 1 and Game 7 (the first pitcher to do so with no starts between those two games), taking the loss in Game 1. He also led the National League in hit batsmen, with 10.

He led the National League in ERA (2.18) in 1988, despite winning only five games (losing nine). He holds the distinction of the fewest wins by an ERA leader, excluding strike seasons. He finished 4th in voting for the 1989 NL Cy Young with an 18–9 win–loss record, a 2.91 ERA and surrendered only 5 home runs in 234 2/3 innings.

An injured elbow in 1990 cost him almost all of the next two seasons and most of his effectiveness, and he never regained his early form. He won 11 games between the St. Louis and California ball clubs in 1993, but could not muster more than two wins or 74 innings pitched in any other season until his retirement in 1996 at the relatively early age of 32.

== Broadcasting career ==
Prior to joining the MLB Network, Magrane was teamed with play-by-play announcer Dewayne Staats from 1998 to 2008 as part of the Tampa Bay Rays television team, and also served as an analyst for NBC Sports' coverage of baseball at the 2008 Summer Olympics.

== Personal life ==
Magrane and his wife Renee, have two daughters, Shannon and Sophia. In 2012, Shannon was a finalist on the 11th season of American Idol.

== See also ==
- List of Major League Baseball annual ERA leaders

Preceded by First	Tampa Bay Rays television color announcer 1998–2008	Succeeded by Kevin Kennedy
