= Cari Q =

American singer-songwriter

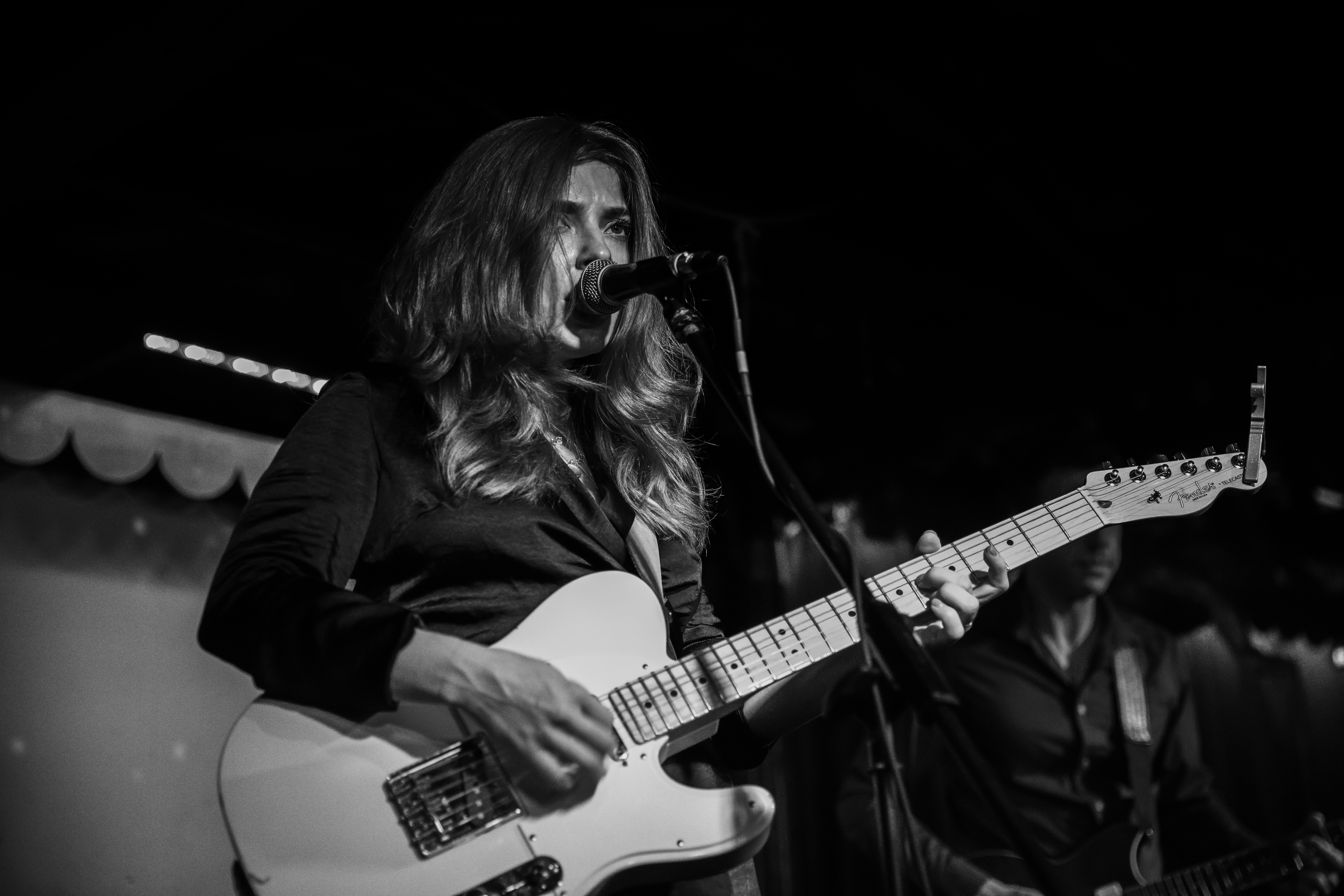
- Cari Q performing at SXSW in 2012

Background information
- Birth name: Cari Quoyeser
- Also known as: Cari Q
- Born: November 10, 1990 (age 34); Houston, Texas, U.S.
- Genres: Alternative rock, indie rock
- Occupation(s): Singer-songwriter, performer, musician
- Instrument(s): Vocals, guitar, piano
- Years active: 2009–present
- Website: cariqmusic.com

Cari Q (born Cari Quoyeser, November 10, 1990) is an American indie rock singer, songwriter, performer, and artist from Houston, Texas, based in Bologna, Italy. Performing with a band and as a solo artist, Cari appeared on NPR's Soundcheck with Ben Folds, was a singer with the Houston Texans cheerleaders, and sang at the 2011 NFL draft party. She played at the SXSW music festival and competed on American Idol (season 11) in January 2012.

== Early life and education ==
Cari Quoyeser was born and raised in Houston, Texas. She attended Stratford High School. Cari holds a bachelor's degree in history from the University of Texas at Austin, graduating in 2013. In 2022, Quoyeser earned a Master of Business Administration from Bologna Business School.

== Career ==
Cari began her music career as lead vocalist and rhythm guitarist for Houston-based band Suburban Warfare in early 2009. The Cari Quoyeser Band made their live performing debut at Fitzgerald's in Houston, Texas on June 25, 2010. Cari also started a solo project, Cari Q, recording her solo debut album Blueprints to Infinity in 2012 at SugarHill Recording Studios.

In 2009, Suburban Warfare appeared on NPR's Soundcheck with Ben Folds. As a solo act, Cari Q was a showcasing artist at the SXSW Music festival in March 2010. From 2011 to 2013, Cari performed as a singer with the Houston Texans cheerleaders, performing at the 2011 NFL draft party.

Cari competed on American Idol (season 11) in an episode broadcast in January 2012.

Starting in 2014, Cari Q embarked on a European tour, additionally performing multiple concerts in Israel, as well as at the 2014 Fete de la Musique in France. In 2017, she headlined at the Edinburgh Festival Fringe.

From 2012 through 2018, Cari lived and performed in Austin, Texas. She played the 2015 Heart of Texas Rockfest, a showcase for unsigned local artists during the annual SXSW music festival. In 2018, Cari relocated from Austin, Texas, to Belfast, Northern Ireland.

Upon graduating with her MBA in 2021, Cari joined Musixmatch as their global Artists Community Manager. In 2022, Cari Quoyeser founded the podcast The Mix, where she interviews musical acts and discusses important trends in music and technology. She currently resides in Bologna, Italy where she is taking a break from recording and playing live to work on songwriting.

== Discography ==
=== Albums ===
- Blueprints to Infinity (2012)
- Driftwork Sound Sessions (2019)

=== Singles ===
- Fall of Rome (2015)
- Byzantium (2019)
- When You're Around (2020)
- Kill Me Twice (2020)
- Negev (2020)
