= American Idols Live! Tour 2012 =

2012 summer concert tour

- Tour by American Idol
- Back – Colton Dixon, Hollie Cavanagh, Phillip Phillips; Middle – Elise Testone, Erika Van Pelt, Heejun Han, Skylar Laine; Front – Joshua Ledet, Jessica Sanchez, DeAndre Brackensick
- Start date: July 6, 2012
- End date: September 21, 2012
- No. of shows: 46
- Box office: 14 million from 46 shows

American Idol concert chronology
- American Idols Live! Tour 2011 (2011); American Idols Live! Tour 2012 (2012); American Idols Live! Tour 2013 (2013)

The American Idols Live! Tour 2012 was a summer and fall concert tour in the United States, Canada and Philippines that features the Top 10 contestants of the eleventh season of American Idol. The tour began on July 6, 2012, in Detroit, Michigan and ended on September 21, 2012, in Quezon City, Philippines. At most venues, the stage was placed in the middle while the other half was closed off with curtains, thus making a theater-like environment.

Like the 2011 summer tour, this is the second time to include the Philippines at the same venue in Quezon City, marking this the third time that the tour took place outside North America.

== Performers ==
Phillip Phillips (Winner)	Jessica Sanchez (Runner-up)
Joshua Ledet (3rd place)	Hollie Cavanagh (4th place)
Skylar Laine (5th place)	Elise Testone (6th place)
Colton Dixon (7th place)	DeAndre Brackensick (8th place)
Heejun Han (9th place)	Erika Van Pelt (10th place)

== Overview ==
The tour this repeated the same format as American Idols Live! Tour 2011, where there were solos and group performances. The first half contained solos from the first five contestants eliminated: Erika Van Pelt, Heejun Han, Deandre Brackensick, Colton Dixon and Elise Testone. The second half started with a set for the runner-up, Jessica Sanchez, then there were performances by Skylar Laine, Hollie Cavanagh and Joshua Ledet, and then a set for the winner, Phillip Phillips. The show ended with a group number.

Unlike previous tours, the stage was placed in the middle of an arena to make it look like a theater environment.

== Setlist ==
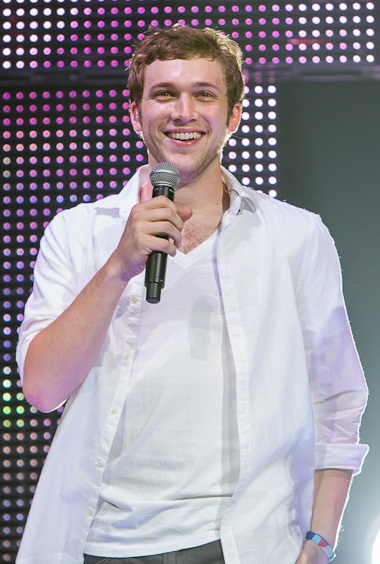
Phillip Phillips performing on the 2012 tour at Seattle Center's KeyArena

- Top 10 (except Phillips) – "Sing" (My Chemical Romance)
- DeAndre Brackensick – "Master Blaster (Jammin')" (Stevie Wonder)
- Hollie Cavanagh and Skylar Laine – "Undo It" (Carrie Underwood)
- Erika Van Pelt – "Glitter in the Air" (Pink)
- Van Pelt, Cavanagh, Joshua Ledet and Colton Dixon – "Moves like Jagger" (Maroon 5 feat. Christina Aguilera)
- Heejun Han – "Green Light" (John Legend)
- Han, Brackensick and Jessica Sanchez – "Party Rock Anthem" (LMFAO)
- Ledet, Dixon, Brackensick and Han – "Everybody Talks" (Neon Trees)
- Elise Testone – "Whole Lotta Love" (Led Zeppelin), "Rumour Has It" (with Brackensick and Van Pelt on backing vocals) (Adele)
- Dixon – "Meant to Live" (Switchfoot), "Never Gone" (Colton Dixon) and "Piano Man" (Billy Joel)
- Top 10 (except Phillips)– "Just the Way You Are"/"What Makes You Beautiful" (Bruno Mars/One Direction)

Intermission

- Sanchez – "Best Thing I Never Had" (Beyoncé), "How Come U Don't Call Me Anymore?" (with Ledet and Brackensick on backing vocals) (Prince) and "Proud Mary" (with Ledet and Brackensick on backing vocals) (Creedence Clearwater Revival)
- Laine – "Gunpowder & Lead" (Miranda Lambert) and "Stay with Me" (Faces)
- Cavanagh – "Rolling in the Deep" (with Testone and Van Pelt on backing vocals) (Adele) and "Give Your Heart a Break" (Demi Lovato)
- Ledet "Runaway Baby" (with Testone, Brakensick and Van Pelt on backing vocals) (Bruno Mars) and "It's a Man's Man's Man's World" (James Brown)
- Ledet and Sanchez – "I Knew You Were Waiting (For Me)" (George Michael and Aretha Franklin)
- Phillip Phillips – "Superstition" (Stevie Wonder) and "Nice & Slow" (Usher)
- Phillips and Testone – "Somebody That I Used to Know" (Gotye feat. Kimbra)
- Phillips (with Sanchez on backing vocal) – "Volcano" (Damien Rice)
- Phillips (with Dixon and Brackensick on backing vocals) – "Home" (Phillip Phillips)
- Sanchez, Cavanagh, Laine, Testone and Van Pelt – "Raise Your Glass" (Pink)
- All Top 10 – "Glad You Came" (The Wanted)

== Tour dates ==
Date	City	Country	Venue	Tickets sold / available	Gross revenue
North America
July 6, 2012	Detroit	United States	Joe Louis Arena	5,441 / 6,219 (87%)	$315,363
July 7, 2012	Rosemont	United States	Allstate Arena	7,374 / 8,340 (88%)	$409,683
July 9, 2012	Minneapolis	United States	Target Center	5,488 / 6,339 (87%)	$316,337
July 11, 2012	St. Louis	United States	Scottrade Center	4,481 / 6,364 (70%)	$255,721
July 12, 2012	Kansas City	United States	Sprint Center	4,699 / 6,517 (72%)	$276,169
July 14, 2012	Broomfield	United States	1stBank Center	4,007 / 4,920 (81%)	$238,368
July 16, 2012	West Valley City	United States	Maverik Center	2,888 / 5,241 (55%)	$165,187
July 18, 2012	Seattle	United States	KeyArena	5,970 / 6,353 (94%)	$344,729
July 19, 2012	Portland	United States	Theater of the Clouds	5,019 / 6,030 (83%)	$296,049
July 21, 2012	Sacramento	United States	Power Balance Pavilion	6,865 / 7,710 (89%)	$379,005
July 22, 2012	San Jose	United States	HP Pavilion at San Jose	8,105 / 8,593 (94%)	$451,391
July 23, 2012	Los Angeles	United States	Nokia Theatre L.A. Live	5,917 / 6,339 (93%)	$362,096
July 25, 2012	Ontario	United States	Citizens Business Bank Arena	5,755 / 6,688 (86%)	$368,054
July 26, 2012	San Diego	United States	Valley View Casino Center	5,422 / 6,579 (82%)	$320,449
July 27, 2012	Glendale	United States	Jobing.com Arena	4,362 / 5,518 (79%)	$256,030
July 29, 2012	Dallas	United States	American Airlines Center	8,775 / 9,498 (92%)	$475,103
July 30, 2012	Lafayette	United States	Cajundome	9,226 / 9,226 (100%)	$481,581
July 31, 2012	Jackson	United States	Mississippi Coliseum	7,152 / 7,152 (100%)	$358,984
August 2, 2012	Orlando	United States	Amway Center	6,129 / 6,789 (90%)	$352,338
August 3, 2012	Sunrise	United States	BankAtlantic Center	4,294 / 5,492 (63%)	$253,273
August 5, 2012	Duluth	United States	Arena at Gwinnett Center	8,053 / 8,053 (100%)	$434,274
August 6, 2012	North Charleston	United States	North Charleston Coliseum	6,114 / 6,902 (86%)	$336,998
August 8, 2012	Washington, D.C.	United States	Verizon Center	6,101 / 7,196 (85%)	$349,662
August 9, 2012	Baltimore	United States	1st Mariner Arena	4,200 / 5,579 (75%)	$245,412
August 11, 2012	Columbus	United States	Schottenstein Center	5,704 / 6,852 (83%)	$321,084
August 12, 2012	Nashville	United States	Bridgestone Arena	7,249 / 7,934 (91%)	$400,179
August 14, 2012	Pittsburgh	United States	Consol Energy Center	4,675 / 6,045 (77%)	$264,284
August 15, 2012	Rochester	United States	Blue Cross Arena	3,409 / 4,694 (73%)	$199,444
August 16, 2012	Toronto	Canada	Air Canada Centre	7,895 / 8,587 (92%)	$456,218
August 18, 2012	Manchester	United States	Verizon Wireless Arena	6,299 / 6,821 (92%)	$363,495
August 19, 2012	Worcester	United States	DCU Center	5,471 / 6,378 (86%)	$316,184
August 21, 2012	Philadelphia	United States	Wells Fargo Center	5,387 / 7,014 (77%)	$312,327
August 22, 2012	Uniondale	United States	Nassau Veterans Memorial Coliseum	7,777 / 8,211 (95%)	$421,551
August 25, 2012	Portland	United States	Cumberland County Civic Center	4,976 / 5,415 (92%)	$282,631
August 26, 2012	Providence	United States	Dunkin' Donuts Center	6,840 / 7,361 (93%)	$380,782
August 28, 2012	Newark	United States	Prudential Center	8,035 / 8,812 (91%)	$444,658
August 30, 2012	Albany	United States	Times Union Center	3,485 / 4,717 (74%)	$203,784
September 1, 2012	Bridgeport	United States	Webster Bank Arena	5,586 / 6,694 (83%)	$316,276
September 2, 2012	Uncasville	United States	Mohegan Sun Arena	3,920 / 4,897 (80%)	$292,820
September 4, 2012	Syracuse	United States	Oncenter War Memorial Arena	2,712 / 4,449 (61%)	$160,018
September 6, 2012	Wilkes-Barre	United States	Mohegan Sun Arena at Casey Plaza	3,565 / 6,547 (55%)	$204,320
September 7, 2012	Atlantic City	United States	Boardwalk Hall	6,117 / 7,590 (81%)	$350,948
September 8, 2012	Reading	United States	Sovereign Center	4,061 / 6,098 (67%)	$233,468
September 10, 2012	Cincinnati	United States	U.S. Bank Arena	3,527 / 5,627 (63%)	$201,124
September 11, 2012	Milwaukee	United States	BMO Harris Bradley Center	4,176 / 5,692 (73%)	$245,171
Asia
September 21, 2012	Quezon City	Philippines	Smart Araneta Coliseum		
TOTAL				252,703 / 300,072 (84%)	$14,413,023

== Revenue ==
The tour was ranked No. 62 in the list of 2012 Year-end Top 200 North American tours, based on total gross income .

== Tour summary ==
- Number of shows – 46 (3 sold out)
- Total gross – $14,413,023 (45 shows)
- Total attendance – 252,703 (84%)
- Average attendance – 5,616 (84.2%)
- Average ticket price – $57.04
- Highest gross – Lafayette, Louisiana – $481,581
- Lowest gross – Syracuse, New York – $160,018
- Highest attendance – Lafayette, Louisiana – 9,226 (100%)
- Lowest attendance – Syracuse, New York – 2,712 (61%)
