= Erika Van Pelt =

American singer

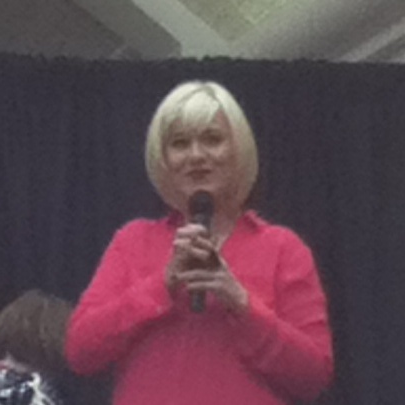
- Erika Van Pelt at the Warwick Mall in Warwick, Rhode Island for Cancer Awareness Day.

Background information
- Born: Erika Lynn Van Pelt; December 12, 1985 (age 40); Providence, Rhode Island, U.S.
- Origin: South Kingstown, Rhode Island
- Genre: Rock
- Occupations: Singer, wedding singer, disc jockey
- Instruments: Vocals, piano
- Years active: 2005–present
- Website: Official website

Erika Lynn Van Pelt (born December 12, 1985) is an American singer from South Kingstown, Rhode Island, who placed in tenth place on the eleventh season of American Idol.

== Early life ==
Van Pelt was born and raised in Providence, Rhode Island. In 2002, she moved to South Kingstown, Rhode Island. Van Pelt sang at church in the children's choir and at the age of seven was singing solos with the adult choir.

Van Pelt went to South Kingstown High School and joined the vocal jazz music ensemble and chorus and was involved in musical theatre. She was in groups that received first places at the Rhode Island All State Jazz Choir, Rhode Island All-State Chorus, All New England Chorus and All-Eastern Chorus competitions. She was a founding member of a cappella group called SoundCheck.

Van Pelt attended Community College of Rhode Island and Berklee College of Music in Boston, Massachusetts and studied jazz, rock, pop and soul along with production and engineering. After college, in 2005, she launched her own company, VP Entertainment, a full-service mobile DJ company, and became an independent contractor with Kaleidoscope Kabaret, performing throughout New England at major venues including Foxwoods Resort Casino and Mohegan Sun. She performs part-time with The Sultans of Swing, and is a performing partner of Fairhaven Entertainment and Boston Swing.

Her major live performances include the national production "If You're Irish" and the annual "Chance to Dance" shows at the Providence Performing Arts Center, as well Boston Swing with Mark Maher at the Hard Rock Cafe in Boston, Massachusetts. In February and March 2010, she starred alongside Matthew Royalty-Lindman in The Contemporary Theater Company's production of The Last 5 Years. She has been a member of the company since 2010, also caroling with the company's holiday singers each year since 2009.

== Influences ==
Van Pelt draws her influences anywhere from Aerosmith, Aretha Franklin, Nina Simone, Chaka Khan, Pink, Joss Stone, Jessie J, Brandi Carlile, Björk, Jill Scott, and Kim Burrell. She has a passion for rhythm and blues, soul, country, jazz, rock and classical.

== American Idol ==
Van Pelt auditioned for the eleventh season of American Idol in Pittsburgh, Pennsylvania. In the semi-final round, she performed Heart's "What About Love", but was not one of the five highest female vote getters. The judges selected her to be one of the six wild card performers. She performed Lady Gaga's "The Edge of Glory" and was selected as one of the three wild cards to advance to the Top 13. Van Pelt was eliminated on March 22, 2012, after cutting her usually shoulder length locks to a pixie cut, courtesy of Tommy Hilfiger. Over all, she finished in tenth place.

=== Performances/results ===
Episode	Theme	Song choice	Original artist	Order #	Result
Audition	Auditioner's Choice	"Will You Love Me Tomorrow"	The Shirelles	N/A	Advanced
Hollywood Round, Part 1	First Solo	"Glitter in the Air"	Pink	N/A	Advanced
Hollywood Round, Part 2	Group Performance	Not aired		N/A	Advanced
Hollywood Round, Part 3	Second Solo	Not aired		N/A	Advanced
Las Vegas Round	Songs from the 1950s Group Performance	"Great Balls of Fire" / "Shake a Tail Feather"	Jerry Lee Lewis / The Five Du-Tones	N/A	Advanced
Final Judgement	Final Solo	"Don't You Remember"	Adele	N/A	Advanced
Top 25 (12 Women)	Personal Choice	"What About Love"	Toronto	2	Wild Card
Wild Card	Personal Choice	"The Edge of Glory"	Lady Gaga	5	Advanced
Top 13	Whitney Houston	"I Believe in You and Me"	Four Tops	4	Bottom 3 Women^{1}
Top 11	Year They Were Born	"Heaven"	Bryan Adams	8	Bottom 3^{2}
Top 10	Billy Joel	"New York State of Mind"	Billy Joel	2	Eliminated

- ^Note 1 When Ryan Seacrest announced the results for this particular night, Van Pelt was among the Bottom 3 Women, but declared safe first.
- ^Note 2 ^Note 2 When Ryan Seacrest announced the results for this particular night, Van Pelt was among the Bottom 3 but declared safe second, as Shannon Magrane was eliminated.

== Post-Idol ==
Van Pelt appeared on The Today show and Anderson on March 27, 2012, and performed on The Tonight Show with Jay Leno on March 30, 2012. She took part in the American Idols LIVE! Tour 2012, which began July 6, 2012 and ran till September 21, 2012. She teamed up with American Idol season three top 10 finalist John Stevens to perform with the Beantown Swing Orchestra in a holiday concert in Providence, R.I. on December 9, 2012. Her debut single, "Listen, Learn, Then Delete" was released on July 31, 2013. Erika's debut album, "My Independence" was released on October 8, 2013. The executive producer for the album was Rich Sokolow and songwriters were Erika Van Pelt, Rich Sokolow, Peter Wostrel and Clara Lofaro. The album was nominated for two New England Music Awards for "Album of the Year" and "Best Indie/Pop Act of the Year". Erika performed a number of major shows in 2013, including opening for the multi-Grammy nominated Daughtry for the WXLO acoustic Holiday Concert at Mechanics Hall in Worcester, Massachusetts, opening for Tegan and Sara at WPRO FM's "What Women Want Expo" in Cranston, Rhode Island, and performing at the Magic 106.7 Tree Lighting Ceremony with Joey McIntyre of New Kids on the Block Fame on the Boston Common.

== Discography ==
- My Independence (2013)
