= Shannon Magrane =

American singer (born 1995)

- Born: Shannon Renee' Magrane; October 21, 1995 (age 30); Tampa, Florida, U.S.
- Genres: Pop
- Occupation: Singer
- Instrument: Vocals
- Years active: 2011–present
- Website: www.shannonmagrane.com

Shannon Renee' Magrane (born October 21, 1995) is an American singer from Tampa, Florida, who finished in eleventh place on the eleventh season of American Idol.

== Early life and education ==
Her father is former St. Louis Cardinals pitcher and former Tampa Bay Rays broadcaster Joe Magrane. Magrane graduated from Howard W. Blake High School.

== American Idol ==
Magrane auditioned in Savannah, Georgia. In the semi-finals she performed "Go Light Your World" by Kathy Troccoli. She was one of the top five female vote getters and advanced to the top 13. In the top 13 she performed "I Have Nothing" by Whitney Houston and was one of the bottom three female voter getters, but was declared safe. In the top 11, she performed "One Sweet Day" by Mariah Carey and Boyz II Men and was eliminated.

=== Performances/results ===
Episode	Theme	Song choice	Original artist	Order #	Result
Audition	Auditioner's Choice	"Something's Got a Hold on Me"	Etta James	N/A	Advanced
Hollywood Round, Part 1	First Solo	"Fallin'"	Alicia Keys	N/A	Advanced
Hollywood Round, Part 2	Group Performance	"Hit 'Em Up Style (Oops!)"	Blu Cantrell	N/A	Advanced
Hollywood Round, Part 3	Second Solo	"What a Wonderful World"	Louis Armstrong	N/A	Advanced
Las Vegas Round	Songs from the 1950s Group Performance	"At the Hop" / "Blue Suede Shoes" with Joshua Ledet, Curtis Finch, Jr., and Amber Holcomb	Danny & the Juniors / Carl Perkins	N/A	Advanced
Final Judgement	Final Solo	"The Trouble with Love Is"	Kelly Clarkson	N/A	Advanced
Top 25 (12 Women)	Personal Choice	"Go Light Your World"	Kathy Troccoli	10	Advanced
Top 13	Whitney Houston	"I Have Nothing"	Whitney Houston	6	Bottom 3 Women^{1}
Top 11	Year They Were Born	"One Sweet Day"	Mariah Carey & Boyz II Men	6	Eliminated

- ^Note 1 When Ryan Seacrest announced the results for this particular night, Magrane was among the Bottom 3 Women but declared safe second, as Elise Testone was declared as the bottom female vote getter.

== Post-Idol ==
Magrane appeared on The Today Show and Anderson on March 20, 2012. On April 13, 2012, Magrane performed "The Star-Spangled Banner" at Busch Stadium prior to the season home opener of the St. Louis Cardinals. She also performed at the official welcome party of the 2012 Republican National Convention. Since then, Magrane has released her first single Weather and is currently working on new music.

== Voice ==
Magrane possesses the vocal range of a mezzo-soprano.
