= Jermaine Jones (singer) =

American singer

- Born: November 3, 1986 (age 39); Pine Hill, New Jersey, U.S.
- Genre: R&B
- Occupations: Singer, actor, vocal instructor
- Instrument: Vocals
- Years active: 2012–present
- Label: Shavoni Entertainment

Jermaine Jones (born November 3, 1986) is an American singer and actor from Pine Hill, New Jersey, who came in twelfth place after being disqualified from the eleventh season of American Idol.

== Early life ==
Jones was born to Katrice Cornett and lives in Pine Hill, New Jersey. He attended Overbrook High School. He works as a vocal instructor. According to the official American Idol website, his musical influences are his mother and John Legend.

== American Idol ==
In Las Vegas, he performed "Make it Easy on Yourself" with Richie Law and the judges advanced both to the next round.

Jones was not originally chosen for the top 24 semi-finalist round, but he was called back after the top 24 selection filming, making him the 25th semi-finalist and thirteenth male semi-finalist. He is 6 feet 8 and a half inches tall and has been dubbed on the show as "The Gentle Giant" due to his height. In the semi-finals, he sang Luther Vandross's "Dance with My Father". He was one of the top five male vote getters and advanced to the top 13.

On March 13, 2012, it was announced that Jones would be disqualified from the competition after failing to disclose that he had been previously arrested on two separate occasions, one of them being a violent crime. He is the second and the final Idol contestant to be disqualified from the finals, after the same thing happened to Corey Clark in the second season. A clip of his rehearsal of "Somewhere Out There", was shown after his removal from the show and would have been his performance that night and a studio version was released on iTunes. As a result of his disqualification, Jones was not allowed to have any further involvement with the show and could not participate in the live finale with the other finalists.

=== Performances/results ===
Episode	Theme	Song choice	Original artist	Order #	Result
Audition	Auditioner's Choice	"Superstar"	Delaney & Bonnie	N/A	Advanced
Hollywood Round, Part 1	First Solo	"Superstar"	Delaney & Bonnie	N/A	Advanced
Hollywood Round, Part 2	Group Performance	Not aired		N/A	Advanced
Hollywood Round, Part 3	Second Solo	Not aired		N/A	Advanced
Las Vegas Round	Songs from the 1950s Group Performance	"Make It Easy on Yourself"	Jerry Butler	N/A	Advanced
Final Judgement	Final Solo	"I Believe in You and Me"	Four Tops	N/A	Eliminated^{1}
Top 25 (13 Men)	Personal Choice	"Dance with My Father"	Luther Vandross	13	Advanced
Top 13	Stevie Wonder	"Knocks Me Off My Feet"	Stevie Wonder	3	Bottom 3 Men^{2}
Top 12	Year They Were Born	Did not perform and was disqualified due to failing to disclose his criminal record.			

- ^Note 1 Jones was eliminated at the final judgement, but was reinstalled to make a Top 13 men.
- ^Note 2 When Ryan Seacrest announced the results for this particular night, Jones was among the Bottom 3 Men but declared safe second, as Jeremy Rosado was declared as the bottom male vote getter.

== Controversy ==
On March 14, 2012, Jones was disqualified from American Idol for concealing arrests and outstanding warrants. He denied that he had concealed his previous arrests, and had admitted that he had been arrested before. Critics accused the show of staging the disqualification to boost ratings. When asked about speculations that producers had prior knowledge of his criminal past and that the producers were simply out to exploit him on-air, Jones replied that "I haven't even taken my mind into that and why they did what they did, because then I'll drive myself crazy". A police official in a New Jersey town claimed he was the target of two arrest warrants said that the case wasn't big enough to merit going after him, and that for the show "to expose, embarrass and interrogate a young man without an attorney in front of 40 million viewers was an outrage".

On July 31, 2012, Jones pleaded guilty to the charges.

== Post Idol ==
Jones released the single "All Around the World" on July 19, 2012 on iTunes. He is also working on an independent movie titled The North Star, about an escaped slave who joins the Quaker abolitionist movement, which will star Jeremiah Trotter. He also said on his Twitter account that he would be auditioning for The Voice.

== Discography ==
=== Singles ===
Year	Title	Peak chart positions	Album
Year	Title	US	Album
2012	"All Around the World" (Feat. Fre-Stal)	—	TBA
