= Hollie Cavanagh =

British singer

- Born: Hollie Jessica Cavanagh; 5 July 1993 (age 33); Liverpool, England
- Origin: McKinney, Texas, U.S.
- Genre: Pop
- Occupation: Singer
- Instrument: Vocals
- Years active: 2010–present

Hollie Jessica Cavanagh (born 5 July 1993) is an English singer. She placed fourth on the eleventh season of American Idol.

== Early life ==
Hollie Jessica Cavanagh was born in Liverpool on 5 July 1993, the daughter of Lorraine and Peter Cavanagh. She has two older brothers named Luke and Aaron. She grew up in the Allerton suburb of Liverpool, and moved with her family in 2002 to McKinney, Texas. She started singing when she was 15 and had been singing for a few years before she joined American Idol. She attended St Austin's Primary School in the Aigburth suburb of Liverpool and later graduated from McKinney Boyd High School, in 2011.

== American Idol ==
=== Overview ===
Cavanagh originally auditioned for season 10 in Austin, Texas, but was cut in the Green Mile Round. However, Jennifer Lopez told Hollie that she could win the competition next season by practicing and improving her singing. Next year, Cavanagh got a second chance for season 11 and auditioned in Houston, Texas, but was not given a lot of screen time compared to the previous season. She was only shown in the Las Vegas Round performing a medley of "Mr. Sandman" by The Chordettes and "Please Mr. Postman" by The Marvelettes with Naomi Gillies and Marissa Pontecorvo and in the Green Mile Round with fellow American Idol contestants, Shelby Tweten and Ariel Sprague. She sang "Change" by Carrie Underwood in the Sing for Your Life Round and was given nice feedback by the judges. She advanced to the next round.

In the semi-finals, she sang "Reflection" by Christina Aguilera. Her performance received praise from the judges, with Lopez saying that Hollie could win the show, while Steven Tyler wanted her to let her hair down, but called her performance beautiful. Amy Sciaretto from PopCrush wrote that "She's a frontrunner, and she attempted to slay a pretty big dragon, since Xtina is so difficult to emulate due to her range. While there were some slightly off parts, Cavanagh still handled it like a diva-in-training." Cavanagh was advanced to the following week by voters, and during the Top 13 performance show, she sang Whitney Houston's version of "All the Man That I Need". Randy Jackson and Tyler told her that she nailed Houston's song, while Lopez lauded her saying, "That's the Hollie that I know. You're the one. We might have a sing off between two girls in the finale, and that's what I want!" For the Top 11 performance show, Cavanagh once again earned praise singing Celine Dion's "The Power of Love". In her mentoring session with will.i.am and Jimmy Iovine, will.i.am and Iovine were both extremely impressed with Cavanagh's range, saying "Where's all that power coming from? [...] You got amplifiers in your pockets?" Tyler commented "I don't know where your voice comes from. It's heaven above", while Jackson and Lopez, while praising the performance, pointed out minor pitch issues, though Jackson said that she blew the song out of the box. Brian Mansfield from USA Today commented that "She knows she hasn't made a safe choice, but she says now's not the time to play safe. Lots of big ballads tonight, but I think Hollie's may be the best."

Having been voted through to the next round once again, Cavanagh sang Billy Joel's "Honesty" at the Top 10 performance show. The judges' reactions to the performance were mixed, saying that she was over-thinking it. Prior to the performance, Iovine and the show's stylist Tommy Hilfiger had changed the way Cavanagh dressed, pointing out fashion as her only weakness. At the Top 9 performance show, she sang "Jesus, Take the Wheel" by Carrie Underwood. Jackson said that she had problems with her lower range register, while Lopez said it was one of her best performances in terms of connecting with the song. Tyler stated that the song choice was wrong. For the first time, Cavanagh fell to the bottom 3, but was sent to safety when Heejun Han was eliminated. Cavanagh was once again in the bottom 3 after her performance of "Flashdance... What a Feeling" at the Top 8 performance show. Tyler said that her pitch was all over the place, but she arrived at the end. Like previous performances, all judges agreed that she was over-thinking it. She was again sent to the bottom 3, but was declared safe first as DeAndre Brackensick was eliminated.

At the Top 7 performance show, Cavanagh sang "Perfect" by Pink receiving mixed feedback from the judges. The judges all agreed that it wasn't quite perfect. However, many people disagreed with the judges and thought their comments were unfair. On results night, she was declared safe as Jessica Sanchez was eliminated, but then saved by the judges.

At the second Top 7 performance night (as the judges had saved Jessica the previous week, resulting in a repeat of the Top 7) Cavanagh sang Adele's "Rolling in the Deep". The performance, which began in a cappella, received praise from the judges, who highlighted improvement compared to previous weeks, but didn't say it was perfect. For her second performance, she sang "Son of a Preacher Man" by Dusty Springfield which earned even more positive feedback from the judges than her first. While ending up in the bottom 3 again, she was safe while Colton Dixon was eliminated. On the top 6 performance show, Cavanagh sang Queen's "Save Me" and received mixed feedback from the judges. Her rendition of Miley Cyrus' "The Climb" (which was her initial audition song in season 10) earned her a standing ovation from the judges. She ended up in the bottom 3 again, but was safe as Elise Testone was eliminated. On the Top 5 performance show, Cavanagh sang Ike & Tina Turner's "River Deep – Mountain High" and earned a standing ovation from two thirds of the judges. TVLine.com's Michael Slezak also thought positively of the performance saying, "[...] "River Deep, Mountain High" was a study in sublime power vocals, without any unnecessary embellishments. [...] Hollie held back on the melisma and the vibrato and the riffing, delivering a classic melody with heart and soul, [...] The "I love you, baby" breakdown was one of my favorite musical moments of the season, and you can't really argue with a little flirty interplay with the bongo drummer, either." Later that night, Cavanagh performed "Bleeding Love" by Leona Lewis which garnered her more positive feedback. Lopez commented on how it was beautiful and intimate, while Jackson said she was peaking at the right time. On the results show, she ended up in the bottom 2 with Skylar Laine, but was safe as Skylar was eliminated.

On the Top 4 performance show, Cavanagh performed "Faithfully" by Journey. The performance earned her positive reviews from the judges repeating that she was peaking at the right time. For her second performance, Cavanagh performed Bonnie Raitt's "I Can't Make You Love Me". The judges gave her negative reviews stating that she did not connect with the song. On results night, she was eliminated and her final song was "The Climb" by Miley Cyrus.

On the eleventh-season finale, Cavanagh performed "You'll Never Walk Alone" from the musical Carousel with Jordin Sparks.

=== Performances/results ===
==== Season 10 ====
Episode	Theme	Song choice	Original artist	Order #	Result
Audition	Auditioner's Choice	"At Last"	Ray Eberle & Pat Friday	N/A	Advanced
Audition	Auditioner's Choice	"The Climb"	Miley Cyrus	N/A	Advanced
Hollywood Round, Part 1	First Solo	"When I Look at You"	Miley Cyrus	N/A	Advanced
Hollywood Round, Part 2	Group Performance	"Grenade"	Bruno Mars	N/A	Advanced
Hollywood Round, Part 3	Second Solo	Not aired		N/A	Advanced
Las Vegas Round	The Beatles; Group Performance	"Yesterday"	The Beatles	N/A	Advanced
Final Judgement	Final Solo	"No One"	Alicia Keys	N/A	Eliminated

==== Season 11 ====
Episode	Theme	Song choice	Original artist	Order #	Result
Audition	Auditioner's Choice	Not aired		N/A	Advanced
Hollywood Round, Part 1	First Solo	Not aired		N/A	Advanced
Hollywood Round, Part 2	Group Performance	Not aired		N/A	Advanced
Hollywood Round, Part 3	Second Solo	Not aired		N/A	Advanced
Las Vegas Round	Songs from the 1950s Group Performance	"Mr. Sandman" / "Please Mr. Postman"	The Chordettes / The Marvelettes	N/A	Advanced
Final Judgment	Final Solo	"Change"	Carrie Underwood	N/A	Advanced
Top 25 (12 Women)	Personal Choice	"Reflection"	Christina Aguilera	8	Advanced
Top 13	Whitney Houston	"All the Man That I Need"	Linda Clifford	10	Safe
Top 11	Year They Were Born	"The Power of Love"	Jennifer Rush	11	Safe
Top 10	Billy Joel	"Honesty"	Billy Joel	7	Safe
Top 9	Their Personal Idols	Solo "Jesus, Take the Wheel"	Carrie Underwood	5	Bottom 3^{1}
Top 9	Their Personal Idols	Trio "Like a Prayer" / "Borderline" / "Express Yourself" with Skylar Laine & Jessica Sanchez	Madonna	11	Bottom 3^{1}
Top 8	Songs from the 1980s	Duet "I'm So Excited" with DeAndre Brackensick	The Pointer Sisters	5	Bottom 3^{2}
Top 8	Songs from the 1980s	Solo "Flashdance... What a Feeling"	Irene Cara	9	Bottom 3^{2}
Top 7	Songs from the 2010s	Solo "Perfect"	Pink	7	Safe
Top 7	Songs from the 2010s	Trio "Stronger (What Doesn't Kill You)" with Joshua Ledet & Jessica Sanchez	Kelly Clarkson	9	Safe
Top 7^{3}	Songs from Now & Then	"Rolling in the Deep"	Adele	1	Bottom 3^{4}
Top 7^{3}	Songs from Now & Then	"Son of a Preacher Man"	Dusty Springfield	8	Bottom 3^{4}
Top 6	Queen	"Save Me"	Queen	6	Bottom 3^{5}
Top 6	Contestant's Choice	"The Climb"	Miley Cyrus	12	Bottom 3^{5}
Top 5	Songs from the 1960s	Solo "River Deep – Mountain High"	Ike & Tina Turner	1	Bottom 2^{6}
Top 5	Songs from the 1960s	Trio "(Your Love Keeps Lifting Me) Higher and Higher" with Skylar Laine & Jessica Sanchez	Jackie Wilson	9	Bottom 2^{6}
Top 5	British Pop	"Bleeding Love"	Leona Lewis	7	Bottom 2^{6}
Top 4	California Dreamin'	Solo "Faithfully"	Journey	2	Eliminated
Top 4	California Dreamin'	Duet "Eternal Flame" with Jessica Sanchez	The Bangles	6	Eliminated
Top 4	California Dreamin'	Quartet "Waiting for a Girl Like You" with Joshua Ledet, Phillip Phillips & Jessica Sanchez	Foreigner	7	Eliminated
Top 4	Songs They Wish They'd Written	"I Can't Make You Love Me"	Bonnie Raitt	9	Eliminated

- ^Note 1 When Ryan Seacrest announced the results for this particular night, Cavanagh was among the Bottom 3, but declared safe second, as Heejun Han was eliminated.
- ^Note 2 When Ryan Seacrest announced the results for this particular night, Cavanagh was among the Bottom 3, but declared safe first.
- ^Note 3 Due to the judges using their one save on Jessica Sanchez, the Top 7 remained intact for another week.
- ^Note 4 When Ryan Seacrest announced the results for this particular night, Cavanagh was among the Bottom 3, but declared safe second, as Colton Dixon was eliminated.
- ^Note 5 When Ryan Seacrest announced the results for this particular night, Cavanagh was among the bottom 3, but declared safe second, as Elise Testone was eliminated.
- ^Note 6 When Ryan Seacrest announced the results for this particular night, Cavanagh was in the bottom 2, but declared safe, as Skylar Laine was eliminated.

== Post-Idol ==
Cavanagh took part in the American Idols LIVE! Tour 2012, which began 6 July 2012 and ran until 21 September 2012. Cavanagh performed two solo songs, "Rolling in the Deep" by Adele and "Give Your Heart a Break" by Demi Lovato.

Her debut single, "Outer Limit", was released on 15 July 2013. Cavanagh released her second single, "Girlfriend", on 25 November 2013.

== Artistry ==
Cavanagh's musical influences include Adele, Christina Aguilera, Mariah Carey, Celine Dion, and Whitney Houston.

== Personal life ==
Cavanagh is a fan of her hometown football team Liverpool FC, and named her dog Shankly after Liverpool manager Bill Shankly.

== Discography ==
=== Extended plays ===
Title	Details	Peak chart positions	Sales
Title	Details	US	Sales
American Idol Season 11 Highlights (Hollie Cavanagh EP)	Released: 3 July 2012; Label: 19 Recordings; Formats: CD	176	US: 13,000

=== Singles ===
Year	Single	Album
2013	"Outer Limit"	Single
2013	"Girlfriend"	Single
