= American Idol season 11 =

American Idol
- Season 11
- Hosted by: Ryan Seacrest
- Judges: Randy Jackson; Jennifer Lopez; Steven Tyler
- Winner: Phillip Phillips
- Runner-up: Jessica Sanchez
- Finals venue: Nokia Theatre L.A. Live

Release
- Original network: Fox
- Original release: January 18 – May 23, 2012

Season chronology
- ← Previous; Season 10 Next → Season 12

The eleventh season of American Idol premiered on Fox on January 18, 2012, and concluded on May 23, 2012. Ryan Seacrest returned as host, while Randy Jackson, Jennifer Lopez, and Steven Tyler all returned as judges. Interscope Records chairman Jimmy Iovine, a songwriter and producer, also returned as an in-house mentor to work with the contestants on a weekly basis. The season followed the same format as the tenth season. Jennifer Lopez and Steven Tyler both announced that they would be leaving the show two months after the finale, although Lopez later returned as a judge for the show's thirteenth season.

The season set a record when 132 million votes were received for the finale. On May 23, 2012, Phillip Phillips became the winner of the eleventh season of American Idol, beating Jessica Sanchez, who was the runner-up.

== Changes from previous seasons ==
This season, long-time vocal coach Debra Byrd was replaced by Jimmy Iovine's own team. Additionally, fashion designers Tommy Hilfiger and Soyon An worked as image advisers for the top 13 finalists.

== Regional auditions ==
Auditions took place in the following cities:

American Idol (season 10) – regional auditions
City	Preliminary date	Preliminary venue	Filming date(s)	Filming venue	Golden tickets
St. Louis, Missouri	June 28, 2011	Scottrade Center	September 2–3, 2011	Hilton St. Louis at the Ballpark	46
Portland, Oregon	July 2, 2011	Rose Garden	October 1–2, 2011	Red Lion Hotel	45
San Diego, California	July 8, 2011	Petco Park	October 9–10, 2011	USS Midway	53
Pittsburgh, Pennsylvania	July 15, 2011	Heinz Field	September 28–29, 2011	David L. Lawrence Convention Center	38
North Charleston, South Carolina	July 22, 2011	North Charleston Coliseum	August 17–18, 2011	Hyatt Regency, Savannah, Georgia	42
Denver, Colorado	July 29, 2011	Invesco Field	October 5–6, 2011	Doerr-Hosier Center, Aspen, Colorado	31
Houston, Texas	August 26, 2011	Reliant Arena	August 30–31, 2011	Galveston Island Convention Center	55
East Rutherford, New Jersey	September 22, 2011	Izod Center	September 24–25, 2011	Unknown (Note: The audition episode in East Rutherford was not aired.)	Unknown
Total number of tickets to Hollywood					310

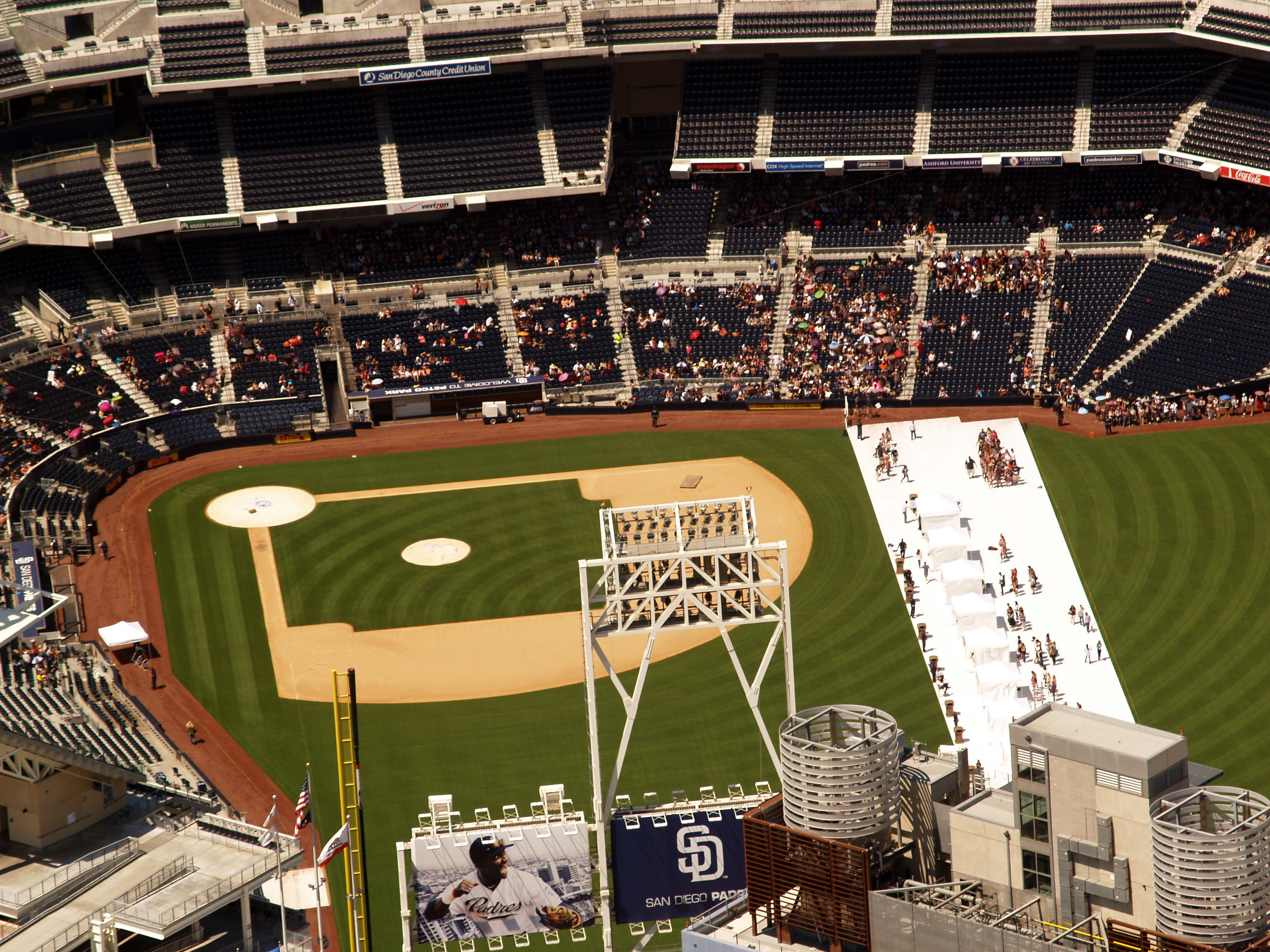
A helicopter view of American Idol auditions at Petco Park in San Diego, July 8, 2011

The audition in East Rutherford, New Jersey, was a late addition to the schedule. The audition was held, although the attendance was reportedly low. However, the audition episode was not shown. Contestants known to have auditioned in East Rutherford were listed as having auditioned elsewhere on the official American Idol website. For example, Alex Wong, who auditioned in East Rutherford, had San Diego listed as his audition city on the official website.

== Hollywood week ==
The Hollywood rounds were held at the Pasadena Civic Auditorium beginning on December 12, 2011. The 309 contestants performed solo for the first round, and 185 made the cut. Amongst those sent home included Jim Carrey's daughter, Jane Carrey. The second round involved group performances, and a number of contestants became ill and collapsed in the auditorium. 98 contestants moved on to the third and final round: solo performances accompanied by a band or an instrument. The contestants were then separated into four rooms, where one room of 28 contestants were all eliminated, while the 70 contestants in the other three rooms advanced to the Las Vegas round.

In Las Vegas, the contestants performed traditional 1950s songs in groups with Elvis Presley's "Viva, Elvis!" show as the backdrop. 28 of the 70 contestants were eliminated. Next came a solo round accompanied by an instrument at the stage for Le Rêve at the Wynn Las Vegas. After the 42 remaining contestants sang their last solo, they were summoned one-by-one to appear before the judges. Twelve men and twelve women were initially announced as the semifinalists; however, the judges announced that one of four men eliminated (Jermaine Jones, Johnny Keyser, Richie Law, or David Leathers, Jr.) would be reinstated into the competition as a surprise thirteenth male, rendering it a Top 25 this season. Ultimately, Jones was selected, and revealed at the end of the males' semifinals show for his performance.

== Semifinals ==
The semifinals began on February 28. The males and females competed on back-to-back nights, and the top five from each group, along with the judges' three Wild Card choices, advanced to the finals.

Color key:

This contestant was chosen by the public and moved on to the live shows.
This contestant was not chosen by the public and was left to perform again for the judges in the Wild Card round.
This contestant was eliminated.

=== Top 25 ===
Contestants are listed in the order they performed.

Top 25 - Male contestants (February 28)
Contestant	Song	Result
Reed Grimm	"Moves like Jagger"	Wild Card
Adam Brock	"Think"	Eliminated
DeAndre Brackensick	"Reasons"	Wild Card
Colton Dixon	"Decode"	Advanced
Jeremy Rosado	"Gravity"	Wild Card
Aaron Marcellus	"Never Can Say Goodbye"	Eliminated
Chase Likens	"Storm Warning"	Eliminated
Creighton Fraker	"True Colors"	Eliminated
Phillip Phillips	"In the Air Tonight"	Advanced
Eben Franckewitz	"Set Fire to the Rain"	Eliminated
Heejun Han	"Angels"	Advanced
Joshua Ledet	"You Pulled Me Through"	Advanced
Jermaine Jones	"Dance with My Father"	Advanced

Top 25 - Female contestants (February 29)
Contestant	Song	Result
Chelsea Sorrell	"Cowboy Casanova"	Eliminated
Erika Van Pelt	"What About Love"	Wild Card
Jen Hirsh	"One and Only"	Wild Card
Brielle Von Hugel	"(Sittin' On) The Dock of the Bay"	Wild Card
Hallie Day	"Feeling Good"	Eliminated
Skylar Laine	"Stay with Me"	Advanced
Baylie Brown	"Amazed"	Eliminated
Hollie Cavanagh	"Reflection"	Advanced
Haley Johnsen	"Sweet Dreams (Are Made of This)"	Eliminated
Shannon Magrane	"Go Light Your World"	Advanced
Jessica Sanchez	"Love You I Do"	Advanced
Elise Testone	"One and Only"	Advanced

=== Wild Card round ===
After ten singers advanced on Thursday, March 1, six of the remaining semifinalists were selected by the judges to compete in the Wild Card round. The judges selected three contestants to advance to the final group of 13. Contestants are listed in the order they performed.

Contestant	Song	Result
Jen Hirsh	"Oh! Darling"	Eliminated
Jeremy Rosado	"I Know You Won't"	Advanced
Brielle Von Hugel	"Someone like You"	Eliminated
DeAndre Brackensick	"Georgia on My Mind"	Advanced
Erika Van Pelt	"The Edge of Glory"	Advanced
Reed Grimm	"Use Me"	Eliminated

== Top 13 contestants ==
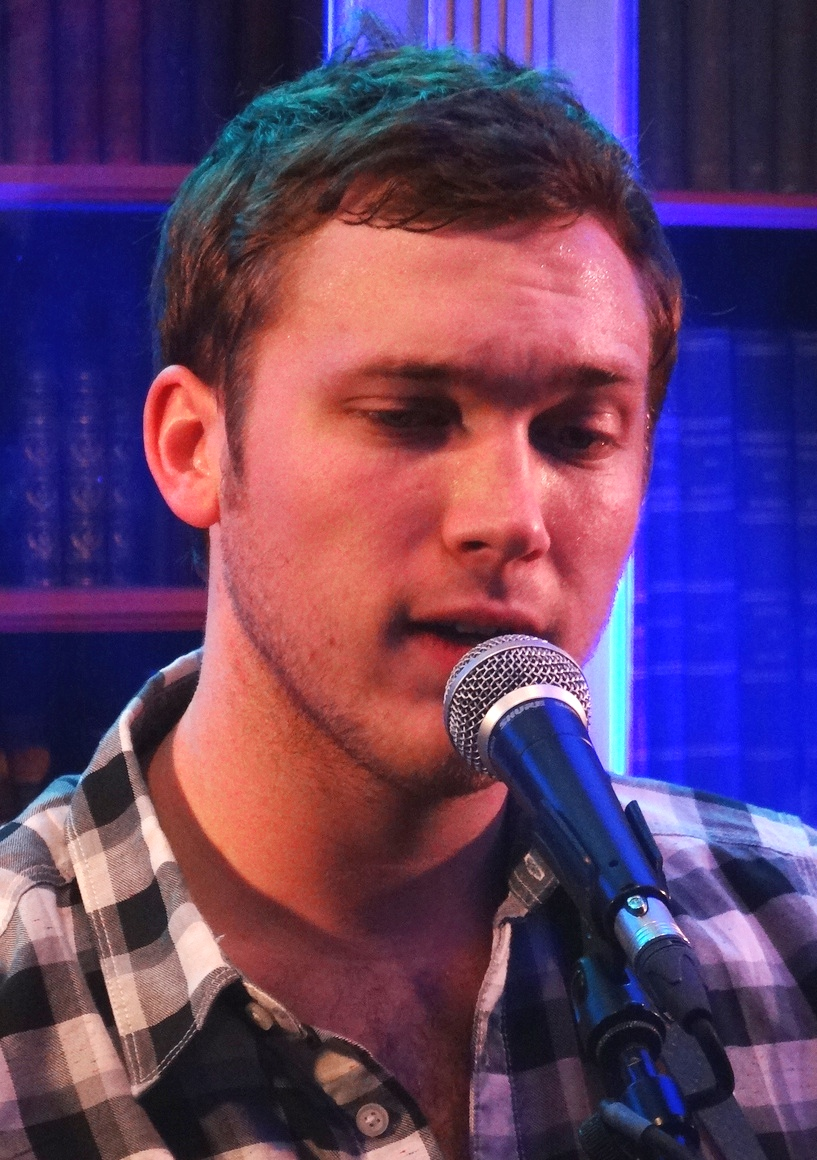
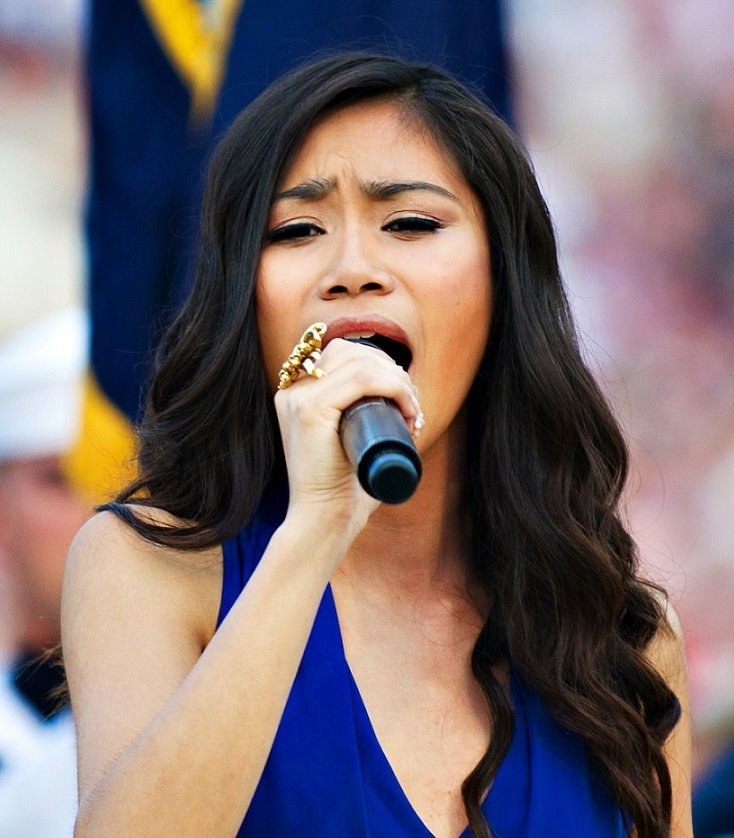
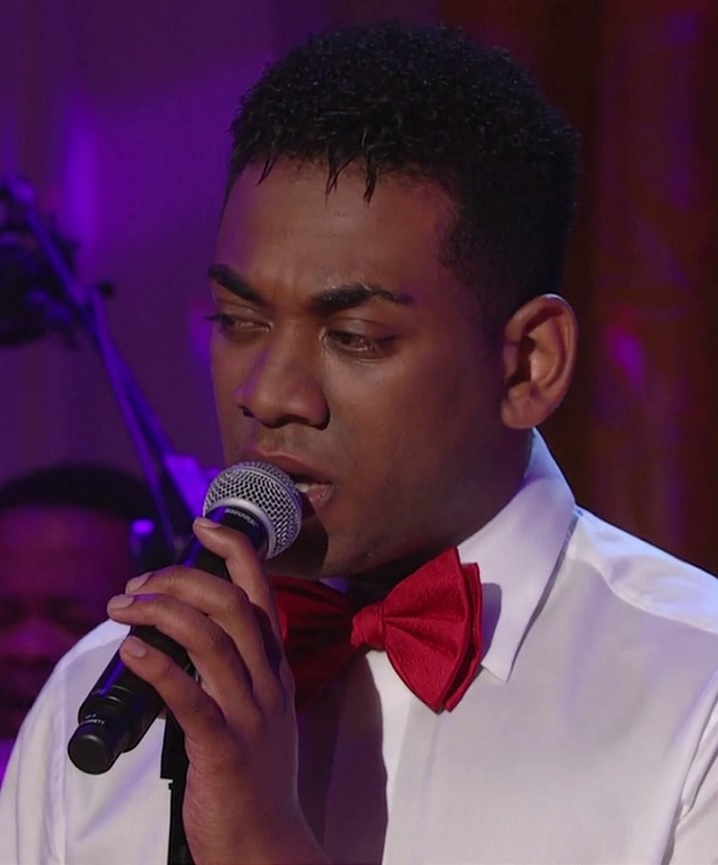
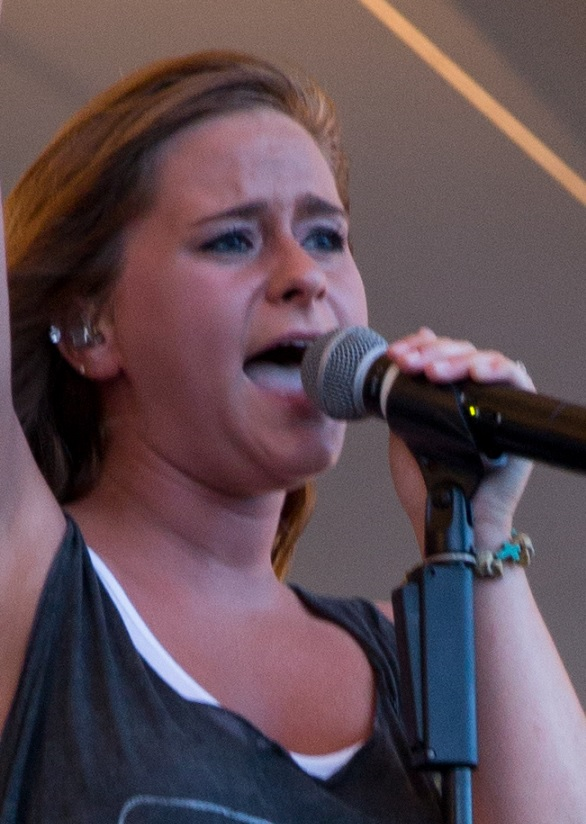
From left to right: Phillip Phillips, Jessica Sanchez, Joshua Ledet, and Skylar Laine
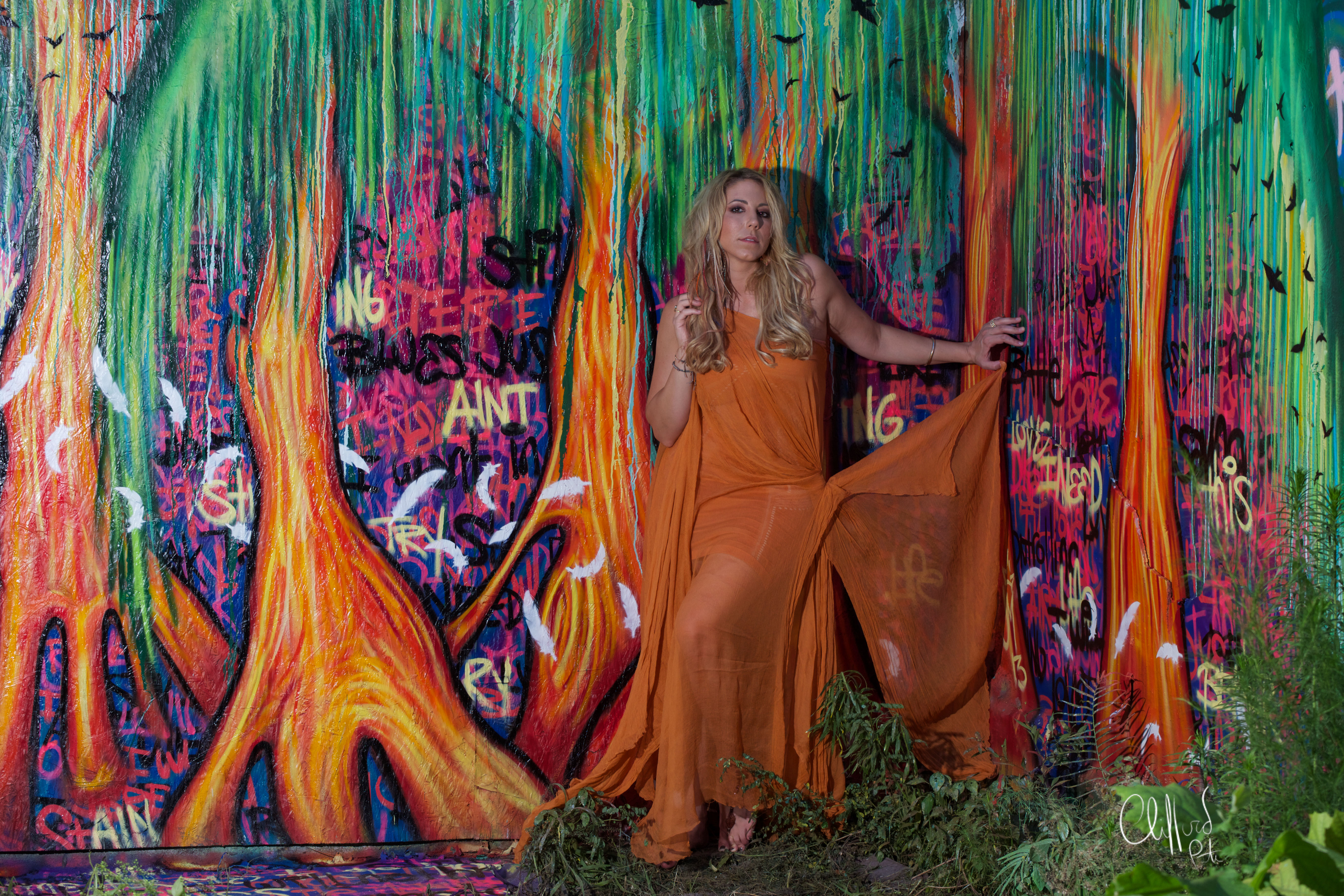
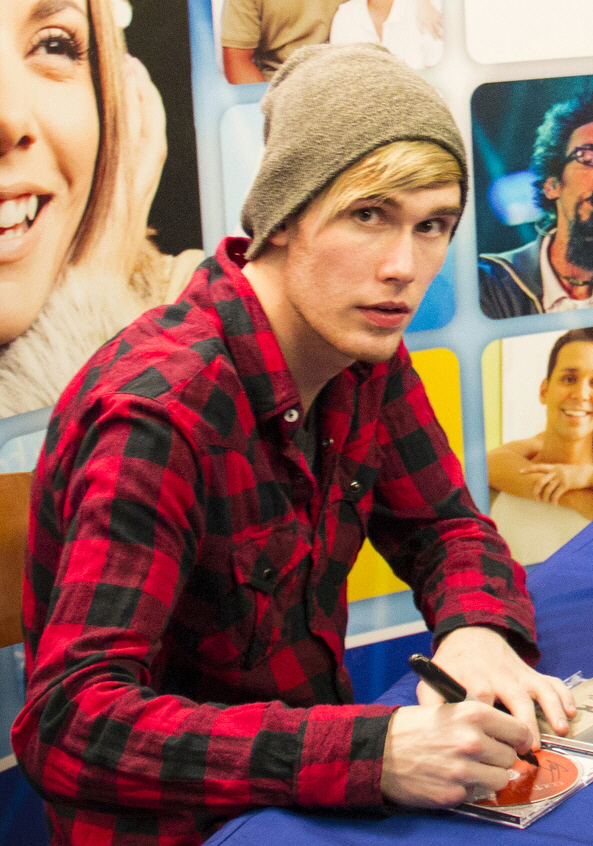
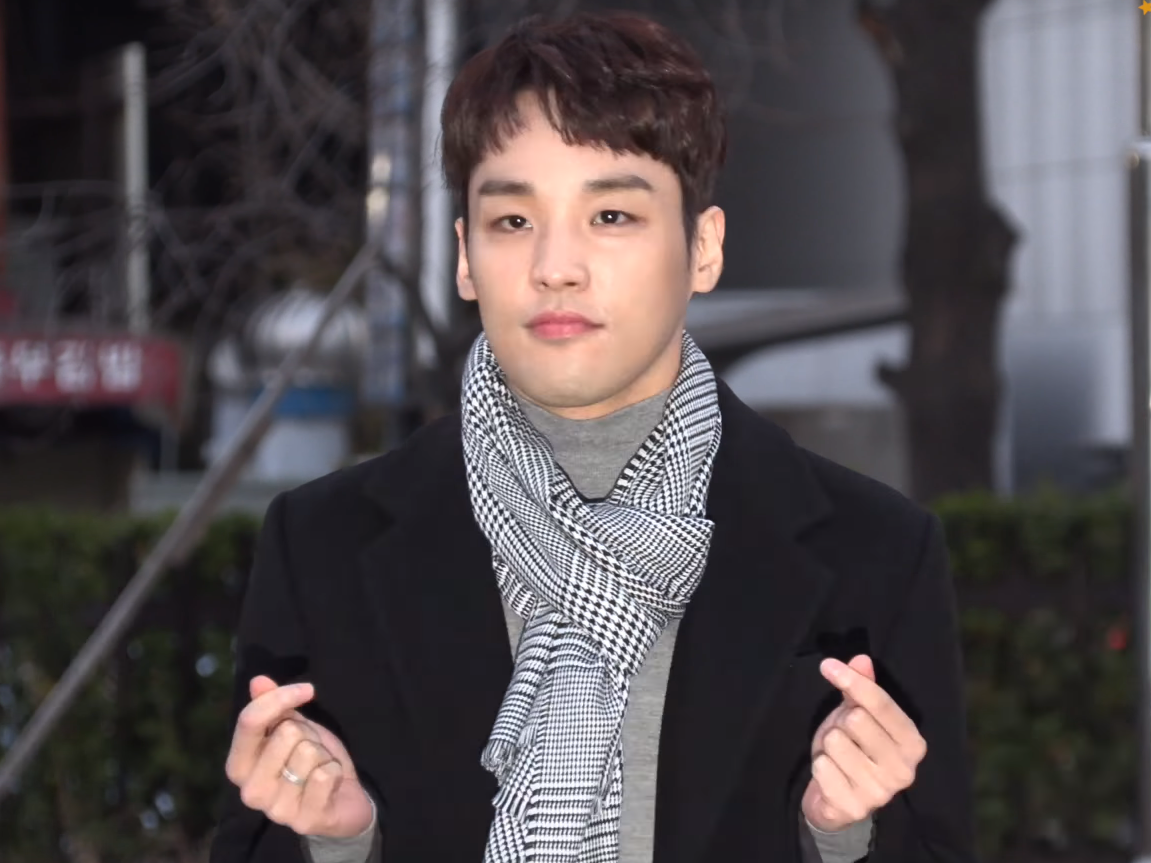
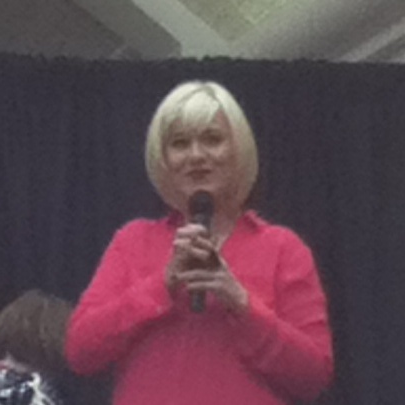
From left to right: Elise Testone, Colton Dixon, Heejun Han, and Erika Van Pelt
- Phillip Phillips (born September 20, 1990) was from Leesburg, Georgia. He auditioned in North Charleston, singing "Superstition" by Stevie Wonder and Michael Jackson's "Thriller" with the guitar. He performed "I Only Have Eyes For You" with Heejun Han, Neco Starr, and Jairon Jackson in Hollywood.
- Jessica Sanchez (born August 4, 1995) was from San Diego, California. She auditioned in San Diego. She performed "It Doesn't Matter Anymore" with DeAndre Brackensick and Candice Glover in Las Vegas. She also performed "The Prayer" by Andrea Bocelli.
- Joshua Ledet (born April 9, 1992) was from Westlake, Louisiana. He had originally auditioned for the tenth season, but did not make it past the audition stage. He auditioned in Houston, and was dubbed "Mantasia" (ie. the male version of American Idol third season winner Fantasia Barrino) during semifinals. He performed "Blue Suede Shoes" with Shannon Magrane, Amber Holcomb, and Curtis Finch, Jr.
- Hollie Cavanagh (born July 5, 1993) was originally from Liverpool, England, but grew up in McKinney, Texas. She auditioned in Galveston. She had originally auditioned for the tenth season, but was encouraged by Jennifer Lopez to return in a couple of years with practice. Hollie sang "Mr. Sandman" with Naomi Gillies and Marissa Pontecorvo in Las Vegas. She also sang "Change" by American Idol fourth season winner Carrie Underwood.
- Skylar Laine (born February 1, 1994) was from Brandon, Mississippi. She auditioned in Galveston, singing "Hell on Heels" by Pistol Annies. In Las Vegas, she performed "Dedicated to the One I Love" with Colton Dixon, Chase Likens, and Cari Quoyeser.
- Elise Testone (born July 29, 1983) was from Mount Pleasant, South Carolina. She was originally from Kinnelon, New Jersey. She auditioned in North Charleston with "Get It While You Can" by Janis Joplin.
- Colton Dixon (born October 19, 1991) was from Murfreesboro, Tennessee. He auditioned in North Charleston with his younger sister, Schyler. He and Schyler had originally auditioned for the tenth season, but were both cut before the semifinals. Dixon returned in the eleventh season; however he did not plan to audition, and was simply accompanying his sister to her audition. The judges implored Dixon to audition as well, where he sang David Cook's "Permanent". Colton performed "Dedicated to the One I Love" with Skylar Laine, Chase Likens, and Cari Quoyeser in Las Vegas. In Las Vegas, Schyler was eliminated, bringing Colton to tears. He performed the Coldplay song "Fix You", and dedicated it to his sister.
- DeAndre Brackensick (born October 21, 1994) was from San Jose, California. He had originally auditioned for the tenth season, but was cut before the semifinals. He auditioned in San Diego. He performed "It Doesn't Matter Anymore" with Jessica Sanchez and Candice Glover in Las Vegas.
- Heejun Han (born April 20, 1989) was from Flushing, New York. He and his family migrated from Anyang, South Korea, when he was a child. He auditioned in Pittsburgh with "How Am I Supposed to Live Without You". His audition brought Jennifer Lopez to tears, and Steven Tyler stated: "I think you are really great. I think you could be the American Idol."
- Erika Van Pelt (born December 12, 1985) was from South Kingstown, Rhode Island. She auditioned in Pittsburgh with "Will You Love Me Tomorrow" by the Shirelles.
- Shannon Magrane (born October 21, 1995) was from Tampa, Florida. She is the daughter of Tampa Bay Rays broadcaster and former St. Louis Cardinals pitcher Joe Magrane. She auditioned in North Charleston with "Something's Got a Hold on Me" by Etta James.
- Jermaine Jones (born November 3, 1986) was from Pine Hill, New Jersey. He auditioned in Portland. Jones was not originally chosen for the semifinals, but was called back after the top 24 had been selected. On March 13, he was disqualified for having concealed prior arrests and outstanding warrants.
- Jeremy Rosado (born March 24, 1992) was from Valrico, Florida. Rosado had previously auditioned for American Idol four times.

== Finals ==
There were twelve weeks of finals with thirteen contestants competing. At least one contestant was eliminated every week based on the public's votes, although the judges could veto one elimination through the use of the "judges' save". On March 15, 2012, during what would have been the top 12, it was announced that Jermaine Jones had been disqualified.

Color key:

This contestant was saved by America's vote.
This contestant was in the bottom two or three, but was saved by America's vote.
This contestant was saved from elimination by the judges.
This contestant was eliminated.
This contestant won American Idol.
This contestant was the runner-up.

=== Top 13 – Whitney Houston & Stevie Wonder ===
Mary J. Blige served as a guest mentor this week. This week, all of the ladies performed one song from the Whitney Houston discography and all of the men performed one song from the Stevie Wonder discography. In a twist, the bottom three from each group were announced the next night. The man and the woman who each received the fewest votes faced the judges, who had to decide which contestant would be saved and which would be eliminated. Contestants are listed in the order they performed.

Contestant	Whitney Houston or Stevie Wonder song	Result
Joshua Ledet	"I Wish"	Bottom three
Elise Testone	"I'm Your Baby Tonight"	Saved by the judges
Jermaine Jones	"Knocks Me Off My Feet"	Bottom two
Erika Van Pelt	"I Believe in You and Me"	Bottom three
Colton Dixon	"Lately"	Safe
Shannon Magrane	"I Have Nothing"	Bottom two
DeAndre Brackensick	"Master Blaster (Jammin')"	Safe
Skylar Laine	"Where Do Broken Hearts Go"	Safe
Heejun Han	"All in Love Is Fair"	Safe
Hollie Cavanagh	"All the Man That I Need"	Safe
Jeremy Rosado	"Ribbon in the Sky"	Eliminated
Jessica Sanchez	"I Will Always Love You"	Safe
Phillip Phillips	"Superstition"	Safe

Non-competition performance
Performers	Song
Top 13	"As"
Lauren Alaina	"Georgia Peaches"
Mary J. Blige	"Why"

=== Top 11 – Contestants' birth year ===
Jermaine Jones was disqualified prior to the performance show for failing to disclose his criminal past. Footage of executive producers Nigel Lythgoe and Ken Warwick confronting Jones was shown during what would have been his performance slot, and he was not replaced in the competition. Footage of his rehearsal singing "Somewhere Out There" and his statement was shown during what would have been his performance slot.

will.i.am served as a guest mentor this week. Contestants each performed one song from the year they were born, and are listed in the order they performed.

Contestant	Song	Birth year	Result
Phillip Phillips	"Hard to Handle"	1990	Safe
Jessica Sanchez	"Turn the Beat Around"	1995	Safe
Heejun Han	"Right Here Waiting"	1989	Safe
Elise Testone	"Let's Stay Together"	1983	Bottom three
DeAndre Brackensick	"Endless Love"	1994	Safe
Shannon Magrane	"One Sweet Day"	1995	Eliminated
Colton Dixon	"Broken Heart"	1991	Safe
Erika Van Pelt	"Heaven"	1985	Bottom three
Skylar Laine	"Love Sneakin' Up On You"	1994	Safe
Joshua Ledet	"When a Man Loves a Woman"	1992	Safe
Hollie Cavanagh	"The Power of Love"	1993	Safe

Non-competition performance
Performers	Song
Demi Lovato	"Give Your Heart a Break"
Daughtry	"Outta My Head"

=== Top 10 – Billy Joel ===
P. Diddy was a guest mentor for this week. Each contestant performed one song from the Billy Joel discography, and are listed in the order they performed.

During the results show, the top 10 contestants performed "Happy Birthday to You" along with Joe Perry to celebrate the birthday of judge Steven Tyler.

Contestant	Billy Joel song	Result
DeAndre Brackensick	"Only the Good Die Young"	Bottom three
Erika Van Pelt	"New York State of Mind"	Eliminated
Joshua Ledet	"She's Got a Way"	Safe
Skylar Laine	"Shameless"	Safe
Elise Testone	"Vienna"	Safe
Phillip Phillips	"Movin' Out (Anthony's Song)"	Safe
Hollie Cavanagh	"Honesty"	Safe
Heejun Han	"My Life"	Bottom three
Jessica Sanchez	"Everybody Has a Dream"	Safe
Colton Dixon	"Piano Man"	Safe

Non-competition performance
Performers	Song
Top 10	"The Longest Time"
Top 10 with Joe Perry	"Happy Birthday to You"
Lana Del Rey	"Video Games"
Haley Reinhart	"Free"

=== Top 9 – Personal idols ===
Stevie Nicks served as a guest mentor this week. Contestants performed two songs each from their own personal idols: one solo and one trio with two fellow contestants. Contestants are listed in the order they performed.

Contestant	Order	Song	Personal idol	Result
Colton Dixon	1	"Everything"	Lifehouse	Safe
Skylar Laine	2	"Gunpowder & Lead"	Miranda Lambert	Bottom three
Heejun Han	4	"A Song for You"	Donny Hathaway	Eliminated
Hollie Cavanagh	5	"Jesus, Take the Wheel"	Carrie Underwood	Bottom three
DeAndre Brackensick	6	"Sometimes I Cry"	Eric Benét	Safe
Jessica Sanchez	7	"Sweet Dreams"	Beyoncé	Safe
Phillip Phillips	9	"Still Rainin'"	Jonny Lang	Safe
Joshua Ledet	10	"Without You"	Mariah Carey	Safe
Elise Testone	12	"Whole Lotta Love"	Led Zeppelin	Safe
Colton Dixon, Phillip Phillips & Elise Testone	3	"Landslide" "Edge of Seventeen" "Don't Stop"	Fleetwood Mac & Stevie Nicks	
DeAndre Brackensick, Heejun Han & Joshua Ledet	8	"The Lady in My Life" "Rock with You" "P.Y.T. (Pretty Young Thing)"	Michael Jackson	
Hollie Cavanagh, Skylar Laine & Jessica Sanchez	11	"Like a Prayer" "Borderline" "Express Yourself"	Madonna	

Non-competition performance
Performers	Song
Nicki Minaj	"Starships"
Scotty McCreery	"Water Tower Town"

=== Top 8 – Music from the 1980s ===
Gwen Stefani and Tony Kanal served as guest mentors this week. Each contestant performed two songs: one solo and one duet with a fellow contestant. Contestants are listed in the order they performed.

Contestant	Order	1980s song	Result
DeAndre Brackensick	1	"I Like It"	Eliminated
Elise Testone	2	"I Want to Know What Love Is"	Bottom three
Phillip Phillips	4	"That's All"	Safe
Joshua Ledet	6	"If You Don't Know Me by Now"	Safe
Jessica Sanchez	7	"How Will I Know"	Safe
Hollie Cavanagh	9	"Flashdance... What a Feeling"	Bottom three
Colton Dixon	11	"Time After Time"	Safe
Skylar Laine	12	"Wind Beneath My Wings"	Safe
Colton Dixon & Skylar Laine	3	"Islands in the Stream"	
DeAndre Brackensick & Hollie Cavanagh	5	"I'm So Excited"	
Phillip Phillips & Elise Testone	8	"Stop Draggin' My Heart Around"	
Joshua Ledet & Jessica Sanchez	10	"I Knew You Were Waiting (For Me)"	

Non-competition performance
Performers	Song
Jennifer Lopez, featuring Pitbull	"Dance Again"
The Wanted	"Glad You Came"
Kellie Pickler	"Where's Tammy Wynette"

=== Top 7 (April 12) – Music from the 2010s ===
Akon was a guest mentor this week. Each contestant performed two songs: one solo and either one duet with a fellow contestant or one trio with two fellow contestants. Contestants are listed in the order they performed. The judges chose to use their "judges' save" when Jessica Sanchez was announced as the performer to be eliminated. As a result, no one was eliminated this week.

Contestant	Order	2010s song	Result
Skylar Laine	1	"Didn't You Know How Much I Loved You"	Safe
Colton Dixon	2	"Love the Way You Lie"	Safe
Jessica Sanchez	4	"Stuttering"	Saved by the judges
Joshua Ledet	5	"Runaway Baby"	Bottom three
Hollie Cavanagh	7	"Fuckin' Perfect"	Safe
Phillip Phillips	8	"Give a Little More"	Safe
Elise Testone	10	"You and I"	Bottom three
Phillip Phillips & Elise Testone	3	"Somebody That I Used to Know"	
Colton Dixon & Skylar Laine	6	"Don't You Wanna Stay"	
Hollie Cavanagh, Joshua Ledet & Jessica Sanchez	9	"Stronger (What Doesn't Kill You)"	

Non-competition performance
Performers	Song
Top 7	"Raise Your Glass"
James Durbin	"Higher Than Heaven"
Jennifer Hudson & Ne-Yo	"Think Like a Man"

=== Top 7 (April 19) – Music from now & then ===
Each contestant performed two songs: one Billboard number one hit from the 21st century and one song from the classic soul era. Contestants are listed in the order they performed.

Contestant	Order	Song	Result
Hollie Cavanagh	1	"Rolling in the Deep"	Bottom three
Hollie Cavanagh	8	"Son of a Preacher Man"	Bottom three
Colton Dixon	2	"Bad Romance"	Eliminated
Colton Dixon	9	"September"	Eliminated
Elise Testone	3	"No One"	Bottom three
Elise Testone	10	"Let's Get It On"	Bottom three
Phillip Phillips	4	"U Got It Bad"	Safe
Phillip Phillips	11	"In the Midnight Hour"	Safe
Jessica Sanchez	5	"Fallin'"	Safe
Jessica Sanchez	12	"Try a Little Tenderness"	Safe
Skylar Laine	6	"Born This Way"	Safe
Skylar Laine	13	"I Heard It Through the Grapevine"	Safe
Joshua Ledet	7	"I Believe"	Safe
Joshua Ledet	14	"A Change Is Gonna Come"	Safe

Non-competition performance
Performers	Song
Top 7	"Dancing in the Street"
Kris Allen	"The Vision of Love"
LMFAO	"Sorry for Party Rocking"

=== Top 6 – Queen ===
Each contestant performed two songs, one of which was from the Queen discography. Contestants are listed in the order they performed.

Contestant	Order	Song	Result
Jessica Sanchez	1	"Bohemian Rhapsody"	Safe
Jessica Sanchez	7	"Dance with My Father"	Safe
Skylar Laine	2	"The Show Must Go On"	Bottom three
Skylar Laine	8	"Tattoos on This Town"	Bottom three
Joshua Ledet	3	"Crazy Little Thing Called Love"	Safe
Joshua Ledet	9	"Ready for Love"	Safe
Elise Testone	4	"I Want It All"	Eliminated
Elise Testone	10	"Bold as Love"	Eliminated
Phillip Phillips	5	"Fat Bottomed Girls"	Safe
Phillip Phillips	11	"The Stone"	Safe
Hollie Cavanagh	6	"Save Me"	Bottom two
Hollie Cavanagh	12	"The Climb"	Bottom two

Non-competition performance
Performers	Song
Top 6 with Brian May & Roger Taylor	Queen medley: "Fat Bottomed Girls" "Another One Bites the Dust" "We Will Rock You" "We Are the Champions"
Queen Extravaganza	"Somebody to Love"
Stefano Langone	"I'm on a Roll"
Katy Perry	"Part of Me"

=== Top 5 – Music from the 1960s & British pop ===
Steven Van Zandt served as a guest mentor this week. Each contestant performed two songs: one solo and either one duet with a fellow contestant or one trio with two fellow contestants. Contestants are listed in the order they performed.

Contestant	Order	Song	Result
Hollie Cavanagh	1	"River Deep – Mountain High"	Bottom two
Hollie Cavanagh	7	"Bleeding Love"	Bottom two
Phillip Phillips	2	"The Letter"	Safe
Phillip Phillips	8	"Time of the Season"	Safe
Skylar Laine	3	"Fortunate Son"	Eliminated
Skylar Laine	10	"You Don't Have to Say You Love Me"	Eliminated
Jessica Sanchez	5	"Proud Mary"	Safe
Jessica Sanchez	11	"You Are So Beautiful"	Safe
Joshua Ledet	6	"Ain't Too Proud to Beg"	Safe
Joshua Ledet	12	"To Love Somebody"	Safe
Joshua Ledet & Phillip Phillips	4	"You've Lost That Lovin' Feelin'"	
Hollie Cavanagh, Skylar Laine & Jessica Sanchez	9	"(Your Love Keeps Lifting Me) Higher and Higher"	

Non-competition performance
Performers	Song
Coldplay	"Paradise"
Carrie Underwood	"Blown Away"
Coldplay	"Every Teardrop Is a Waterfall"

=== Top 4 – Music of California & songs the contestants wish they'd written ===
Each contestant performed three songs: one solo, one duet with a fellow contestant, and one song with all four contestants. Contestants are listed in the order they performed.

Contestant	Order	Song	Result
Phillip Phillips	1	"Have You Ever Seen the Rain?"	Safe
Phillip Phillips	8	"Volcano"	Safe
Hollie Cavanagh	2	"Faithfully"	Eliminated
Hollie Cavanagh	9	"I Can't Make You Love Me"	Eliminated
Joshua Ledet	3	"You Raise Me Up"	Safe
Joshua Ledet	10	"It's a Man's Man's Man's World"	Safe
Jessica Sanchez	4	"Steal Away"	Safe
Jessica Sanchez	11	"And I Am Telling You I'm Not Going"	Safe
Joshua Ledet & Phillip Phillips	5	"This Love"	
Hollie Cavanagh & Jessica Sanchez	6	"Eternal Flame"	
Hollie Cavanagh, Joshua Ledet, Phillip Phillips & Jessica Sanchez	7	"Waiting for a Girl Like You"	

Non-competition performance
Performers	Song
Top 4	"California Dreamin'"
David Cook	"The Last Song I'll Write for You"
Jennifer Lopez	"Dance Again"

=== Top 3 ===
Each contestant performed three songs: one chosen by one of the judges, one chosen by the contestant, and one chosen by mentor Jimmy Iovine. Contestants are listed in the order they performed.

Contestant	Order	Song	Result
Joshua Ledet	1	"I'd Rather Go Blind" (Note: Song chosen by Randy Jackson.)	Eliminated
Joshua Ledet	4	"Imagine"	Eliminated
Joshua Ledet	7	"No More Drama" (Note: Song chosen by Jimmy Iovine.)	Eliminated
Jessica Sanchez	2	"My All" (Note: Song chosen by Jennifer Lopez.)	Safe
Jessica Sanchez	5	"I Don't Want to Miss a Thing"	Safe
Jessica Sanchez	8	"I'll Be There"	Safe
Phillip Phillips	3	"Beggin'" (Note: Song chosen by Steven Tyler.)	Safe
Phillip Phillips	6	"Disease"	Safe
Phillip Phillips	9	"We've Got Tonite"	Safe

Non-competition performance
Performers	Song
Top 3	"Got to Get You into My Life"
Lisa Marie Presley	"You Ain't Seen Nothin' Yet
Adam Lambert	"Never Close Our Eyes"

=== Top 2 – Finale ===
Each contestant performed three songs, one of which was chosen by producer Simon Fuller, and are listed in the order they performed.

Contestant	Order	Song	Result
Jessica Sanchez	1	"I Have Nothing" (Note: Song chosen by Simon Fuller.)	Runner-up
Jessica Sanchez	3	"The Prayer"	Runner-up
Jessica Sanchez	5	"Change Nothing"	Runner-up
Phillip Phillips	2	"Stand by Me"	Winner
Phillip Phillips	4	"Movin' Out (Anthony's Song)"	Winner
Phillip Phillips	6	"Home"	Winner

Non-competition performance
Performers	Song
Jason Derulo	"Undefeated" (Note: Performed on the May 22 episode.)
Scotty McCreery	"Please Remember Me"
Top 12 (Note: Jermaine Jones, Phillip Phillips, and Jessica Sanchez were not a part of this group performance.)	"Runaway Baby"
Phillip Phillips with John Fogerty	"Have You Ever Seen the Rain?" "Bad Moon Rising"
Joshua Ledet with Fantasia Barrino	"Take Me to the Pilot"
Shannon Magrane, Erika Van Pelt, Elise Testone, Skylar Laine, Hollie Cavanagh & Jessica Sanchez with Chaka Khan	Chaka Khan medley: "Ain't Nobody" "Through the Fire" "I'm Every Woman"
Rihanna	"Where Have You Been"
Skylar Laine with Reba McEntire	"Turn On the Radio"
Jessica Sanchez	"I Will Always Love You"
Jeremy Rosado, Heejun Han, DeAndre Brackensick, Colton Dixon & Joshua Ledet with Neil Diamond	Neil Diamond medley: "America" "Cracklin' Rosie" "I'm a Believer" "Sweet Caroline"
Jennifer Lopez, Lil Jon & Flo Rida	"Goin' In"
Jennifer Lopez & Wisin & Yandel	"Follow the Leader"
Hollie Cavanagh with Jordin Sparks	"You'll Never Walk Alone"
Jeremy Rosado, Heejun Han, DeAndre Brackensick, Colton Dixon, & Joshua Ledet	Bee Gees medley: "Words" "How Deep Is Your Love" "How Can You Mend a Broken Heart" "To Love Somebody"
Jessica Sanchez with Jennifer Holliday	"And I Am Telling You I'm Not Going"
Aerosmith	"Legendary Child" "Walk This Way"
Phillip Phillips & Jessica Sanchez	"Up Where We Belong"
Phillip Phillips	"Home"

== Elimination chart ==
Color key:

Winner
Runner-up
Did not perform
Saved by the public
Saved by the judges
Bottom two or three
Disqualified
Eliminated

American Idol (season 11) - Eliminations
Contestant	Pl.	Semifinals		Wild Card	Top 13 (Note: The bottom men and the bottom women were announced this week. The one man and the one woman who received the fewest votes faced the judges, who had to decide which contestant would be saved and which would be eliminated.)	Top 11	Top 10	Top 9	Top 8	Top 7 (Note: Because the judges used their one "judges' save" to save Jessica Sanchez, the top 7 remained intact for another week.)		Top 6	Top 5	Top 4	Top 3	Finale
Contestant	Pl.	2/28	2/29	3/1	3/8	3/15	3/22	3/29	4/5	4/12	4/19	4/26	5/3	5/10	5/17	5/23
Phillip Phillips	1	Safe	N/A	N/A	Safe	Safe	Safe	Safe	Safe	Safe	Safe	Safe	Safe	Safe	Safe	Winner
Jessica Sanchez	2	N/A	Safe	N/A	Safe	Safe	Safe	Safe	Safe	Saved	Safe	Safe	Safe	Safe	Safe	Runner-up
Joshua Ledet	3	Safe	N/A	N/A	Bottom three	Safe	Safe	Safe	Safe	Bottom three	Safe	Safe	Safe	Safe	Eliminated	
Hollie Cavanagh	4	N/A	Safe	N/A	Safe	Safe	Safe	Bottom three	Bottom three	Safe	Bottom three	Bottom two	Bottom two	Eliminated		
Skylar Laine	5	N/A	Safe	N/A	Safe	Safe	Safe	Bottom three	Safe	Safe	Safe	Bottom three	Eliminated			
Elise Testone	6	N/A	Safe	N/A	Saved	Bottom three	Safe	Safe	Bottom three	Bottom three	Bottom three	Eliminated				
Colton Dixon	7	Safe	N/A	N/A	Safe	Safe	Safe	Safe	Safe	Safe	Eliminated					
DeAndre Brackensick	8	Wild Card	N/A	Saved	Safe	Safe	Bottom three	Safe	Eliminated							
Heejun Han	9	Safe	N/A	N/A	Safe	Safe	Bottom three	Eliminated								
Erika Van Pelt	10	N/A	Wild Card	Saved	Bottom three	Bottom three	Eliminated									
Shannon Magrane	11	N/A	Safe	N/A	Bottom two	Eliminated										
Jermaine Jones	12	Safe	N/A	N/A	Bottom two	Disqualified										
Jeremy Rosado	13	Wild Card	N/A	Saved	Eliminated											
Reed Grimm		Wild Card	N/A	Eliminated												
Jen Hirsh		N/A	Wild Card	Eliminated												
Brielle Von Hugel		N/A	Wild Card	Eliminated												
Baylie Brown		N/A	Eliminated													
Hallie Day		N/A	Eliminated													
Haley Johnsen		N/A	Eliminated													
Chelsea Sorrell		N/A	Eliminated													
Adam Brock		Eliminated														
Creighton Fraker		Eliminated														
Eben Franckewitz		Eliminated														
Chase Likens		Eliminated														
Aaron Marcellus		Eliminated														

== Compilation album ==
American Idol Season 11 Duets and Trios Highlights, a compilation album by the top 6 finalists, was released on July 3, 2012. It consisted of the following songs:

No.	Title	Length
1.	"(Your Love Keeps Lifting Me) Higher and Higher" (Hollie Cavanagh, Skylar Laine & Jessica Sanchez)	2:42
2.	"I Knew You Were Waiting (For Me)" (Joshua Ledet & Sanchez)	2:40
3.	"Stop Draggin' My Heart Around" (Phillip Phillips & Elise Testone)	2:35
4.	"This Love" (Ledet & Phillips)	2:52
5.	"Eternal Flame" (Cavanagh & Sanchez)	2:33

== Controversies ==
On March 14, finalist Jermaine Jones was disqualified for concealing arrests and outstanding warrants. Jones, however, denied that he had concealed his previous arrests and had admitted his arrests when he signed up for Idol. A police official where he was the target of two arrest warrants said that "the case wasn't big enough to merit going after him in California," and a New Jersey legislator commented that for the show "to expose, embarrass and interrogate a young man without an attorney in front of 40 million viewers was an outrage." Critics suggested that the show may have staged the disqualification to boost ratings. When asked about speculations that producers had had prior knowledge of his criminal past and that the producers were simply out to exploit him on-air, Jones replied that "I haven't even taken my mind into that and why they did what they did, because then I'll drive myself crazy."

== U.S. Nielsen ratings ==
The premiere was watched by 21.93 million viewers. While at the time it drew the second largest audience of any entertainment program in the television season, it was down 16 percent from the previous year's premiere, which was watched by 26.23 million viewers. After seven consecutive years as the most watched program on primetime television (eight years in the 18/49 demo), the eleventh season of American Idol came in second place to NBC Sunday Night Football in total viewers, as well as in the 18/49 demo.

Episode list

Show	Episode	Air date	Rating	Share	Rating/share 18–49	Viewers (millions)	Weekly rank	Note
1	"Savannah Auditions"	January 18, 2012	12.3	19	7.4/19	21.93	3	
2	"Pittsburgh Auditions"	January 19, 2012	10.3	16	5.7/15	18.02	4	
3	"San Diego Auditions"^{a}	January 22, 2012	N/A	N/A	7.9/21	19.70	N/A^{b}	
4	"Aspen Auditions"	January 25, 2012	11.1	17	6.5/18	19.67	1	
5	"Houston/Galveston Auditions"	January 26, 2012	10.0	16	5.5/16	17.14	2	
6	"Portland Auditions"	February 1, 2012	10.6	17	6.0/17	18.48	4	
7	"St. Louis Auditions"	February 2, 2012	10.2	16	5.5/15	17.41	5	
8	"Hollywood Week, Part 1"	February 8, 2012	11.0	17	6.1/17	19.32	3	
9	"Hollywood Week, Part 2"	February 9, 2012	10.5	17	5.8/16	18.13	4	
10	"Hollywood Week, Part 3"	February 15, 2012	10.8	17	6.1/16	18.89	2	
11	"Las Vegas Round"	February 16, 2012	9.8	15	5.1/14	16.71	3	
12	"Final Judgement Part 1"	February 22, 2012	9.3	15	5.1/14	16.10	6	
13	"Final Judgement Part 2"	February 23, 2012	9.3	15	4.5/13	15.64	8	
14	"Semifinalists Boys Perform"	February 28, 2012	9.4	14	5.1/13	16.11	4	
15	"Semifinalists Girls Perform"	February 29, 2012	10.1	16	5.0/13	17.23	3	
16	"Wildcard Results/Finalists Chosen"	March 1, 2012	10.8	17	5.4/15	18.27	1	
17	"Top 13 Perform"	March 7, 2012	10.9	17	5.7/16	18.69	1	
18	"Top 13 Results"	March 8, 2012	10.2	16	4.9/14	17.27	2	
19	"Top 11 Perform"	March 14, 2012	10.7	17	5.4/16	18.38	1	
20	"Top 11 Results"	March 15, 2012	9.4	16	4.6/14	16.02	2	
21	"Top 10 Perform"	March 21, 2012	10.4	17	5.1/15	17.21	3	
22	"Top 10 Results"	March 22, 2012	9.3	15	4.2/13	15.58	5	
23	"Top 9 Perform"	March 28, 2012	10.5	17	5.3/15	17.87	3	
24	"Top 9 Results"	March 29, 2012	9.6	16	4.4/13	15.87	5	
25	"Top 8 Perform"	April 4, 2012	10.2	17	4.9/14	17.09	2	
26	"Top 8 Results"	April 5, 2012	8.8	15	3.9/13	14.34	5	
27	"Top 7 Perform"	April 11, 2012	10.0	18	5.0/14	16.81	2	
28	"Top 7 Results"	April 12, 2012	9.7	16	4.3/13	15.81	4	
29	"Top 7 Redux Perform"	April 18, 2012	10.7	16	4.8/14	16.89	2	
30	"Top 7 Redux Results"	April 19, 2012	9.2	16	4.0/13	14.99	4	
31	"Top 6 Perform"	April 25, 2012	10.2	16	4.8/14	16.87	2	
32	"Top 6 Results"	April 26, 2012	9.1	15	4.0/12	14.87	3	
33	"Top 5 Perform"	May 2, 2012	10.2	16	4.7/14	16.66	2	
34	"Top 5 Results"	May 3, 2012	9.4	16	4.0/13	15.56	4	
35	"Top 4 Perform"	May 9, 2012	10.0	16	4.5/13	16.46	2	
36	"Top 4 Results"	May 10, 2012	9.5	16	4.0/13	15.62	4	
37	"Top 3 Perform"	May 16, 2012	10.5	17	4.9/14	17.68	2	
38	"Top 3 Results"	May 17, 2012	9.8	17	4.4/15	16.40	3	
39	"Top 2 Perform"	May 22, 2012	8.7	14	4.4/14	14.85	4	
40	"Finale"	May 23, 2012	12.2	20	6.4/18	21.49	1	

- ^Note a This episode was shown on Sunday, January 22, 2012, after the NFC Championship Game, but was repeated on Tuesday, January 24, 2012 with ratings of 5.7/9 overall and 3.4/9 for the 18/49 demographic. Overall, the episode averaged 9.64 million viewers.
- ^Note bEpisode was bumped out of primetime due to the NFC Championship Game going into overtime, therefore it was not included in the weekly rankings.

== See also ==
- American Idols LIVE! Tour 2012
