= Elise Testone =

American singer-songwriter (born 1983)

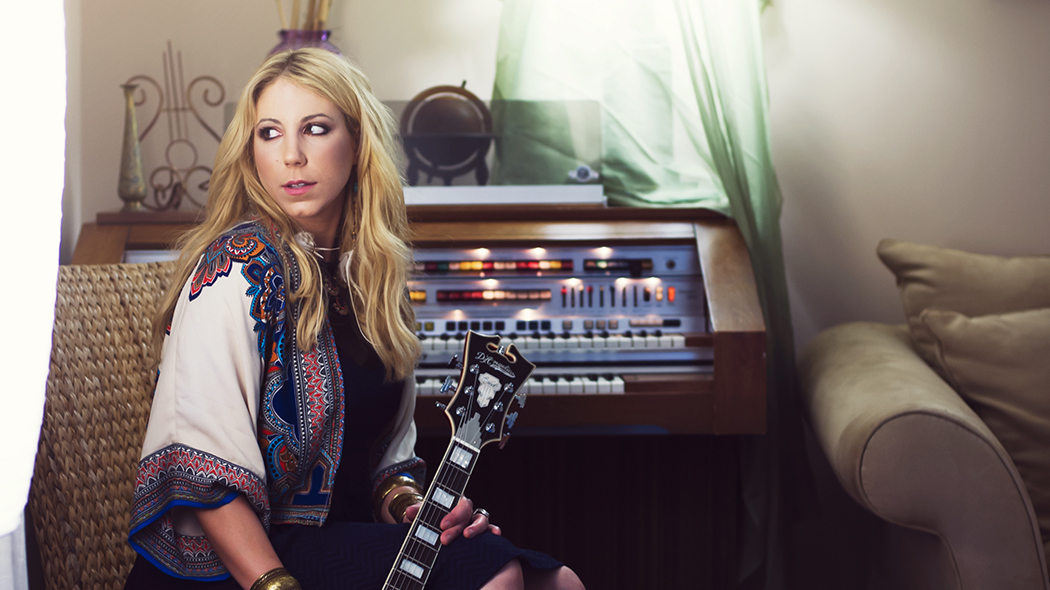
- Testone in 2014

Background information
- Born: Elise Nicole Testone; July 29, 1983 (age 43); Kinnelon, New Jersey, U.S.
- Origin: Charleston, South Carolina
- Genres: Rock, blues, soul, jazz, funk
- Occupation: Singer-songwriter
- Instruments: Vocals, piano, guitar, drums, tambourine, cello
- Years active: 2005–present
- Formerly of: The Freeloaders, James Brown Dance Party, Slanguage

Elise Nicole Testone (/ˈtɛstoʊn/; born July 29, 1983) is an American singer and songwriter from Mount Pleasant, South Carolina. She placed sixth on the eleventh season of American Idol. Her debut album In This Life was released in February 2014, and her second album, This Is Love, was released in 2019.

== Early life ==
Elise Testone was born on July 29, 1983, to LuAnne and Victor Testone, both of Italian ancestry. She grew up in Kinnelon, New Jersey, and got her first job making sandwiches at Taste of Reality, a local deli. At the age of 13, Testone took lessons with New York City vocal coach Judy Hages. After graduating from Kinnelon High School in 2001, Testone attended Coastal Carolina University in Conway, South Carolina, earning a bachelor's degree in music in 2005.

In 2006, Testone moved to Charleston, South Carolina and began collaborating with local rock, pop, funk, and soul musicians, while writing her own blues and jazz songs. In a November 2008 interview, Testone said she worked at PawPurri for Pets in the mornings. In the afternoons, she was a vocal coach at Music Unlimited in Mount Pleasant, South Carolina. In the evenings, she performed regularly at restaurants and clubs in Charleston, South Carolina. Testone performs solo and with several Charleston groups, including The Freeloaders, James Brown Dance Party, and Slanguage. In October 2011, Testone and her band, The Freeloaders, won the Funk/Soul/R&B Artist of the Year award in the Charleston City Paper’s Music issue. Testone received additional recognition from the Charleston City Paper in 2011, winning the staff pick for Best Tribute for Elise Testone's James Brown Dance Party.

Testone has performed as an opening act for various other artists, including Snoop Dogg, Nappy Roots, Seven Mary Three, and Kevin Costner and Modern West. She can play the piano, guitar, drums, tambourine and cello. Her favorite artists are Bonnie Raitt, Michael Jackson and Jimi Hendrix. Other musical influences include B.B. King, Tori Amos, Erykah Badu, Jewel and Lauryn Hill.

== American Idol ==
=== Overview ===
On July 22, 2011, Testone auditioned in North Charleston, South Carolina. She received a standing ovation in Vegas Round along with Reed Grimm, Eben Franckewitz and Haley Johnsen with their group performance of Bobby Vee's "The Night Has a Thousand Eyes."

In the semi-finals, Testone performed Adele's "One and Only" and was one of five female contestants to advance to the finals based on viewer votes.

In the first round of the finals, Testone performed Whitney Houston's "I'm Your Baby Tonight" and was the female contestant with the lowest number of votes. Between Testone and Jeremy Rosado, the male contestant with the lowest number of votes, the judges decided to eliminate Rosado. Testone and fellow contestant Jessica Sanchez received an endorsement from The X Factor season 1 finalist Chris Rene.

The following week, in the top eleven round, Testone performed "Let's Stay Together" by Al Green and received praise from the judges, with Randy Jackson proclaiming, "America, Elise is back!" Nonetheless, Testone was in the bottom three again. This was not well received by the judges, as Jennifer Lopez explained, "I’m not happy. It's not fair. Great performances should be rewarded. She was one of the best last night."

In the top ten round, Testone sang Billy Joel's "Vienna" and received a standing ovation from the judges. After spending two weeks in the bottom three, Testone was declared "safe" when the voting results were announced. Testone received a second consecutive standing ovation for her performance of Led Zeppelin's "Whole Lotta Love" in the top nine round, which critics considered to be her signature moment of the season. After seeing Testone rehearse before the performance, celebrity mentor Stevie Nicks enthusiastically stated, "If I needed a singer, I'd hire her in a second."

In the top six round, Testone performed Queen's "I Want It All" and The Jimi Hendrix Experience's "Bold as Love". The show's record producer mentor Jimmy Iovine called Testone "a great singer who makes bad [song] choices." She defended her song choices stating, "Those were the best choices for me, but probably the majority of people at home want to be able to sing along."

Testone was eliminated on April 26, 2012, finishing the competition in sixth place.

=== Performances/results ===
Episode	Theme	Song choice	Original artist	Order #	Result
Audition	Auditioner's Choice	"Get It While You Can"	Janis Joplin	N/A	Advanced
Hollywood Round, Part 1	First Solo	"Virtual Insanity"	Jamiroquai	N/A	Advanced
Hollywood Round, Part 2	Group Performance	"Some Kind of Wonderful"	Soul Brothers Six	N/A	Advanced
Hollywood Round, Part 3	Second Solo	Not aired		N/A	Advanced
Las Vegas Round	Songs from the 1950s Group Performance	"The Night Has a Thousand Eyes"	Bobby Vee	N/A	Advanced
Final Judgment	Final Solo	"It's a Man's Man's Man's World"	James Brown	N/A	Advanced
Top 25 (12 Women)	Personal Choice	"One and Only"	Adele	12	Advanced
Top 13	Whitney Houston	"I'm Your Baby Tonight"	Whitney Houston	2	Saved^{1}
Top 11	Year They Were Born	"Let's Stay Together"	Al Green	4	Bottom 3^{2}
Top 10	Billy Joel	"Vienna"	Billy Joel	5	Safe
Top 9	Their Personal Idols	Trio "Landslide" / "Edge of Seventeen" / "Don't Stop" with Colton Dixon & Phillip Phillips	Fleetwood Mac / Stevie Nicks	3	Safe
Top 9	Their Personal Idols	Solo "Whole Lotta Love"	Led Zeppelin	12	Safe
Top 8	Songs from the 1980s	Solo "I Want to Know What Love Is"	Foreigner	2	Bottom 3^{3}
Top 8	Songs from the 1980s	Duet "Stop Draggin' My Heart Around" with Phillip Phillips	Stevie Nicks & Tom Petty	8	Bottom 3^{3}
Top 7	Songs from the 2010s	Duet "Somebody That I Used to Know" with Phillip Phillips	Gotye feat. Kimbra	3	Bottom 3^{4}
Top 7	Songs from the 2010s	Solo "You and I"	Lady Gaga	10	Bottom 3^{4}
Top 7^{5}	Songs from Now & Then	"No One"	Alicia Keys	3	Bottom 3^{2}
Top 7^{5}	Songs from Now & Then	"Let's Get It On"	Marvin Gaye	10	Bottom 3^{2}
Top 6	Queen	"I Want It All"	Queen	4	Eliminated
Top 6	Contestant's Choice	"Bold as Love"	The Jimi Hendrix Experience	10	Eliminated

- ^Note 1When Ryan Seacrest announced the results for this particular night, Testone was the female contestant with the lowest number of votes. Between Testone and Jeremy Rosado, the male contestant with the lowest number of votes, the judges decided to eliminate Rosado and save Testone.
- ^Note 2 When Ryan Seacrest announced the results for this particular night, Testone was among the Bottom 3, but was declared safe first.
- ^Note 3 When Ryan Seacrest announced the results for this particular night, Testone was among the Bottom 3 but declared safe second, as DeAndre Brackensick was eliminated.
- ^Note 4 When Ryan Seacrest announced the results for this particular night, Testone was among the Bottom 3 but declared safe second, as Jessica Sanchez received the lowest number of votes and was saved by the judges.
- ^Note 5 Owing to the judges using their one save on Jessica Sanchez, the Top 7 remained intact for another week.

=== Post-Idol appearances ===
Her journey through American Idol made her realize that rock genre is her forte. While on American Idols LIVE! Tour 2012, Testone intends to write songs for her album that would include elements of rock, blues, jazz, soul, and funk. Following her elimination, Testone appeared on various talk shows, including Good Day L.A., The Today Show, Anderson, and The Ellen DeGeneres Show. Testone and fellow contestant Colton Dixon performed on The Tonight Show with Jay Leno on April 27, 2012. Testone also performed on Live! with Kelly on April 30, 2012, with a rendition of Adele's "One and Only". She treated Access Hollywood viewers to a reprise of "Let's Stay Together" by Al Green.

At the start of 2013, the singer gathered a number of local Charleston musicians to begin recording her debut album. Self-produced and focussing on her own songs, Testone used a varied of genres to express her personal experiences. Testone released her debut album, In This Life on February 11, 2014. In January 2015 she moved to New York, where she works as a vocal coach. In the same year she released the single "Now" while she continues to tour.

== Discography ==
=== Albums ===
Title	Album details	Peak chart positions		Sales
Title	Album details	US	CAN	Sales
In This Life	Released: February 16, 2014; Label: Red Tambo Records; Format: CD, digital download	—	—	—
This Is Love	Released: April 17, 2019; Label: Red Tambo Records; Format: CD, digital download	—	—	—

=== Singles ===
==== As lead artist ====
Year	Single	Peak chart positions	Album
Year	Single	US	Album
2014	"I Will Not Break"	—	In This Life
2015	"Help Me"	—	Non-album single
2015	"Time"	—	Non-album single
2015	"Now"	—	Non-album single

==== As featured artist ====
Year	Single	Artist	Peak chart positions	Album
Year	Single	Artist	US	Album
2011	"In a Sense"	Man on Fire	—	Chrysalis
2011	"A (Post Apocalyptic) Bedtime Story"	Man on Fire	—	Chrysalis
2012	"All for You"	Emotive	—	Non-album single
2012	"Gravity, Pt. 2"	Man on Fire	—	Non-album single
2015	"Over the Rainbow"	Kevin West	—	Non-album single

== Videography ==
=== Music videos ===
Year	Video	Director
2014	"I Will Not Break"	David Keller
2015	"Now"	Charlotte Savage
