= Joshua Ledet =

American singer (born 1992)

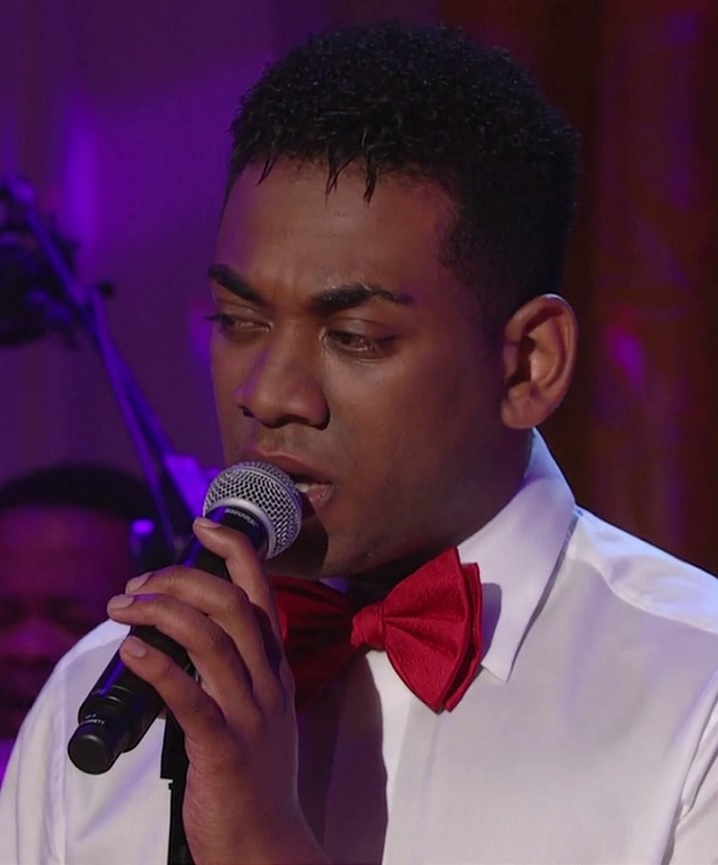
- Joshua Ledet

Background information
- Born: Westlake, Louisiana, U.S.
- Genres: Soul; gospel; R&B
- Occupation: Singer
- Instrument: Vocals
- Years active: 2012–present
- Label: Warner Music Group
- Website: www.joshualedet.com

Joshua Ledet is an American singer from Westlake, Louisiana. In 2012 he placed third in the eleventh season of American Idol. He is known for his "soaring, church-bred brand of old school soul music." In 2017, he released a self-titled EP.

== Early life ==
Ledet grew up in the small woody suburban city of Westlake in Louisiana's Calcasieu Parish, a part of the Lake Charles metropolitan area near Calcasieu River. In 2004, when he was eleven he watched another southern soul singer, Fantasia Barrino, sing "I Believe" in the final show and win the third season of American Idol and knew he would like to sing for a living. Ledet graduated from Westlake High School where he was a part of the school's theater program for all four years of school. The first concert he ever attended was by Beyoncé. He grew up singing and writing music in his family church, the House of Prayer Holiness Church. He has a large extended family.

When asked to tell something about himself that would surprise most people he stated it was that he only eats spicy food. He noted on the reality show that he missed Louisiana Creole cuisine so Louisiana Lt. Governor Jay Dardenne established a "Feed the Dream" project with the state's Seafood and Marketing Board to ship Ledet food each week including tamales, crawfish, boudin (a Cajun sausage), (chicken, duck and andouille) gumbo and jambalaya, donated by Louisiana restaurants and food manufacturers.

According to the American Idol highlights, Ledet was studying criminal justice at Lamar University in Beaumont, Texas.

== Musical influences ==
On his American Idol contestant page he notes his mother influences his musical style and he has had no formal singing training. His musical influences include Whitney Houston, Michael Jackson, Fantasia Barrino, James Brown, Luther Vandross, Stevie Wonder, and Elton John. In addition to soul, he enjoys country music. When asked what was the most embarrassing song he listens to, he said Aqua's "Barbie Girl."

== American Idol ==
Ledet originally auditioned a year earlier (for the tenth season), but did not make it past the audition stage. It has been revealed he was dealing with personal and family issues including situations caused by Hurricane Rita and its aftermath. His American Idol journey has been seen as somewhat effortless by music critics who note his soul singing is exceptional but may not be contemporary enough, however he is one of the best singers within the last few years of AI. His performances have repeatedly earned him standing ovations and high praise from the judges. He says he combats stage fright by tuning everything out. George Huff (season three in 2004) is the only other Louisiana singer to make the top ten shows.

Ledet auditioned for the eleventh season of AI in Houston, Texas. He almost did not travel to compete due to his fear of flying. He has been dubbed "Mantasia", the male version of former Idol contestant Fantasia, by fans, the media and even Fantasia herself. For the semi-finals he performed Jennifer Hudson's "You Pulled Me Through". He was one of the top five male vote getters and advanced to the top 13. In the top 13, he performed Stevie Wonder's "I Wish" and was one of the bottom three male voter getters, but was declared safe.

Ledet earned his first standing ovation in Hollywood Round, Part 3 when he sang his version of Jar of Hearts by Christina Perri. In the Top 8 round, Ledet earned his first standing ovation of the evening for his rendition of Harold Melvin & the Blue Notes's "If You Don't Know Me by Now". His duet of George Michael and Aretha Franklin's "I Knew You Were Waiting (For Me)" with fellow contestant Jessica Sanchez got a second standing ovation from the judges, prompting Jackson to declare "Two of the greatest singers to ever hit this competition ... This is one of the greatest performances I have seen on this show". He also performed It's a Man's Man's Man's World by James Brown, which was called "one of the best songs in the history of any singing competition," by Randy Jackson. Kris Allen, AI season eight winner, named the pair as his two favorites this season. During the top five show the judges gave Ledet the most praise of all the contestants for his versions of "Ain't Too Proud to Beg" by The Temptations (for theme songs from the 1960s), and the Bee Gees' "To Love Somebody" (for theme British Pop). Ledet received a record 18 standing ovations from the judges, including his duet with Season 3 winner Fantasia Barrino at Season 11 finale, the most of any AI contestant. He was eliminated on May 17, 2012, placing third overall with the lowest total of 90 million votes cast.

=== Performances/results ===
Episode	Theme	Song choice	Original artist	Result
Audition	Auditioner's Choice	"How Do I Live"	LeAnn Rimes	Advanced
Hollywood Round, Part 1	First Solo	Not aired		Advanced
Hollywood Round, Part 2	Group Performance	"Hit 'Em Up Style (Oops!)"	Blu Cantrell	Advanced
Hollywood Round, Part 3	Second Solo	"Jar of Hearts"	Christina Perri	Advanced
Las Vegas Round	Songs from the 1950s Group Performance	"At the Hop" / "Blue Suede Shoes" with Curtis Finch, Jr., Amber Holcomb & Shannon Magrane	Danny & the Juniors / Carl Perkins	Advanced
Final Judgment	Final Solo	"Up to the Mountain (MLK Song)"	Patty Griffin	Advanced
Top 25 (13 Men)	Personal Choice	"You Pulled Me Through"	Jennifer Hudson	Advanced
Top 13	Stevie Wonder	"I Wish"	Stevie Wonder	Bottom 3 Men^{1}
Top 11	Year They Were Born	"When a Man Loves a Woman"	Percy Sledge	Safe
Top 10	Billy Joel	"She's Got a Way"	Billy Joel	Safe
Top 9	Their Personal Idols	Trio "The Lady in My Life" / "Rock with You" / "P.Y.T. (Pretty Young Thing)" with DeAndre Brackensick & Heejun Han	Michael Jackson	Safe
Top 9	Their Personal Idols	Solo "Without You"	Badfinger	Safe
Top 8	Songs from the 1980s	Solo "If You Don't Know Me by Now"	Harold Melvin & the Blue Notes	Safe
Top 8	Songs from the 1980s	Duet "I Knew You Were Waiting (For Me)" with Jessica Sanchez	Aretha Franklin & George Michael	Safe
Top 7	Songs from the 2010s	Solo "Runaway Baby"	Bruno Mars	Bottom 3^{2}
Top 7	Songs from the 2010s	Trio "Stronger (What Doesn't Kill You)" with Hollie Cavanagh & Jessica Sanchez	Kelly Clarkson	Bottom 3^{2}
Top 7^{3}	Songs from Now & Then	"I Believe"	Fantasia Barrino	Safe
Top 7^{3}	Songs from Now & Then	"A Change Is Gonna Come"	Sam Cooke	Safe
Top 6	Queen	"Crazy Little Thing Called Love"	Queen	Safe
Top 6	Contestant's Choice	"Ready for Love"	India Arie	Safe
Top 5	Songs from the 1960s	Duet "You've Lost That Lovin' Feelin'" with Phillip Phillips	The Righteous Brothers	Safe
Top 5	Songs from the 1960s	Solo "Ain't Too Proud to Beg"	The Temptations	Safe
Top 5	British Pop	"To Love Somebody"	Bee Gees	Safe
Top 4	California Dreamin'	Solo "You Raise Me Up"	Secret Garden	Safe
Top 4	California Dreamin'	Duet "This Love" with Phillip Phillips	Maroon 5	Safe
Top 4	California Dreamin'	Quartet "Waiting for a Girl Like You" with Hollie Cavanagh, Phillip Phillips & Jessica Sanchez	Foreigner	Safe
Top 4	Songs They Wish They'd Written	"It's a Man's Man's Man's World"	James Brown	Safe
Top 3	Judges' Choice	"I'd Rather Go Blind"	Etta James	Eliminated
Top 3	Contestant's Choice	"Imagine"	John Lennon	Eliminated
Top 3	Jimmy Iovine's Choice	"No More Drama"	Mary J. Blige	Eliminated

- ^Note 1 When Ryan Seacrest announced the results in the particular night, Ledet was among in the Bottom 3 Men, but declared safe first.
- ^Note 2 Ledet was saved first from elimination.
- ^Note 3 Due to the judges using their one save on Jessica Sanchez, the Top 7 remained intact for another week.

== Post Idol ==
He took part in the American Idols LIVE! Tour 2012, which began July 6, 2012, and ran till September 21, 2012.

He performed "When a Man Loves a Woman" at the White House on April 9, 2013, at the "Memphis Soul" event. The show aired on April 16, at 8 pm. EST on PBS.

On August 26, 2013, he released an original, self-written song called "Here to Die" through YouTube. It has gained praise from Rolling Stone, which urged record labels to give it a commercial release.

In 2015, Ledet started working on his new material as an independent artist. He recorded a single, "Love Can Do," which was written and produced by Bernie Herms. On March 6, 2015, Ledet performed the single on a local TV show in Indonesia. "Love Can Do" was released by Warner Music Indonesia on August 4, and will be released independently in the United States on September 18.

Ledet performed "It's a Man's Man's Man's World" on the final episode of the fifteenth season of American Idol.

== Discography ==
=== Extended plays ===
Title	Details	Peak chart positions	Sales
Title	Details	US	Sales
American Idol Season 11 Highlights	Released: July 3, 2012; Label: 19 Recordings; Formats: CD	12	US: 530,000

Title	Year
Joshua Ledet	2017
