= Skylar Laine =

American singer

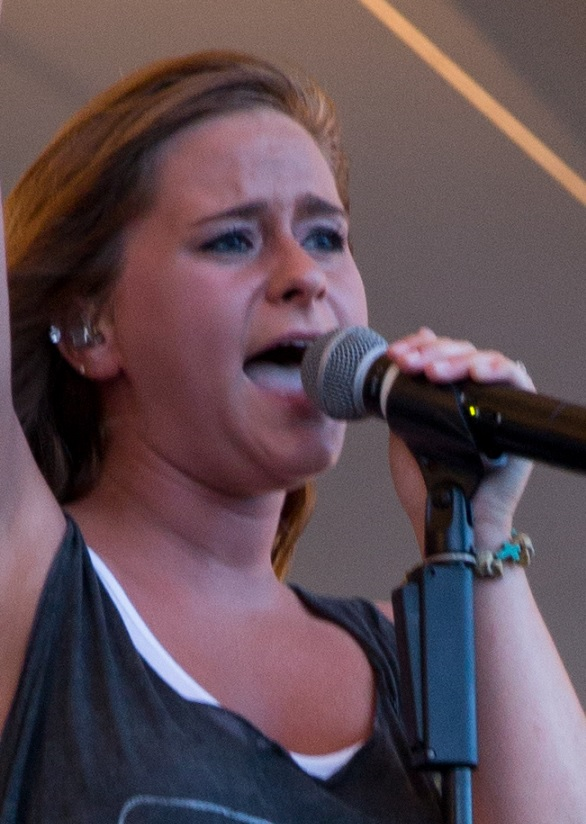
- Laine performing in North Charleston, South Carolina, on July 4, 2013

Background information
- Born: Skylar Laine Harden; February 1, 1994 (age 32); Jackson, Mississippi, U.S.
- Genres: Country, country rock
- Occupation: Singer-songwriter
- Instruments: Vocals, guitar
- Years active: 2012–present
- Label: 19 Entertainment (2012–13)
- Website: www.skylarlaine.com

Skylar Laine (born Skylar Laine Harden; February 1, 1994) is an American singer from Brandon, Mississippi. She placed fifth on the eleventh season of American Idol.

== Early life ==
Laine was born on February 1, 1994, in Jackson, Mississippi, to Ed and Mary Harden. She was raised in nearby Brandon, and graduated from Brandon High School a year early. Her musical influences are Miranda Lambert, Waylon Jennings and George Jones. Laine also worked at her family's business in Mississippi. She has also lived in Nashville, Tennessee.

== American Idol ==
=== Overview ===
Laine auditioned in Houston, Texas. In the semi-finals she performed "Stay with Me" by Faces. She was one of the top five female vote getters and advanced to the top 13. She is the second finalist from Mississippi; the first was Jasmine Murray from American Idol season 8. (Subsequent contestants from the state included season 15's Trent Harmon and La'Porsha Renae—who became the winner and runner-up, respectively.) After the competition, Laine moved to Nashville, Tennessee.

=== Performances/results ===
Episode	Theme	Song choice	Original artist	Order #	Result
Audition	Auditioner's Choice	"Hell on Heels"	Pistol Annies	N/A	Advanced
Hollywood Round, Part 1	First Solo	Not aired		N/A	Advanced
Hollywood Round, Part 2	Group Performance	"Son of a Preacher Man"	Dusty Springfield	N/A	Advanced
Hollywood Round, Part 3	Second Solo	"You Lie"	The Band Perry	N/A	Advanced
Las Vegas Round	Songs from the 1950s Group Performance	"Dedicated to the One I Love"	The "5" Royales	N/A	Advanced
Final Judgment	Final Solo	"Fancy"	Bobbie Gentry	N/A	Advanced
Top 25 (Top 12 Women)	Personal Choice	"Stay with Me"	Faces	6	Advanced
Top 13	Whitney Houston	"Where Do Broken Hearts Go"	Whitney Houston	8	Safe
Top 11	Year They Were Born	"Love Sneakin' Up On You"	Bonnie Raitt	9	Safe
Top 10	Billy Joel	"Shameless"	Billy Joel	4	Safe
Top 9	Their Personal Idols	Solo "Gunpowder & Lead"	Miranda Lambert	2	Bottom 3^{1}
Top 9	Their Personal Idols	Trio "Like a Prayer" / "Borderline" / "Express Yourself" with Hollie Cavanagh & Jessica Sanchez	Madonna	11	Bottom 3^{1}
Top 8	Songs from the 1980s	Duet "Islands in the Stream" with Colton Dixon	Kenny Rogers & Dolly Parton	3	Safe
Top 8	Songs from the 1980s	Solo "Wind Beneath My Wings"	Roger Whittaker	12	Safe
Top 7	Songs from the 2010s	Solo "Didn't You Know How Much I Loved You"	Kellie Pickler	1	Safe
Top 7	Songs from the 2010s	Duet "Don't You Wanna Stay" with Colton Dixon	Jason Aldean & Kelly Clarkson	6	Safe
Top 7^{2}	Songs from Now & Then	"Born This Way"	Lady Gaga	6	Safe
Top 7^{2}	Songs from Now & Then	"I Heard It Through the Grapevine"	The Miracles	13	Safe
Top 6	Queen	"The Show Must Go On"	Queen	2	Bottom 3^{1}
Top 6	Contestant's Choice	"Tattoos on This Town"	Jason Aldean	8	Bottom 3^{1}
Top 5	Songs from the 1960s	Solo "Fortunate Son"	Creedence Clearwater Revival	3	Eliminated
Top 5	Songs from the 1960s	Trio "(Your Love Keeps Lifting Me) Higher and Higher" with Hollie Cavanagh & Jessica Sanchez	Jackie Wilson	9	Eliminated
Top 5	British Pop	"You Don't Have to Say You Love Me"	Dusty Springfield	10	Eliminated

- ^Note 1 When Ryan Seacrest announced the results for this particular night, Laine was among the Bottom 3, but was declared safe first.
- ^Note 2 Due to the judges using their one save on Jessica Sanchez, the Top 7 remained intact for another week.

== Post Idol ==
She took part in the American Idols LIVE! Tour 2012, which began July 6, 2012, and ran till September 21, 2012.

It was announced on November 17, 2012, that Laine had signed with 19 Entertainment's management and had moved to Nashville, Tennessee, to work on her debut album. She has worked with songwriters such as Nathan Chapman, Brett James, Hillary Lindsey, Luke Laird, and Chris Tompkins. She also debuted an original song called "Settle Down," written by herself, Chris DeStefano and Anne Preven. In January 2013, she left 19 Entertainment's management because they were unable to find a record label for her, but she was still working on her album.

On July 10, 2015, her debut album, Dirt Covered Lace, was released.

== Discography ==
=== Albums ===
Dirt Covered Lace (2015)

=== Extended plays ===
Title	Details	Peak chart positions		Sales
Title	Details	US	US Country	Sales
American Idol Season 11 Highlights	Release date: July 3, 2012; Label: 19 Recordings; Formats: CD	64	12	US: 33,000
