= Raging Fire =

Raging Fire may refer to:

- Raging Fire (film), a 2021 Hong Kong film
- "Raging Fire" (song), a 2014 song by Phillip Phillips
- "Raging Fire", a 1978 song by Pablo Cruise from the album A Place in the Sun
