= The Battle for Everything =

Studio album by Five for Fighting
- Released: February 3, 2004
- Genre: Soft rock
- Length: 48:02
- Labels: Aware; Columbia
- Producers: Bill Bottrell; Gregg Wattenberg; John Ondrasik; Curt Schneider

Five for Fighting chronology
America Town (2000)	The Battle for Everything (2004)	Two Lights (2006)

Singles from The Battle for Everything
- 1. "100 Years" Released: November 24, 2003; 2. "The Devil in the Wishing Well" Released: 2004; 3. "Silent Night" Released: 2004; 4. "If God Made You" Released: 2005

The Battle for Everything is the third studio album by American singer Five for Fighting, released on February 3, 2004 by Aware Records and Columbia Records. Following the success of America Town (2000) and its breakthrough single, "Superman (It's Not Easy)" (2001), John Ondrasik reteamed with producer Gregg Wattenberg and brought in Bill Bottrell to work on new material for his next record. The Battle for Everything debuted at number 20 on the Billboard 200 and spawned four singles: "100 Years", "The Devil in the Wishing Well", "Silent Night", and "If God Made You". The album was certified Platinum by the Recording Industry Association of America (RIAA), denoting sales of over 1,000,000 copies. The album's title refers to the fact "that nothing in the making of this record came easy – including concern over the title itself".

== Background and recording ==
Five for Fighting had achieved a hit record with "Superman (It's Not Easy)" in 2001 leading to his America Town album going Platinum. For the follow-up, Ondrasik went into the studio with record producer Bill Bottrell, best known for his work with Sheryl Crow, in 2003.

On the influences behind Battle and its recording, Ondrasik said, "When I was a kid I could put on Dark Side of the Moon, turn up the sound in my headphones, lie down in the dark, and go away. I wanted that experience again, and so Bill and I were ambitious to the point of absurdity. If we wanted drama, we'd get a thirty-piece orchestra. If we wanted a rock edge, we went after it with reckless abandonment. It was like doing my own private Quadrophenia." The Battle for Everything was released on February 3, 2004.

== Critical reception ==
Professional ratings
Aggregate scores
Source	Rating
Metacritic	47/100
Review scores
Source	Rating
AllMusic	3/5 stars
Alternative Addiction	4/5 stars
Billboard	(favorable)
Blender	1/5 stars
Common Sense Media	4/5 stars
Entertainment Weekly	C+
Melodic	3/5 stars
People	3.5/4 stars
PopMatters	(Mixed)
Rolling Stone	2/5 stars
USA Today	2/4 stars

The Battle for Everything was met with mixed reviews from music critics. At Metacritic, which assigns a normalized rating out of 100 to reviews from mainstream publications, the album received an average score of 47, based on 6 reviews. Rolling Stone critic Christian Hoard said, "On Five for Fighting's third album, Ondrasik's self-pitying ballads overflow with dewy-eyed dreaminess, as his vocals swoon and swoop [...] Piano-based numbers such as "Disneyland" sport strong melodies, but their mush-headed philosophizing push the limits of poetic indulgence." David Browne, writing for Entertainment Weekly, gave the album a C+, saying "...deep down, [Ondrasik] yearns to be a serious artist making grand statements. The band's third CD is weighed down by artificially inflated anthems, garbled lyrics about the apocalypse, and coy attempts at surrealism."

AllMusic gave Battle a mixed review, criticizing Ondrasik's "pompous narcissism" but also saying he had "turned in a very accomplished, professional record that illustrates he has more ambition than such younger peers like John Mayer," that was "more assured and supple than its predecessor."

Billboard's review of the album was positive, saying that the album "impressively tackled new territory". In contrast to other reviews that said the lyrics were overcomplicated, Billboard wrote that Ondrasik had "a knack for writing dead-simple lyrics and turning them into eye-opening reflection". Another favorable review came from People, which selected Battle as a "Critic's Choice" and said it was "a grown-up work rich in melody, lyrical depth and solid musicianship".

J.D. Considine was particularly harsh for Blender. Rating the album one out of five stars, Considine was critical of Ondrasik's attempt at falsetto and considered the album derivative of 1970s soft rock.

== Commercial performance ==
Battle for Everything debuted at number 20 on the Billboard 200 chart in February 2004. Its first single, "100 Years" was another top 40 hit on the Billboard Hot 100 chart. The album was certified Gold in the United States on May 11, 2004 and Platinum on October 19, 2009. It has sold over 958,000 copies in the United States as of November 2009.

== Track listing ==
All songs written by John Ondrasik, except where noted.

No.	Title	Length
1.	"NYC Weather Report" (Ondrasik, Curt Schneider, Andrew Williams)	4:53
2.	"The Devil in the Wishing Well"	3:31
3.	"If God Made You"	4:17
4.	"100 Years"	4:05
5.	"Angels & Girlfriends"	3:29
6.	"Dying"	3:18
7.	"Infidel"	3:33
8.	"Disneyland"	3:53
9.	"Maybe I"	4:30
10.	"The Taste"	3:10
11.	"One More for Love" (Ondrasik, Bill Bottrell, Schneider, Williams)	4:13
12.	"Nobody"	5:10

=== Bonus disc ===
1. "Silent Night" – 3:42
2. "Superman (It's Not Easy)" [Acoustic] – 3:43
3. "Something About You" – 4:01
4. "Sister Sunshine" – 2:58
5. "2 + 2 Makes Five" – 2:41

== Charts ==
=== Weekly charts ===
Chart (2004–2006)	Peak position
Australian Albums (ARIA)	73
Canadian Albums (Nielsen SoundScan)	33
US Billboard 200	20
US Top Catalog Albums (Billboard)	27

=== Year-end charts ===
Chart (2004)	Position
US Billboard 200	118
