= Back Country =

Live album by Five for Fighting
- Released: November 6, 2007
- Genre: Soft rock
- Label: Columbia

Back Country is a live album released by Five for Fighting on November 6, 2007. The album was recorded at a concert in Orlando, where he performed hits like "Superman (It's Not Easy)" and "100 Years".

Back Country is the first live album to be released by Five for Fighting and it comes over a year after the release of Two Lights.

== Track listing ==
=== Disc one ===
1. "Freedom Never Cries"
2. "California Justice"
3. "The Riddle"
4. "65 Mustang"
5. "NYC Weather Report"
6. "Two Lights"
7. "I Just Love You"
8. "If God Made You"
9. "Easy Tonight"
10. "Superman"
11. "100 Years"
12. "Road to Heaven"
13. "Nobody"
14. "Policeman's Xmas Party"

=== Disc two ===
1. "Superman" (music video)
2. "Easy Tonight" (music video)
3. "100 Years" (music video)
4. "The Devil in the Wishing Well" (music video)
5. "The Riddle" (music video)
6. "World" (music video)
7. "Making of "The Devil in the Wishing Well" video"
8. "Making of "The Riddle" video"
9. "Making of the "World" video"
10. ""Two Lights" Dad Interview" (bonus feature)
11. "WhatKindOfWorldDoYouWant.com Charity Videos" (bonus)
12. "Five for Fighting Photo Montage" (bonus)
