= I Know Better =

I Know Better may refer to:

- "I Know Better", a 2016 song by John Legend from Darkness and Light
- "I Know Better", a 2023 song by Matchbox Twenty from Where the Light Goes
