= NHL (disambiguation) =

NHL is the National Hockey League, a professional ice hockey league in North America.

NHL may also refer to:

- NHL (video game series), ice hockey video game series
- NHL Network (disambiguation), several television channels
- NHL Stenden University of Applied Sciences, in the Netherlands
- Nag Hammadi library, a collection of Gnostic texts
- Nakasero Hospital, for-profit hospital in Kampala, Uganda
- National Harmonica League, now HarmonicaUK
- National Heritage Life Insurance Company, based in the United States
- National Historic Landmark, a place designation of the United States government
- National Hurling League, based in Ireland
- Natural hydraulic lime, produced by heating limestone
- New Holland railway station, station code NHL in England
- Non-Hodgkin lymphoma, a subgroup of cancers
- Smt. NHL Municipal Medical College, in India
- New Haven Line, a rail line in New York and Connecticut, United States
