= Don't Trust Me (disambiguation) =

"Don't Trust Me" is a 2008 song by American duo 3OH!3.

Don't Trust Me may also refer to:

== Other songs ==
- "Don't Trust Me", by Phillip Phillips from Behind the Light, 2014
- "Don't Trust Me", by Tyler Parkford, 2013
- "Don't Trust Me", on the You Are Wanted soundtrack, 2017

== Other works ==
- Don't Trust Me, a 2008 solo exhibition by artist Adel Abdessemed
- "Don't Trust Me", a 2010 10 Things I Hate About You episode
- Don't Trust Me, a 2025 album by EBK Jaaybo
