= Don't Get Me Wrong (Matchbox Twenty song) =

2023 single by Matchbox Twenty

Single by Matchbox Twenty

from the album Where the Light Goes
- Released: May 5, 2023
- Recorded: 2022
- Length: 2:53
- Label: Atlantic
- Songwriters: Rob Thomas; David Garcia; Craig Wiseman
- Producer: Gregg Wattenberg

Matchbox Twenty singles chronology
"Wild Dogs (Running in a Slow Dream)" (2023)	"Don't Get Me Wrong" (2023)

"Don't Get Me Wrong" is a song by American alternative rock band Matchbox Twenty. It was released on May 5, 2023, as the second single from their fifth studio album Where the Light Goes.

== Background ==
"Don't Get Me Wrong" was one of the few Matchbox Twenty songs that Thomas wrote with outside writers. Originally written for another potential solo album, the band chose the song as a song they wanted to record even prior to the band wanting to record a full-length album. According to Thomas, the song is about how people who have been together can have an argument where the relationship can feel in jeopardy, but ultimately "this song was just someone saying, 'I know I get mad sometimes, but I'm not going anywhere'".

== Charts ==
Chart performance for "Don't Get Me Wrong"
Chart (2023)	Peak position
Czech Republic Rock (IFPI)	20
Slovakia Airplay (ČNS IFPI)	85
US Adult Pop Airplay (Billboard)	17
