= Fly (Phillip Phillips song) =

2014 song by Phillip Phillips

Promotional single by Phillip Phillips

from the album Behind the Light
- Released: April 22, 2014
- Recorded: New York City
- Genre: Alternative rock, pop rock
- Length: 4:54
- Label: Interscope
- Songwriters: Phillip Phillips, Todd Clark
- Producer: Todd Clark

"Fly" is a song by American singer-songwriter Phillip Phillips from his second studio album, Behind the Light, released by Interscope Records.

== Background ==
"Fly" was recorded in New York City and was produced by Todd Clark.

== Lyrical interpretation ==
MUSICInsideU states that "Fly" is about the conflict between who people think Phillip Phillips is and try to tie him down to, and who he really is. "These people never notice me. Am I the only one who thinks it's hard?" Phillips breaks other people's categories of him, mixing rock guitar solos with his typical acoustic sound. His almost country-style voice also blends with darker rock lyrics in the single "Fly". He added, "The meaning of Phillip Phillips' 'Fly' is about who he is; applied to you, it's about who you are." Outside, there is "the busy street... these people never notice me." "I don't fit in," says Phillips; "it's hard to say what's on my mind." The questions raised are "give up? How should I survive?" A part of him feels like just giving in and blending into the "two thousand faces" of the crowd. A deeper part of Phillips rebels against being like everyone else. "Think your fight is over? It's only so much closer." Phillips will not give up breaking out of the walls of this "cruel maze" of a nameless society: "I reach my hands to the sky... and fly!"

== Release and reception ==
The song was released on April 22, 2014, the same time when "Behind the Light" was ready for pre-order.

=== Critical reception ===
Early acclaim came from Direct Lyrics, who says "Fly" is being praised by fans on Twitter. Notably highlighting the song's guitar solos, epic drums, and Phillip's passionate vocals. No doubt 'Fly' is such an intense record! "I feel it's hard to say what's on my mind", sings the winner of American Idol season 11 in the chorus of the song. Yes Phillip! I like." John Frahm of Yahoo! Voices gave the song a positive review, "In "Fly", Phillips makes the transition deeper into the Alternative rock scene rather effortlessly, definitely never sacrificing the tremendous instrumentals that we've come to know him as an arranger for and most definitely never sacrificing a thing when it comes to his hugely brooding, idiosyncratic voice and style. He added, "Phillip Phillips has never quite rocked out up to this point in the way that he does on "Fly", and he does so so very well. In saying that this track won't necessarily be the immediate radio hit that "Raging Fire" was, I don't meant that it's impossible for it to sell on the market should it ever be released for adds. It's quite the contrary, really; though Phillips' core audience may need a bit of time to lean into the heavier rock and roll atmosphere that he's set up for us in this track, it maintains the structure of positively infectious past hits very well—just with much more of a raw swagger to be taken along with it. He's produced something both unexpected and brilliant, ushering in an era of purer rock music that hasn't been heard from a mainstream artist in as genuine a way as he is able to bring about in a long, long while. It's the type of rock-heavy song that could do especially well as the leading track on a movie soundtrack!"

== Release history ==
Country	Date	Format	Label
United States	April 22, 2014	Digital download, Promotional single	Interscope Records

== Chart positions ==
Chart (2014)	Peak position
South Korea (Gaon International Chart)	119
