= List of Billboard Adult Contemporary number ones of 2004 =

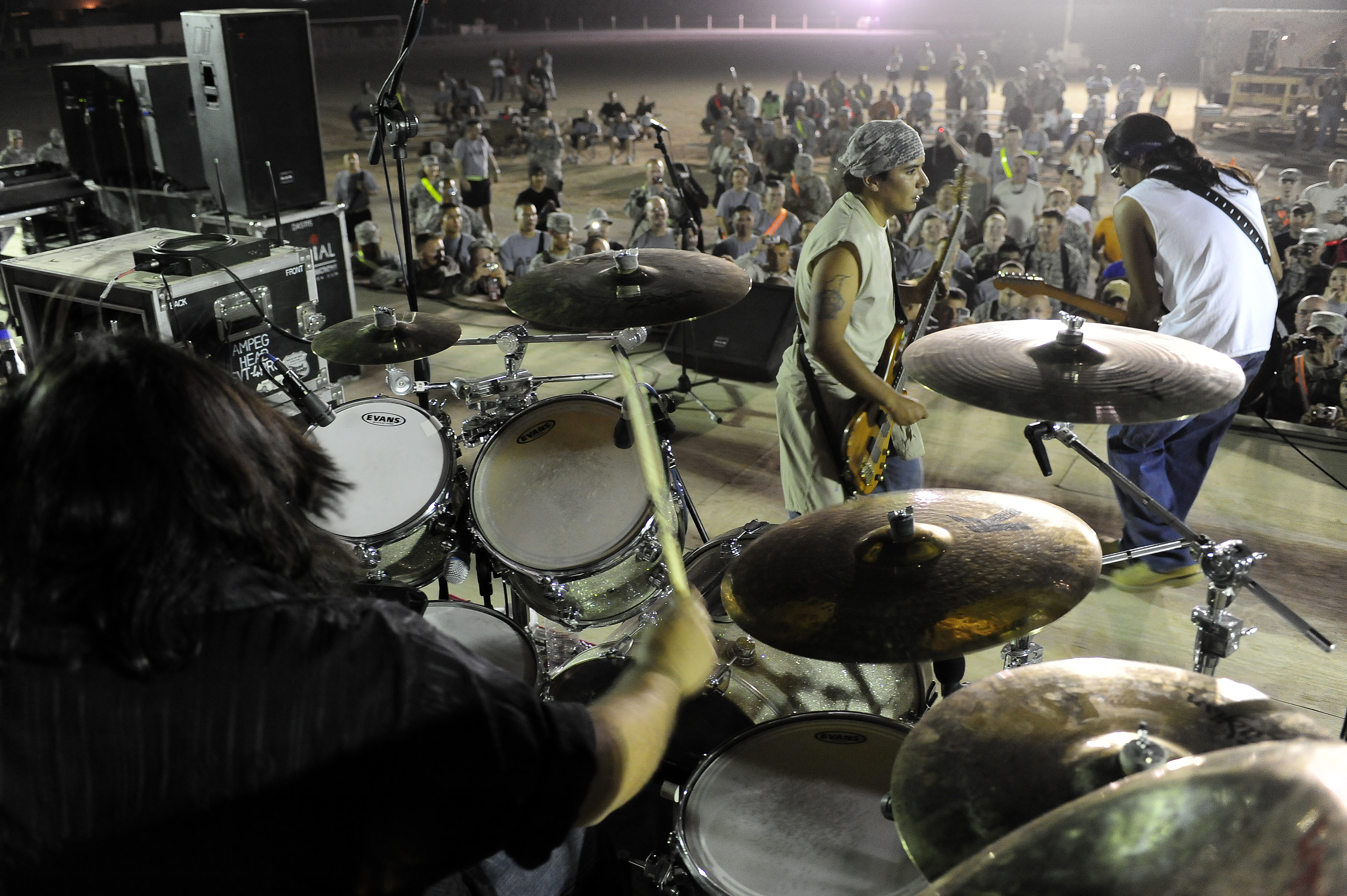
Los Lonely Boys topped the chart for 10 weeks in 2004 with "Heaven".

Adult Contemporary is a chart published by Billboard ranking the top-performing songs in the United States in the adult contemporary music (AC) market. In 2004, ten different songs topped the chart in 52 issues of the magazine, based on weekly airplay data from radio stations compiled by Nielsen Broadcast Data Systems.

In the first issue of Billboard of the new year, the number one song was "Sending You a Little Christmas" by pianist Jim Brickman with vocals by Kristy Starling, which moved into the top spot that week. It spent a single week at number one before being displaced by "Drift Away" by Uncle Kracker featuring Dobie Gray. Having already spent a lengthy run at number one in 2003, the song ultimately achieved a total of 28 weeks in the top spot, a new record for the AC chart. The longest run at number one in 2004 was achieved by "Heaven" by Chicano rock group Los Lonely Boys, which spent ten consecutive weeks atop the chart. The song with the highest total number of weeks at number one, however, was "100 Years" by John Ondrasik, known under the stage name Five for Fighting, which spent twelve non-consecutive weeks in the top spot.

The only act to have more than one number one in 2004 was singer Josh Groban. He first topped the chart for four weeks in March and April with his version of the Secret Garden song "You Raise Me Up", which he had performed at Super Bowl XXXVIII in February, in a special NASA commemoration for the previous year's Space Shuttle Columbia disaster, as well as on a special edition of Oprah Winfrey's TV show. He returned to number one in December with "Believe", taken from the soundtrack of the animated film The Polar Express, which was the final chart-topper of the year. Although "Believe" received a Grammy Award for Best Song Written for a Motion Picture, Television or Other Visual Media, was nominated for an Academy Award for Best Original Song, and topped the Adult Contemporary chart, it did not enter Billboard's all-genre chart, the Hot 100, at all. None of 2004's AC number ones topped the Hot 100; the top of the all-genre chart was dominated during the year by R&B and hip hop acts such as Usher and Outkast.

== Chart history ==
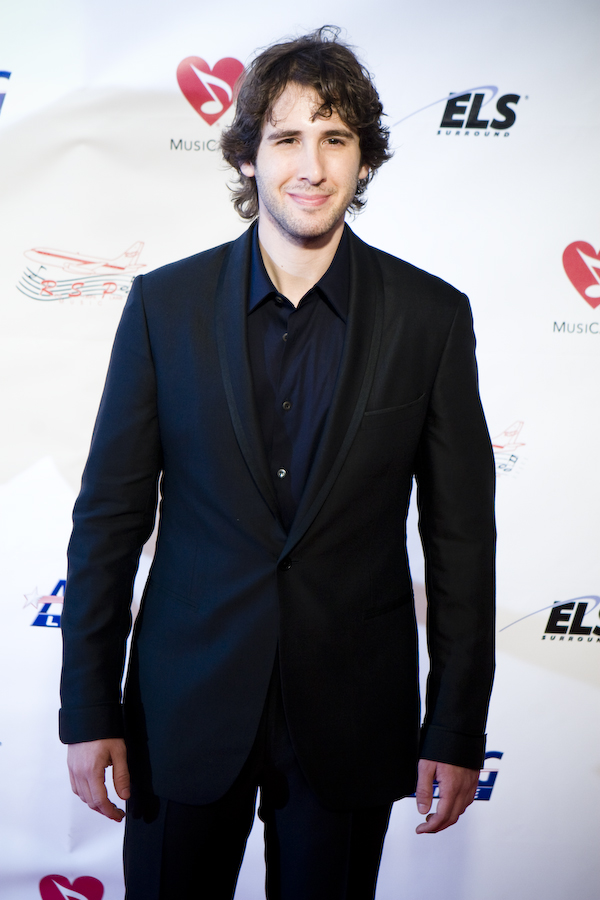
Josh Groban topped the chart with "You Raise Me Up", which he performed at Super Bowl XXXVIII.

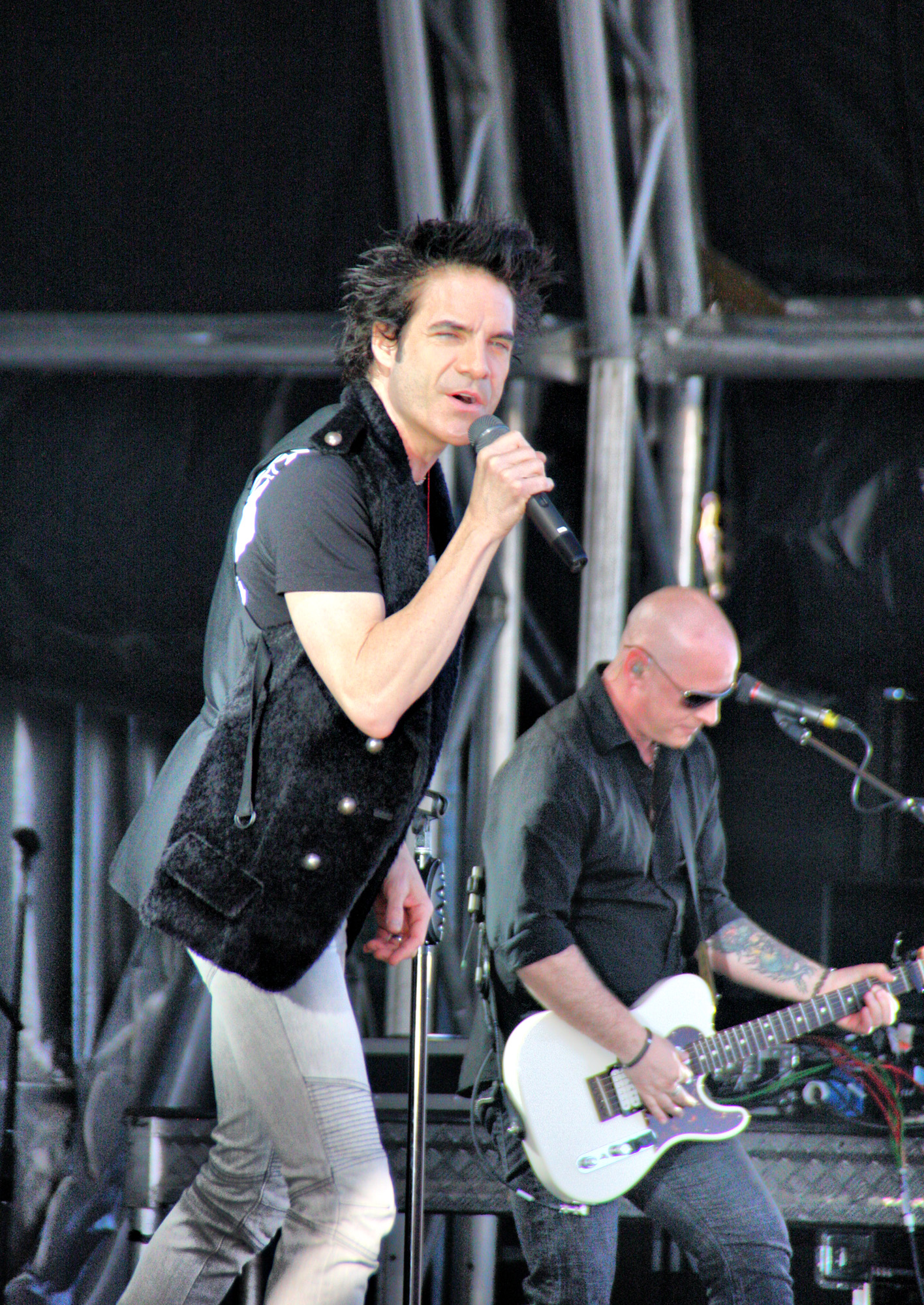
American rock band Train spent three weeks at number one with their song "Calling All Angels".

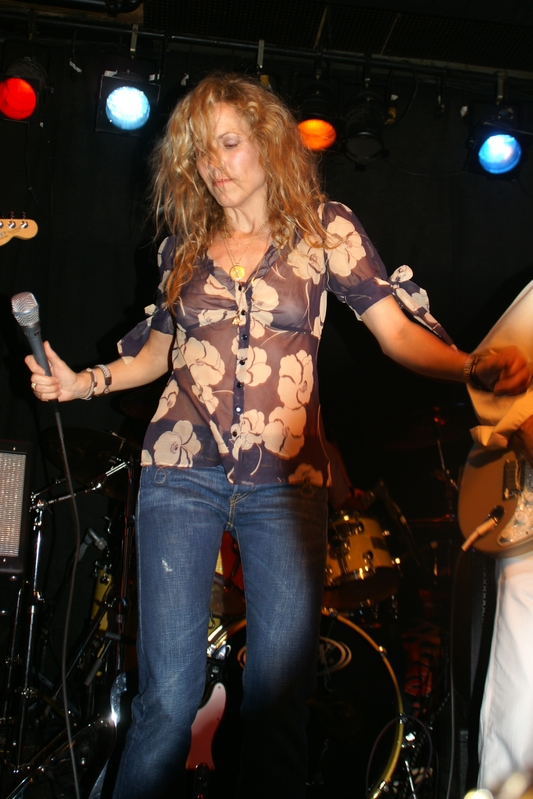
Sheryl Crow topped the chart with her version of "The First Cut Is the Deepest".

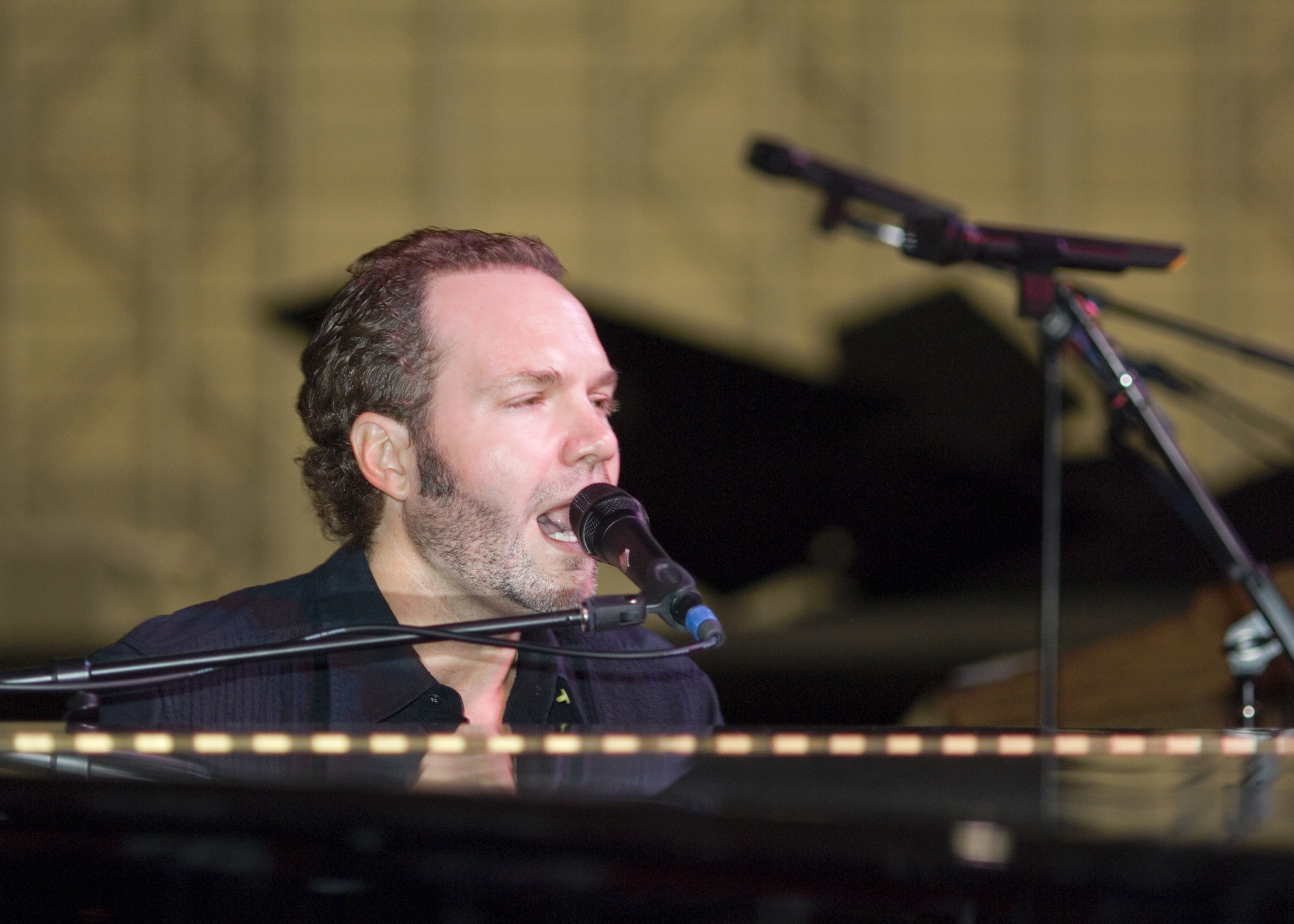
American singer Five For Fighting spent 12 weeks at number one with his song "100 Years".

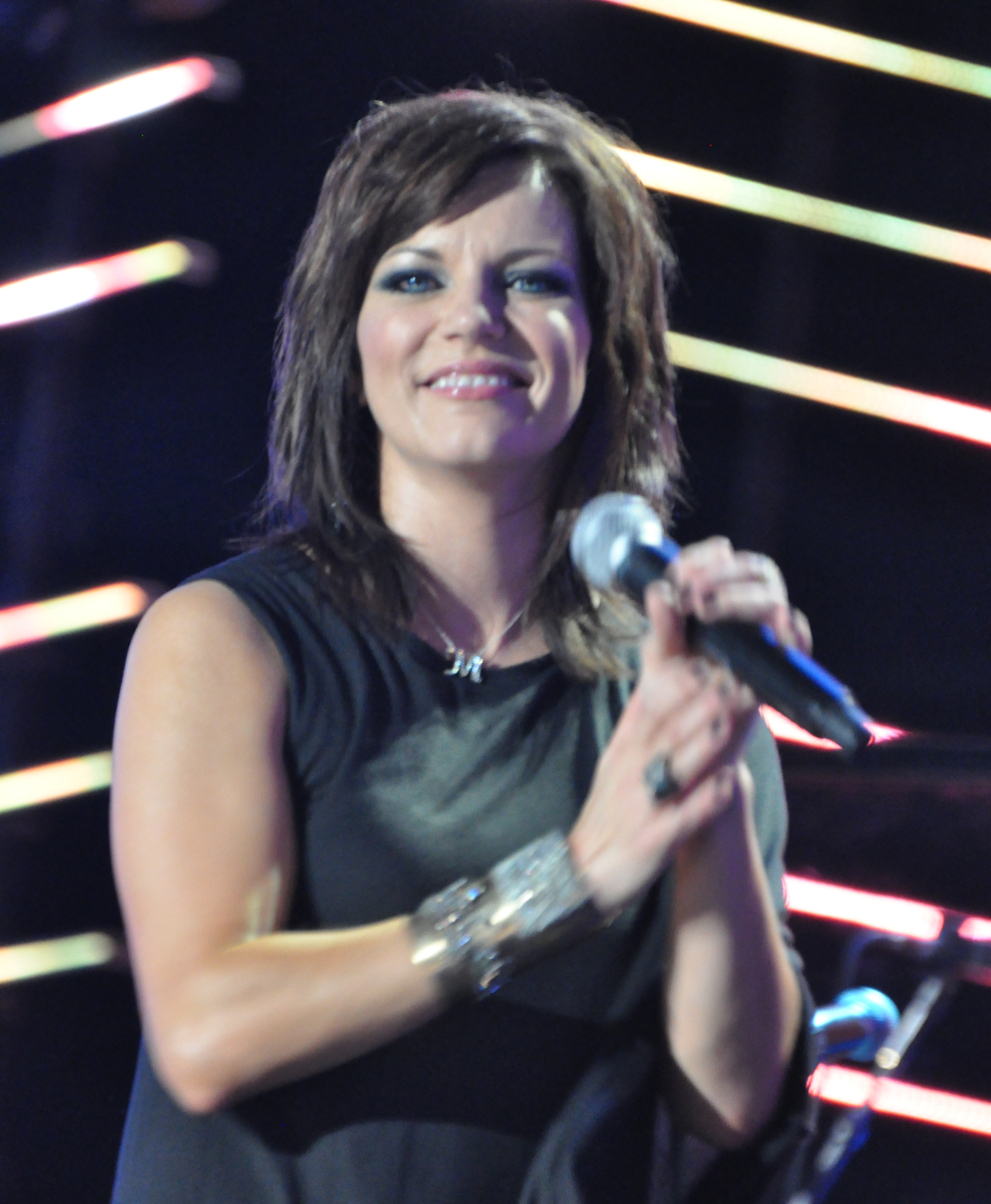
"This One's for the Girls" was a number one for country singer Martina McBride.

Key
Billboard ranked "White Flag" by Dido as the best-performing AC song of 2004, though it never reached the top position.

Issue date	Title	Artist(s)	Ref.
January 3	"Sending You a Little Christmas"	Jim Brickman with Kristy Starling	
January 10	"Drift Away"	Uncle Kracker featuring Dobie Gray	
January 17	"Drift Away"	Uncle Kracker featuring Dobie Gray	
January 24	"Calling All Angels"	Train	
January 31	"Drift Away"	Uncle Kracker featuring Dobie Gray	
February 7	"Calling All Angels"	Train	
February 14	"Forever and for Always"	Shania Twain	
February 21	"Calling All Angels"	Train	
February 28	"Forever and for Always"	Shania Twain	
March 6	"Forever and for Always"	Shania Twain	
March 13	"You Raise Me Up"	Josh Groban	
March 20	"You Raise Me Up"	Josh Groban	
March 27	"You Raise Me Up"	Josh Groban	
April 3	"You Raise Me Up"	Josh Groban	
April 10	"The First Cut Is the Deepest"	Sheryl Crow	
April 17	"You Raise Me Up"	Josh Groban	
April 24	"You Raise Me Up"	Josh Groban	
May 1	"The First Cut Is the Deepest"	Sheryl Crow	
May 8	"100 Years"	Five for Fighting	
May 15	"100 Years"	Five for Fighting	
May 22	"100 Years"	Five for Fighting	
May 29	"100 Years"	Five for Fighting	
June 5	"100 Years"	Five for Fighting	
June 12	"100 Years"	Five for Fighting	
June 19	"100 Years"	Five for Fighting	
June 26	"100 Years"	Five for Fighting	
July 3	"This One's for the Girls"	Martina McBride	
July 10	"This One's for the Girls"	Martina McBride	
July 17	"100 Years"	Five for Fighting	
July 24	"100 Years"	Five for Fighting	
July 31	"100 Years"	Five for Fighting	
August 7	"This One's for the Girls"	Martina McBride	
August 14	"This One's for the Girls"	Martina McBride	
August 21	"This One's for the Girls"	Martina McBride	
August 28	"This One's for the Girls"	Martina McBride	
September 4	"This One's for the Girls"	Martina McBride	
September 11	"This One's for the Girls"	Martina McBride	
September 18	"100 Years"	Five for Fighting	
September 25	"This One's for the Girls"	Martina McBride	
October 2	"Heaven"	Los Lonely Boys	
October 9	"Heaven"	Los Lonely Boys	
October 16	"Heaven"	Los Lonely Boys	
October 23	"Heaven"	Los Lonely Boys	
October 30	"Heaven"	Los Lonely Boys	
November 6	"Heaven"	Los Lonely Boys	
November 13	"Heaven"	Los Lonely Boys	
November 20	"Heaven"	Los Lonely Boys	
November 27	"Heaven"	Los Lonely Boys	
December 4	"Heaven"	Los Lonely Boys	
December 11	"Believe"	Josh Groban	
December 18	"Believe"	Josh Groban	
December 25	"Believe"	Josh Groban	

== See also ==
- 2004 in music
- List of artists who reached number one on the U.S. Adult Contemporary chart
