= Easy Tonight =

2000 single by Five for Fighting

Single by Five for Fighting

from the album America Town
- Released: September 18, 2000
- Length: 4:08
- Label: Columbia; Aware
- Songwriter: John Ondrasik
- Producer: Gregg Wattenberg

Five for Fighting singles chronology
"Easy Tonight" (2000)	"Superman (It's Not Easy)" (2001)
"Superman (It's Not Easy)" (2001)	"Easy Tonight" (2002)	"America Town" (2002)

"Easy Tonight" is a song by American singer-songwriter Five for Fighting. It was released as his debut single in September 2000, serving as the lead single from his second album, America Town. It was re-released in March 2002 after the success of the album's second single, "Superman (It's Not Easy)". The song topped the US Billboard Triple-A chart in January 2001 and also charted in the Netherlands and New Zealand, entering the top 20 in the latter country.

== Music video ==
The music video was directed by Nancy Bardawil and produced by Michael Pierce. It premiered on MTV, VH1 and MTV2 in March 2002.

== Charts ==
=== Weekly charts ===
Weekly chart performance for "Easy Tonight"
Chart (2001–2002)	Peak position
Netherlands (Single Top 100)	88
New Zealand (Recorded Music NZ)	20
US Adult Alternative Airplay (Billboard)	1
US Adult Pop Airplay (Billboard)	18

=== Year-end charts ===
Year-end chart performance for "Easy Tonight"
Chart (2001)	Position
US Adult Top 40 (Billboard)	71
US Triple-A (Billboard)	21

== Release history ==
Region	Date	Format(s)	Label(s)	Ref.
United States	September 18, 2000	Rock radio	Columbia; Aware	
United States	November 21, 2000	Mainstream rock; active rock; alternative radio	Columbia; Aware	
United States	December 4, 2000	Adult contemporary; hot adult contemporary radio	Columbia; Aware	
United States (re-release)	March 4, 2002	Hot adult contemporary radio	Columbia; Aware	
Australia	July 29, 2002	CD	Columbia; Aware	
