= Back country =

Back country may refer to:

- Backcountry, a remote, isolated, undeveloped geographic area
- Back Country, a live CD/DVD released by Five for Fighting
