= Bookmarks (album) =

Studio album by Five for Fighting
- Released: September 17, 2013
- Recorded: 2011–13
- Genre: Pop rock
- Length: 37:44
- Label: Wind-up
- Producer: Derek Fuhrmann; Gregg Wattenberg

Five for Fighting chronology
Slice (2009)	Bookmarks (2013)

Singles from Bookmarks
- 1. "What If" Released: June 11, 2013

Bookmarks is the sixth studio album by American singer Five for Fighting. It was released on September 17, 2013, by Wind-up Records. The album's first single, "What If", was released on June 11, 2013.

== Background ==
After his previous album Slice was released in 2009, Ondrasik was uncertain about his future music career. He decided to record Bookmarks after restoring his passion for music while training for a marathon.

== Recording ==
Bookmarks was produced by Derek Fuhrmann and Gregg Wattenberg. Wattenberg previously worked with American rock band Train and American Idol season 11 winner Phillip Phillips. Ondrasik and Wattenberg previously worked together for Ondrasik's 2000 album America Town. While recording, both of them tried out various genres and drum rhythms. Almost 60 songs were recorded for Bookmarks including six versions of "You'll Never Change".

== Composition ==
Ondrasik based the songs off of Bookmarks on his life experiences that occurred in the three years after Slice.

== Reception ==
Professional ratings
Review scores
Source	Rating
AllMusic	4/5 stars

Stephen Thomas Erlewine of AllMusic said that while Bookmarks sounded like early 2000s adult contemporary, he praised the positive lyrics and believed Bookmarks was the most put together album by Five for Fighting.

== Track listing ==
No.	Title	Length
1.	"Stand Up"	2:51
2.	"What If"	3:27
3.	"Heaven Knows"	3:30
4.	"Down"	3:29
5.	"I Don't Want Your Love"	3:34
6.	"Road To You"	2:51
7.	"She's My Girl"	3:26
8.	"Symphony Lane"	3:39
9.	"You'll Never Change"	3:13
10.	"Your Man"	3:28
11.	"The Day I Died"	4:16
12.	"Rebel" (bonus track)	3:09

== Charts ==
Chart (2013)	Peak position
US Billboard 200	54
