= Backcountry (disambiguation) =

In geography, a backcountry is a geographical area that is remote or difficult to access.

Backcountry or Back Country may also refer to:

- Backcountry (historical region), in 18th-century North America, the area west of the Appalachians
- Backcountry (film), a 2014 Canadian film
- Backcountry.com an online retailer of outdoor clothing and equipment
- Backcountry skiing, skiing in wilderness areas
- Backcountry Super Cubs, an American aircraft manufacturer
- Back Country, a 2007 album by Five for Fighting

== See also ==
- Frontier
- Outback
- Frontcountry
- Slackcountry
