= Wild Dogs (Running in a Slow Dream) =

2023 single by Matchbox Twenty

"Wild Dogs (Running In a Slow Dream)"

Single by Matchbox Twenty

from the album Where the Light Goes
- Released: March 17, 2023
- Recorded: 2022
- Length: 3:30
- Label: Atlantic
- Songwriters: Rob Thomas; Gregg Wattenberg; Paul Doucette
- Producers: Gregg Wattenberg; Paul Doucette

Matchbox Twenty singles chronology
"Our Song" (2013)	"Wild Dogs (Running In a Slow Dream)" (2023)	"Don't Get Me Wrong" (2023)

Music video
- "Wild Dogs (Running in a Slow Dream)" on YouTube

"Wild Dogs (Running in a Slow Dream)" is a song by the American alternative rock band Matchbox Twenty. It was released on March 17, 2023, as the first single from their fifth studio album Where the Light Goes (2023). The single was the first new material from the band since 2012.

== Charts ==
Chart performance for "Wild Dogs (Running in a Slow Dream)"
Chart (2023)	Peak position
Slovakia Airplay (ČNS IFPI)	86
US Adult Contemporary (Billboard)	24
US Adult Pop Airplay (Billboard)	22
