= Slice (album) =

Studio album by Five for Fighting
- Released: October 13, 2009
- Recorded: 2009
- Genre: Soft rock
- Length: 40:19
- Label: Aware; Wind-up
- Producer: Five for Fighting; Gregg Wattenberg

Five for Fighting chronology
Two Lights (2006)	Slice (2009)	Bookmarks (2013)

Singles from Slice
- 1. "Chances" Released: July 21, 2009; 2. "Slice" Released: July 12, 2010

Professional ratings
Review scores
Source	Rating
AbsolutePunk	(82%)
AllMusic	3.5/5 stars
Alternative Addiction	3/5 stars
Melodic	3.5/5 stars
Sputnikmusic	(2.5/5)

Slice is the fifth studio album by American singer Five for Fighting, released on October 13, 2009 by Aware Records and Wind-up Records. In May 2009, Ondrasik posted on his Myspace blog that the name of his forthcoming record will be taken from fan suggestions, and will be subsequently voted on to determine the winning album title.

The first single from the new album, called "Chances", was released on July 21, 2009, as a digital download. It also debuted on the Billboard Hot 100 chart at number 83 and at number 12 on the Billboard Adult Contemporary chart on the week ending October 31, 2009. "Chances" can also be heard in the end credits of the 2009 film, The Blind Side. It can also be heard in the first promotional commercial video of Idol in season 10.

Slice has sold approximately 30,000 during its stay on the Billboard 200 chart.

On September 22, 2009, the music video for "Chances" was released on VH1.com. The music video shows the story of two teenagers falling in love, while Ondrasik narrates the story. The music video was directed by Steven Drypolcher and produced by Partizan. David Campbell arranged the strings for "Chances", "Slice", and "Story".

== Track listing ==
No.	Title	Length
1.	"Slice"	3:34
2.	"Note To An Unknown Soldier"	3:27
3.	"Tuesday"	3:29
4.	"Chances"	3:35
5.	"This Dance"	3:51
6.	"Above the Timberline"	3:24
7.	"Transfer"	4:06
8.	"Hope"	4:01
9.	"Story of Your Life"	3:29
10.	"Love Can't Change the Weather"	3:54
11.	"Augie Nieto"	3:29

== Charts ==
Chart performance
Chart (2009)	Peak position
Canadian Albums (Nielsen SoundScan)	95
US Billboard 200	34
US Top Rock Albums (Billboard)	15
