= Call + Response =

2008 film

- Directed by: Justin Dillon
- Starring: Cornel West; Madeleine Albright; Daryl Hannah; Julia Ormond; Ashley Judd; Nicholas D. Kristof; Gary Haugen; Kevin Bales; David Batstone; John Miller
- Music by: Moby; Natasha Bedingfield; Cold War Kids; Matisyahu; Imogen Heap; Talib Kweli; Five For Fighting; Switchfoot; Nickel Creek; Rocco Deluca; Emmanuel Jal
- Release date: October 10, 2008
- Running time: 86 minutes
- Country: United States
- Language: English

Call + Response is a documentary film released in 2008 by Fair Trade Pictures to support human rights activism against human trafficking and slavery on a community level. The film was Justin Dillon's directorial debut. This is the final film that Don LaFontaine voiced the trailers for. The movie was released a month after his death.

== Details ==
The film explores the 21st century slave trade industry and offers firsthand accounts on the issue from Cornel West, Madeleine Albright, Daryl Hannah, Julia Ormond, Ashley Judd, Nicholas D. Kristof, and many other prominent political and cultural figures. The film also includes musical performances from Moby, Natasha Bedingfield, Cold War Kids, Matisyahu, Imogen Heap, Emmanuel Jal, Talib Kweli, The Scrolls, Five For Fighting, Switchfoot, Rocco Deluca, and Justin Dillon.

Call + Response led to the formation of Fair Trade Fund, Inc., d.b.a. Made In A Free World, a non-profit organization dedicated to ending modern-day slavery. All profits from Call + Response, such as from sales of the DVD, soundtrack, and iTunes downloads, are used to support Made In A Free World's projects, aimed at disrupting the business of slavery, particularly child slavery and forced labor.
