= Message for Albert =

Studio album by Five for Fighting
- Released: March 11, 1997
- Genres: Rock; pop rock
- Length: 48:23
- Labels: Nettwerk; EMI

Five for Fighting chronology
Message for Albert (1997)	America Town (2000)

Professional ratings
Review scores
Source	Rating
AllMusic	3/5 stars
Melodic	2/5 stars

Message for Albert is the debut studio album by American singer Five for Fighting, released on March 11, 1997 by Nettwerk and EMI.

== Background ==
John Ondrasik had signed with EMI Records in 1995 and adopted Five for Fighting as his "band name" despite being a solo act. EMI executives believed that the male singer songwriter persona was no longer viable, so Ondrasik selected Five for Fighting as a stage name.

== Lyrics and Composition ==
Ondrasik wrote or co-wrote all of the album's songs. Mark Hermann co-wrote "Happy," "Wise Man," and "2 Frogs."

Message is unique among Five for Fighting albums in that several of its songs focus on named characters (rather than being strictly first-person ballads). "Bella's Birthday Cake" tells of an older woman who tries to seduce the narrator. The Garden's lyrics focus on a religious seeker named Johnny. "Happy" is about a character named Daddy (or Big Daddy, as he appears in the CD jacket). "2 Frogs" is told from the perspective of an anthropomorphic, storytelling frog. "The Last Great American" is about a man named Mr. Merry, who is so disgusted with the United States' lack of spirit that he buries himself alive. The hidden track "European B-Side" summarizes and explains some of these characters, saying that "Mr. Merry's in the garden / trying to tie his high-top shoes / Johnny's off on daff-dill mountain / praying for the news...Bella's taking ludes / Daddy's off without a pardon / But nothing left to lose."

Some rare versions of the album released in Japan feature two additional songs: "Big Cities" and "Do You Mind." The latter song was later used as the hidden track on America Town.

== Collapse of EMI Records and aftermath ==
Message for Albert was released in March 1997. In June 1997, EMI Records closed its American division. No singles were released from the album, although "Bella's Birthday Cake" was featured in several indie compilation albums from 1996-1998. In the immediate aftermath of EMI America's collapse, Ondrasik tried to have the album re-released through Capitol Records or Virgin Records, but was not successful. Only after the success of America Town did Capitol re-release Message for Albert.

Two songs from Message, "Love Song" and "The Last Great American," were re-recorded and included on Five for Fighting's 2000 album America Town. "Bella's Birthday Cake" was also featured in 2011's The Very Best of Five for Fighting compilation, the only song from Message to be included.

In the 2010s and onward, Ondrasik frequently performed songs from Message for Albert in his string quartet and orchestral shows, such as "Ocean" and "White Picket Fence". For Ondrasik's rock-based shows, "Bella's Birthday Cake" was used as the opening song during Five for Fighting's 2022 summer tour.

== Critical reception ==
AllMusic compared the sounds of Five for Fighting's debut to Billy Joel, Ben Folds, and Steely Dan, calling Message for Albert "intelligent and well-crafted." The review praised Ondrasik's "uncanny ability to take beautiful melodies like the simple piano phrasing of 'Day By Day' and weave them into stunning, multi-layered vocal arrangements replete with gorgeous string crescendos, each playing off each other like a well-oiled machine...a promising debut that sadly lost its shot when EMI spontaneously combusted after the record's release."

== Track listing ==
No.	Title	Length
1.	"Bella's Birthday Cake"	4:19
2.	"Day by Day"	2:56
3.	"The Garden"	3:48
4.	"Ocean"	5:32
5.	"Happy"	3:09
6.	"Love Song"	4:37
7.	"Wise Man"	5:41
8.	"White Picket Fence"	3:10
9.	"2 Frogs"	5:15
10.	"10 Miles from Nowhere"	3:03
11.	"Last Great American"	3:06
12.	"European B-side"	3:47

Bonus Tracks (Japan Release):

1. "Big Cities"
2. "Do You Mind"
