= Slice (song) =

Single by Five for Fighting

from the album Slice
- Released: July 12, 2010
- Recorded: 2009
- Genre: Alternative rock; soft rock; pop rock
- Length: 3:35
- Label: Aware; Columbia
- Songwriter(s): Gregg Wattenberg; John Ondrasik
- Producer(s): Gregg Wattenberg

Five for Fighting singles chronology
"Chances" (2009)	"Slice" (2010)	"What If" (2013)

"Slice" is the title track and the second single from Five for Fighting's 2009 album of the same name.

The song is a nostalgic tribute to Don McLean's "American Pie", featuring a reference to "Chevys and levees" in the first verse and the line "We were more than just a slice of American pie" in the chorus. It is performed in the key of B major with a tempo of 126 beats per minuete in common time. The song follows a chord progression of F♯/A♯–B–E6/9, and Ondrasik's vocals span from D♯_{4} to B_{5}.

== Chart performance ==
"Slice" peaked at number 33 on the US Adult Pop Songs chart and number 11 on the US Adult Contemporary chart.

=== Charts ===
Chart (2010–11)	Peak position
US Adult Pop Airplay (Billboard)	33
US Adult Contemporary (Billboard)	11

=== Year-end charts ===
Chart (2010)	Position
US Adult Contemporary (Billboard)	34
Chart (2011)	Position
US Adult Contemporary (Billboard)	48
