= Chances (Five for Fighting song) =

2009 single by Five for Fighting

Single by Five for Fighting

from the album Slice
- Released: July 21, 2009 (official U.S. release); March 28, 2010 (Philippine reissue)
- Recorded: 2009
- Genre: Soft rock; heartland rock; pop rock
- Length: 3:35
- Label: Aware; Wind-up
- Songwriters: Gregg Wattenberg; John Ondrasik
- Producer: Gregg Wattenberg

Five for Fighting singles chronology
"I Just Love You" (2007)	"Chances" (00000001)	"Slice" (2010)

Music video
- "Chances" on YouTube

"Chances" is a song written by Gregg Wattenberg and John Ondrasik, and recorded by Ondrasik under his stage name Five for Fighting. The song was released on July 21, 2009, as the first single from the band's 2009 album Slice. The song was the band's fourth and last single to chart on the Billboard Hot 100 chart. "Chances" is the second track of the official Superleague Formula soundtrack A Beautiful Race: The Superleague Formula album, which was re-released from Sony Music Entertainment Philippines on April 4, 2010. It was also featured in the end credits to The Blind Side, the end montage of scenes in The Vampire Diaries season one, episode 10, "The Turning Point" and in promos for professional wrestler Shawn Michaels' induction into the WWE Hall of Fame of 2011.

== Music video ==
A music video was shot for the song, which was directed by Steven Drypolcher. The music video shows the story of two teenagers falling in love.

The video was filmed at Singing Springs Movie ranch a week before the Station Fire burned 250 square miles in the Angeles National Forest. All structures and vegetation seen in the video were destroyed. The player piano was rented and carried up and down a flight of stairs.

== Chart performance ==
"Chances" debuted at number 83 on the Billboard Hot 100 chart for the chart week of October 21, 2009. The next week, the song fell off the chart completely and failed to re-enter the Hot 100 chart. The song was released to adult radio formats in 2009, reaching the top 10 on Billboard's Adult Contemporary chart after spending 24 weeks on the chart.

=== Charts ===
Chart (2009–10)	Peak position
US Billboard Hot 100	83
US Adult Pop Songs	14
US Adult Contemporary	8

=== Year-end charts ===
Chart (2009)	Position
US Adult Contemporary (Billboard)	39
US Adult Top 40 (Billboard)	50
Chart (2010)	Position
US Adult Contemporary (Billboard)	20

== Release history ==
Country	Date
United States	July 21, 2009
