= World (Five for Fighting song) =

Single by Five for Fighting

from the album Two Lights
- Released: November 13, 2006
- Recorded: 2006
- Genre: Soft rock; pop rock
- Length: 3:52
- Label: Aware; Columbia
- Songwriter(s): John Ondrasik
- Producer(s): Curt Schneider

Five for Fighting singles chronology
"The Riddle" (2006)	"World" (2006)	"I Just Love You" (2007)

"World" is a song written and recorded by American singer Five for Fighting. It was released in November 2006 as the second single from the album Two Lights. It reached number 14 on the U.S. Billboard Adult Pop Songs chart.

== Content ==
"World" is an upbeat, piano-driven melody that, like his other singles, paints vivid pictures of human life driven with deep emotion. The song's lyrics are notably more cryptic than in previous singles, but are driven by the chorus hooks, "What kind of world do you want?" and "Be careful what you wish for, history starts now."

== Critical reception ==
Chuck Taylor, of Billboard magazine reviewed the song favorably, calling the song "admittedly more abstract" but the average listener will pick out certain lines and find a relatable message. He goes on to say that "alongside, the piano-driven, orchestrated melody is his most captivating yet lush and instantly memorable."

== Music video ==
The music video for "World" features aspects of the bright side of life including children, marriage and fireworks. There are also references that go with the lyrics including a brief image of a mushroom cloud in a cup of coffee, with a newspaper's headline featuring North Korea's nuclear program. It was directed by Todd Strauss-Schulson.

== Licensed appearances ==
A separate music video for the song was made by the U.S. television network CBS to promote their drama Jericho. The video consisted of scenes from the first half of the season edited together.

The song has also been used on The History Channel in a promotional montage for the network.

PBS also used the song during the first episode of the documentary series Carrier.

This song has appeared in a commercial for Sears, featuring rapper LL Cool J, actress and singer Vanessa Hudgens of High School Musical, and Ty Pennington of Extreme Makeover: Home Edition. World has also been used by Autism Speaks, and several other group supporters, as a theme to promote awareness for autism spectrum disorder (ASD). The song has been featured in the organization's video's as well as several fan made video's promoting the cause.

== Chart performance ==
=== Weekly charts ===
Chart (2006–07)	Position
US Billboard Adult Pop Songs	14

=== Year-end charts ===
Chart (2007)	Position
US Adult Top 40 (Billboard)	38
