= The Riddle (Five for Fighting song) =

2006 single by Five for Fighting

Single by Five for Fighting

from the album Two Lights
- Released: May 15, 2006
- Genre: Pop rock; soft rock
- Length: 3:48
- Label: Aware; Columbia
- Songwriter(s): John Ondrasik
- Producer(s): Curt Schneider

Five for Fighting singles chronology
"If God Made You" (2005)	"The Riddle" (2006)	"World" (2006)

"The Riddle" is a song by American singer Five for Fighting. It was released on May 15, 2006, as the lead single from his fourth album Two Lights. The song peaked at number 40 on the Billboard Hot 100 chart during an 18-week chart stay, making it Five for Fighting's third and, to date, last top-40 hit in the United States. On the Billboard Adult Contemporary chart, the single reached number four.

== Background and content ==
John Ondrasik has stated that it was the hardest to write of any of his songs, taking 18 months to write. By the end, he had over 100 drafts before he came up with the final version. Although it began as a song on the meaning of life, it later evolved into a song about the love between a father and his son, inspired by his relationship with his own five-year-old.

== Critical reception ==
Chuck Taylor of Billboard magazine gave the song a mixed review, calling it "refreshingly more uptempo and optimistic than previous 'Superman' and '100 Years,' albeit still probing for the meaning of life." He went on to say that "the sap factor is pretty high here, limiting the song's appeal to moms and wistful philosophers, and there's little remaining doubt that Five for Fighting is pretty much a one-trick pony."

== Music video ==
In July 2006, a music video was released to accompany the single, directed by Vem (also credited for directing the videos for O.A.R.'s "Love and Memories" and The Click Five's "Just the Girl").

The video features Five for Fighting's frontman John Ondrasik allowing his imagination to run wild, when he finds a crayon in the sand while waiting for a tow truck to collect his overheated '65 Mustang. Hastily he scribbles a piano to perform the ballad, and then draws and colors out all sorts of various distractions, including buzzards, rainclouds and jet fighters.

== Charts ==
=== Weekly charts ===
Chart (2006–2007)	Peak position
Canada (Canadian Hot 100)	88
US Billboard Hot 100	40
US Adult Alternative Songs (Billboard)	27
US Adult Contemporary (Billboard)	4
US Adult Pop Airplay (Billboard)	8

=== Year-end charts ===
Chart (2006)	Position
US Adult Contemporary (Billboard)	15
US Adult Top 40 (Billboard)	20
Chart (2007)	Position
US Adult Contemporary (Billboard)	11
