= Gregg Wattenberg =

American songwriter and record producer

Gregg Wattenberg is an American record producer, based in New York City. Best known for his work with the alternative rock band Goo Goo Dolls, he has been nominated for a Grammy Award.

== Work ==
Gregg Wattenberg has co-written and/or co-produced eight No. 1 hit songs that reached the top of Billboard Hot AC, Adult Contemporary, Alternative Radio, and/or Rock charts.

Wattenberg co-wrote and co-produced John Legend's "Conversations in the Dark" which was RIAA certified Gold and the 1st lead single from the Bigger Love album, which won the Grammy Award for Best R&B album in 2021.

Wattenberg co-wrote and produced The Unlikely Candidates' No. 1 hit single "Novocaine" which reached the top spot on the Billboard Alternative Radio chart in 2020.

Wattenberg co-wrote and produced Phillip Phillips' No. 1 hit and RIAA Certified Platinum single "Gone, Gone, Gone" on the Platinum album The World from the Side of the Moon.

Wattenberg co-produced Train's No. 1 hit and RIAA Multi-Platinum single "Hey, Soul Sister" which was certified with a RIAA Diamond Award (10× Platinum) in 2021. Only 57 songs have been awarded RIAA Diamond certification in music history as of July 15, 2021.

Wattenberg also co-wrote and co-produced Train's No. 1 hit and RIAA Certified Platinum single "If It's Love".

Wattenberg co-wrote the Daughtry No. 1 hit and RIAA 2× Multi-Platinum single "It's Not Over" which was the lead single for the 6× Multi-Platinum album Daughtry.

Gregg Wattenberg co-wrote O.A.R.'s No. 1 song and RIAA Certified Platinum hit "Shattered (Turn the Car Around).”

Wattenberg also co-wrote Goo Goo Dolls Top 10 Adult Contemporary Single "Let Love In" from the RIAA Certified Gold album Let Love In.

Wattenberg produced Five for Fighting's No. 1 hit singles "Superman (It's Not Easy)" and "100 Years" and co-wrote and produced Top 5 AC single "Slice".

== Production discography ==
Year	Title	Artist	Label
2000	America Town	Five For Fighting	Columbia
2002	What If It All Means Something	Chantal Kreviazuk	Columbia
2002	Opaline	Dishwalla	Immergent
2003	It's All in Your Head	Eve 6	RCA
2004	The Battle for Everything	Five For Fighting	Columbia
2005	Never Gone	Backstreet Boys	Jive
2005	Beautiful Disorder	Breaking Point	Wind-up
2007	Consequence	The Crash Motive	Wind-up
2008	David Cook	David Cook	RCA
2009	Slice	Five For Fighting	Wind-up
2009	Wooden Bones	Pilot Speed	Wind-up
2009	Time For Lions	Stars of Track And Field	Wind-up
2009	Save Me San Francisco	Train	BME, Columbia
2010	Jason Castro	Jason Castro	Atlantic
2010	Life Turns Electric	Finger Eleven	Wind-up
2010	Alive	Ed Kowalczyk	Soul Whisper/RED
2011	This Loud Morning	David Cook	RCA
2012	The World from the Side of the Moon	Phillip Phillips	Interscope
2012	Train	California 37	Columbia
2013	Bookmarks	Five For Fighting	Wind-up
2013	Magnetic	Goo Goo Dolls	Warner Bros. Records
2014	Rewind	Rascal Flatts	Big Machine/Republic
2014	Behind the Light	Phillip Phillips	Interscope Records
2015	When the Morning Comes	A Great Big World	Epic Records
2016	Something Worth Saving	Gavin DeGraw	RCA
2017	Andrew McMahon in the Wilderness	Zombies on Broadway	Vanguard
2017	Just the Beginning	Grace Vanderwaal	Syco/Columbia
2020	Bigger Love	John Legend	Columbia
2021	Something About Christmas Time	Rob Thomas	Atlantic
2022	Chaos in Bloom	Goo Goo Dolls	Warner Bros.
2022	Legend	John Legend	John Legend/Republic
2023	We Happy Don't Worry	American Authors	French Poet Society
2023	Where the Light Goes	Matchbox Twenty	Atlantic
2023	Pour It Out Into the Night	The Revivalists	Concord

=== Songwriting written ===
Discography
Year	Artist	Album	Song	Co-written with
2002	Chantal Kreviazuk	What If It All Means Something	"Time"	Chantal Kreviazuk, Raine Maida
2006	Daughtry	Daughtry	"It's Not Over"	Chris Daughtry, Ace Young, Mark Wilkerson
2008	David Cook	David Cook	"Declaration"	David Cook, Johnny Rzeznik
2008	O.A.R.	All Sides	"Shattered (Turn the Car Around)"	Marc Roberge
2009	Five for Fighting	Slice	"Slice"	John Ondrasik
2009	Five for Fighting	Slice	"Chances"	John Ondrasik
2009	Five for Fighting	Slice	"Story of Your Life"	John Ondrasik
2009	Train	Save Me, San Francisco	"Parachute"	Pat Monahan
2009	Train	Save Me, San Francisco	"If It's Love"	Pat Monahan
2009	Train	Save Me, San Francisco	"You Already Know"	Pat Monahan, Jimmy Stafford, Scott Underwood
2010	Jason Castro	Jason Castro	"This Heart of Mine"	Jason Castro, Jason Rene, Marc Roberge, Shawn Maningly
2010	Finger Eleven	Life Turns Electric	"Living in a Dream"	Scott Anderson, Shawn Anderson, Rich Beddoe, James Black, Rick Jackett
2010	Hawthorne Heights	Skeletons	"Bring You Back"	Hawthorne Heights, James Thomas Woodruff
2010	Hawthorne Heights	Skeletons	"Nervous Breakdown"	Hawthorne Heights, James Thomas Woodruff
2010	Hawthorne Heights	Skeletons	"Here I Am"	Hawthorne Heights, James Thomas Woodruff
2010	Ed Kowalczyk	Alive	"Grace"	Ed Kowalczyk
2010	Ed Kowalczyk	Alive	"Stand"	Ed Kowalczyk
2010	The Maine	Black & White	"Give It to Me"	The Maine
2010	Thriving Ivory	Through Yourself & Back Again	"Love Alone"	Scott Jason, Clayton Stroope
2011	David Cook	This Loud Morning	"Right Here, with You"	David Cook, Johnny Rzeznik, Ryan Star
2011	James Durbin	Memories of a Beautiful Disaster	"Screaming"	James Durbin, David Cook, Ryan Star, Bobby Alt
2011	O.A.R.	King	"Heaven"	Marc Roberge, Ryan Baharloo, Derek Fuhrmann
2011	O.A.R.	King	"Gotta Be Wrong Sometimes"	Marc Roberge, Derek Fuhrmann
2011	O.A.R.	King	"Back to One"	Marc Roberge, Derek Fuhrmann, Matt Wallace
2011	O.A.R.	King	"World Like That"	Marc Roberge, Derek Fuhrmann, Richard On, Mikel Paris
2012	Phillip Phillips	The World from the Side of the Moon	"Gone, Gone, Gone"	Derek Fuhrmann, Todd Clark
2012	Phillip Phillips	The World from the Side of the Moon	"Get Up Get Down"	Phillip Phillips, Derek Fuhrmann
2012	Train	California 37	"California 37"	Pat Monahan, Diji Parq
2012	Train	California 37	"When the Fog Rolls In"	Pat Monahan
2013	Five for Fighting	Bookmarks	"What If"	John Ondrasik, Derek Fuhrmann, Jamie Kenney,
2013	Five for Fighting	Bookmarks	"Heaven Knows"	John Ondrasik, Derek Fuhrmann, Jamie Kenney,
2013	Goo Goo Dolls	Magnetic	"Rebel Beat"	Johnny Rzeznik
2013	Goo Goo Dolls	Magnetic	"When the World Breaks Your Heart"	Johnny Rzeznik, J. T. Harding
2013	Goo Goo Dolls	Magnetic	"Slow It Down"	Johnny Rzeznik
2013	Goo Goo Dolls	Magnetic	"Come to Me"	Johnny Rzeznik
2014	Phillip Phillips	Behind the Light	"Raging Fire"	Phillip Phillips, Derek Fuhrmann, Todd Clark
2014	Phillip Phillips	Behind the Light	"Fool for You"	Phillip Phillips, Derek Fuhrmann
2014	Phillip Phillips	Behind the Light	"Unpack Your Heart"	Phillip Phillips, Derek Fuhrmann, Todd Clark
2014	Phillip Phillips	Behind the Light	"Midnight Sun"	Phillip Phillips, Derek Fuhrmann
2014	Rascal Flatts	Rewind	"Powerful Stuff"	Derek Fuhrmann, Brett James
2015	A Great Big World	When the Morning Comes	"Kaleidoscope"	Antonina Armato, Derek Fuhrmann, Chad Vaccarino, Ian Axel, Tim James
2015	A Great Big World	When the Morning Comes	"Come On"	Derek Fuhrmann, Chad Vaccarino, Ian Axel
2016	Gavin DeGraw	Something Worth Saving	"She Sets the City on Fire"	Gavin DeGraw, Todd Clark, Jason Saenz
2016	Goo Goo Dolls	Boxes	"Flood" (feat. Sydney Sierota	Johnny Rzeznik, Derek Fuhrmann
2016	Goo Goo Dolls	Boxes	"Lucky One"	Johnny Rzeznik, Derek Fuhrmann
2016	Goo Goo Dolls	Boxes	"So Alive"	Johnny Rzeznik, Derek Fuhrmann
2016	Goo Goo Dolls	Boxes	"Long Way Home"	Johnny Rzeznik, Jordan Miller
2017	Andrew McMahon in the Wilderness	Zombies on Broadway	"Fire Escape"	Andrew McMahon, Daniel Omelio
2017	Andrew McMahon in the Wilderness	Zombies on Broadway	"Shot Out of a Cannon"	Andrew McMahon, Derek Fuhrmann
2017	Grace VanderWaal	Just the Beginning	"So Much More Than This"	Grace VanderWaal, Derek Fuhrmann
2017	Grace VanderWaal	Just the Beginning	"Escape My Mind"	Grace VanderWaal, Audubato
2017	Grace VanderWaal	Just the Beginning	"City Song"	Grace VanderWaal, Audubato
2017	The Score	ATLAS	"Unstoppable"	Eddie Anthony, Edan Dover, Steve Miller
2020	John Legend	Bigger Love	"Conversations in the Dark"	John Stephens, Jesse Fink, Kellen Pomeranz, Chance Peña
2021	Noah Kahan	I Was/I Am	"Bad Luck"	Noah Kahan, Kellen Pomeranz
2021	Rob Thomas	Something About Christmas Time	"Doesn't Feel Like Christmas (Samy's Song)"	Rob Thomas
2022	Goo Goo Dolls	Chaos in Bloom	"Yeah, I Like You"	Johnny Rzeznik
2022	Goo Goo Dolls	Chaos in Bloom	"War"	Johnny Rzeznik, Alex Aldi
2022	Goo Goo Dolls	Chaos in Bloom	"Going Crazy"	Johnny Rzeznik
2023	Andrew McMahon in the Wilderness	Tilt at the Wind No More	"Submarine"	Andrew McMahon, Derek Fuhrmann
2023	Matchbox Twenty	Where the Light Goes	"Wild Dogs (Running in a Slow Dream)"	Rob Thomas, Paul Doucette
2023	Matchbox Twenty	Where the Light Goes	"One Hit Love"	Rob Thomas, Paul Doucette
2023	The Revivalists	Pour It Out Into the Night	"How We Move"	Zack Feinberg, Sam Hollander, David Shaw
