= 100 Years (song) =

2003 single by Five for Fighting

Single by Five for Fighting

from the album The Battle for Everything
- B-side: "Sister Sunshine"; "Maybe I" (acoustic)
- Released: November 17, 2003
- Genre: Soft rock
- Length: 4:05
- Label: Columbia; Aware
- Songwriter: John Ondrasik
- Producer: Gregg Wattenberg

Five for Fighting singles chronology
"Something About You" (2003)	"100 Years" (2003)	"The Devil in the Wishing Well" (2004)

Music video
- "100 Years" on YouTube

"100 Years" is a song by American singer Five for Fighting. It was released on November 17, 2003, as the first single from his third studio album, The Battle for Everything (2004). A piano-driven soft rock ballad, the song explores life in different ages during a 100-year lifespan.

The single reached number one on the US Billboard Adult Contemporary chart and number 28 on the Billboard Hot 100. Critical reception was generally positive. In 2007, the song earned a Platinum certification from the Recording Industry Association of America for more than 1,000,000 copies sold. It also charted in Australia and New Zealand, peaking at number 32 in both countries.

== Background and composition ==
Written and composed by John Ondrasik, "100 Years" is in the key of G major, with a 4/4 time signature and vocal range of D4 to B5. The lyrics tell the perspective of a man recollecting key life moments from ages 15 to 99, including romance, fatherhood, and midlife crisis.

In a 2004 interview with VH1, Ondrasik summarized the message he wanted to convey in "100 Years": "You can't enjoy every moment. Obviously, life is not good all the time, but it's all we have."

In 2021, Ondrasik reflected on the songwriting of "100 Years" to American Songwriter:

..."100 Years" was a little post-it note saying, "Dude, just chill and appreciate the moment, recognize the moment." Once I had the lyric, "There's never a wish better than this," and I had the piano theme, I had this concept of let's let this song be a lifetime. Let's have each verse be the stages of our lives, let's move through the song.

== Critical reception ==
People praised "100 Years" as a "poignant piano-based tune" with a "well-crafted message", in a review rating The Battle for Everything 3.5 out of four stars. For Billboard, Chuck Taylor commented: "The innate vulnerability of Ondrasik's voice ideally suits the message, making this among the most intelligent, poignant songs of the year." Elysa Gardner of USA Today noticed "self-conscious sensitivity and bleating tenor" by Five for Fighting in "100 Years" and some other tracks on The Battle for Everything.

Todd Goldstein of PopMatters had a more mixed review, calling the song "catchy" but criticizing the lyrical themes as "obvious, painfully overdone".

== Chart performance ==
"100 Years" peaked on the US Billboard Hot 100 singles charts at number 28, for the week ending May 24, 2004. In December 2004, on the Billboard Year-End Hot 100 singles of 2004 chart, "100 Years" was ranked at number 77 overall for the year.

"100 Years" peaked at number one on the Billboard Adult Contemporary chart for the week ending May 7, 2004. It went on to be the longest-running number-one single of 2004 on the Adult Contemporary chart, staying at number one for 12 non-consecutive weeks. The song spent a total of 52 weeks on the Adult Contemporary chart.

== Music video ==
The music video was directed by Trey Fanjoy. VH1 began playing the "100 Years" video around January 12, 2004. For the week ending January 25, 2004, "100 Years" ranked ninth among VH1's 40 most played music videos.

In the video, images of Ondrasik singing and playing the song at the piano are intercut with fictional versions of himself as a 15-year-old boy, a 22-year-old, a 33-year-old, a man in his middle 40s, and finally a 99-year-old version of himself, reflecting the song's lyrics. At the end of the song, Ondrasik meets his older self. Los Angeles singer-songwriter Matthew Jordan appeared in the video as 15-year-old Ondrasik.

== Track listing ==
Australian CD single

1. "100 Years"
2. "Sister Sunshine"
3. "Maybe I" (acoustic version)
4. "100 Years" (acoustic version)

== Charts ==
=== Weekly charts ===
Chart (2003–2004)	Peak position
Australia (ARIA)	32
New Zealand (Recorded Music NZ)	32
US Billboard Hot 100	28
US Adult Alternative Airplay (Billboard)	12
US Adult Contemporary (Billboard)	1
US Adult Pop Airplay (Billboard)	3
US Pop Airplay (Billboard)	40

=== Year-end charts ===
Chart (2004)	Position
US Billboard Hot 100	77
US Adult Contemporary (Billboard)	3
US Adult Top 40 (Billboard)	8
US Triple-A (Billboard)	43

== Certifications ==
Region	Certification	Certified units/sales
New Zealand (RMNZ)	Gold	15,000^{‡}
United States (RIAA)	Platinum	1,000,000^{*}
^{*} Sales figures based on certification alone.^{‡} Sales+streaming figures based on certification alone.

== Release history ==
Region	Date	Format(s)	Label(s)	Ref.
United States	November 17, 2003	Hot adult contemporary; triple A radio	Columbia; Aware	
United States	January 12, 2004	Adult contemporary radio	Columbia; Aware	
United States	February 2, 2004	Contemporary hit radio	Columbia; Aware	
Australia	May 10, 2004	CD	Columbia; Aware	

== See also ==
- List of Billboard Adult Contemporary number ones of 2004
