= Behind the Light =

Studio album by Phillip Phillips
- Released: May 16, 2014
- Recorded: Quad Studios (New York, New York)
- Genre: Pop rock
- Length: 46:36
- Labels: Interscope; 19
- Producers: Derek Fuhrmann; Phillip Phillips; Gregg Wattenberg

Phillip Phillips chronology
The World from the Side of the Moon (2012)	Behind the Light (2014)	Collateral (2018)

Singles from Behind the Light
- 1. "Raging Fire" Released: March 3, 2014; 2. "Unpack Your Heart" Released: August 12, 2014

Behind the Light is the second studio album by American recording artist Phillip Phillips. It was released on May 16, 2014, by Interscope Records.

== Background ==
The album was produced by Gregg Wattenberg, Dereck Fuhrmann, and Phillip Phillips, and was recorded in New York City. Phillips discussed the concept of the album at the Billboard Music Awards red carpet:

"It's so much more mature; I got to spend some more time on it. It's a little more on the rock side, which is me and how I represent it when I play live... I wanted to keep it the same because they know how I like to write," the 23-year-old says. "We worked so well together. It's very organic and it's not getting all these writers to come in [and say], 'We need a big pop song.' That's not how it is. It's an album as a whole, not just singles." - Phillip Phillips

== Release and promotion ==
Both Standard and Deluxe Editions became available on May 19, 2014.

=== Singles ===
"Raging Fire", the lead single was released on March 3, 2014. The song speaks about "the power of love" and as described by Phillips "it's just a song wanting to feel those butterflies, you know you love and you know the first time you kissed that person" he says in an interview with Access Hollywood. The song was later solicited to Adult Album Alternative radio on March 17, 2014. The song received critical acclaim by music critics who praised Phillips vocals. He performed the song live on various TV shows, including The Ellen DeGeneres Show, American Idol and on Conan. Phillips also performed on Good Morning America on May 20 and on Today on June 27 and he returned to the PBS Independence Day celebration TV special, A Capitol Fourth. The music video for "Raging Fire" premiered on Vevo on April 10. Before its release, Phillips stated that he and his writers just wrote the song a week prior to the release. The song was featured in the National Hockey League's Playoffs. Phillips received his first BMI pop music song writing award for "Raging Fire".

On April 22, "Fly" was released as a promotional single.

The second single from the album is "Unpack Your Heart". The song was featured in a TV commercial for Ram 1500 trucks, which premiered at the American Music Awards of 2014.

== Critical reception ==
Professional ratings
Review scores
Source	Rating
AllMusic	3/5 stars
Knoxville News Sentinel	3.5/5 stars
Newsday	B
The Oakland Press	2.5/4 stars
USA Today	2.5/4 stars

Behind the Light received mixed to positive reviews from music critics. At AllMusic, Stephen Thomas Erlewine rated the album three stars out of five, saying that "Perhaps Phillips has yet to find his distinctive voice, but there's no question he can color within the lines exceedingly well." Brian Mansfield of USA Today rated the album two-and-a-half stars out of four, writing that "Phillips may not have a Home-style hit here, but does have the consistency and confidence that come with steady performing." At The Oakland Press, Gary Graff rated the album two-and-a-half stars out of four, stating that Phillips' deserved some "Props, then, for incremental growth, and respect for a more genuinely organic grounding than most of his 'Idol' brethren." Glenn Gamboa of Newsday graded the album a B, saying that "Phillip Phillips takes a giant leap forward on his sophomore album". At Billboard, Shirley Halprin gave the album a positive review, writing how "'Behind the Light' feels more like a collection of big singles as opposed to a coherent album, with ebbs and flows" on which Phillips "mostly adheres to a strict formula: acoustic-based melodies accented by strings, building up to a huge hook and back again." Chuck Campbell of Knoxville News Sentinel rated the album three-and-a-half stars out of five, stating that "His lyrics may be tortured at times, but sometimes he nails it".

== Commercial performance ==
The album debuted on the Billboard 200 at No. 7 with sales of 41,000 units in the U.S. The album has sold 123,000 copies in the U.S. as of December 2014.

== Track listing ==
- The track listing was announced April 22, 2014.

Behind the Light — Standard edition
No.	Title	Writer(s)	Producer(s)	Length
1.	"Searchlight"	Phillip Phillips; Jon Green		4:12
2.	"Raging Fire"	Phillips; Todd Clark; Derek Fuhrmann; Gregg Wattenberg	Wattenberg	3:54
3.	"Trigger"	Phillips		3:59
4.	"Lead On"	Phillips; Clark; Fuhrmann		3:14
5.	"Alive Again"	Phillips; David Ryan Harris		3:07
6.	"Open Your Eyes"	Phillips		4:11
7.	"Fool for You"	Phillips; Fuhrmann; Wattenberg		3:32
8.	"Thicket"	Phillips		5:02
9.	"Fly"	Phillips; Clark	Clark	4:54
10.	"Unpack Your Heart"	Phillips; Clark; Fuhrmann; Wattenberg		3:16
11.	"Face"	Phillips		3:55
12.	"Midnight Sun"	Phillips; Furhmann; Wattenberg		3:21

Behind the Light — Deluxe edition
No.	Title	Writer(s)	Length
13.	"My Boy"	Phillips; Finian Greenall	4:39
14.	"Don't Trust Me"	Phillips	3:36
15.	"Armless Crawler"	Phillips	3:53

Behind the Light — Target edition bonus tracks
No.	Title	Writer(s)	Length
16.	"Grace"	Phillips	4:19

Behind the Light — United Kingdom & Ireland edition
No.	Title	Writer(s)	Producer(s)	Length
1.	"Searchlight"	Phillips; Green		4:12
2.	"Raging Fire"	Phillips; Clark; Fuhrmann; Wattenberg	Wattenberg	3:45
3.	"Trigger"	Phillips		3:59
4.	"Lead On"	Phillips; Clark; Fuhrmann		3:14
5.	"Alive Again"	Phillips; Harris		3:07
6.	"Open Your Eyes"	Phillips		4:11
7.	"Fool for You"	Phillips; Fuhrmann; Wattenberg		3:32
8.	"Thicket"	Phillips		5:02
9.	"Fly"	Phillips; Clark	Clark	4:54
10.	"Unpack Your Heart"	Phillips; Clark; Fuhrmann; Wattenberg		3:16
11.	"Face"	Phillips		3:55
12.	"Midnight Sun"	Phillips; Fuhrmann; Wattenberg		3:21
13.	"Home"	Drew Pearson; Greg Holden	Pearson	3:28
14.	"Gone, Gone, Gone"	Clark; Fuhrmann; Wattenberg	Wattenberg	3:29

Behind the Light — United Kingdom & Ireland deluxe edition
No.	Title	Writer(s)	Producer(s)	Length
1.	"Searchlight"	Phillips, Green		4:12
2.	"Raging Fire"	Phillips; Clark; Fuhrmann; Wattenberg	Wattenberg	3:45
3.	"Trigger"	Phillips		3:59
4.	"Lead Ons"	Phillips; Clark; Fuhrmann		3:14
5.	"Alive Again"	Phillips; Harris		3:07
6.	"Open Your Eyes"	Phillips		4:11
7.	"Fool for You"	Phillips; Fuhrmann; Wattenberg		3:32
8.	"Thicket"	Phillips		5:02
9.	"Fly"	Phillips; Clark	Clark	4:54
10.	"Unpack Your Heart"	Phillips; Clark; Fuhrmann; Wattenberg		3:16
11.	"Face"	Phillips		3:55
12.	"Midnight Sun"	Phillips; Fuhrmann; Wattenberg
13.	"My Boy"	Phillips; Greenall		4:39
14.	"Don't Trust Me"	Phillips		3:36
15.	"Armless Crawler"	Phillips		3:53
16.	"Home"	Pearson; Holden	Pearson	3:28
17.	"Gone, Gone, Gone"	Clark; Fuhrmann; Wattenberg	Wattenberg	3:29

== Personnel ==
Credits adapted from AllMusic.

- Phillip Phillips – Guitar, producer, vocals
- John Alicastro – Background vocals
- Randy Andros – Trombone
- Dallin Applebaum – Background vocals
- Keith Armstrong – Mixing assistant
- Carrie Q. Brown – Background vocals
- Rob Carmichael – Art direction, design
- Todd Clark – Background vocals
- Errol Cooney – Guitar
- Jack Daley – Bass
- Michael Davis – Trombone
- Ian Discoll – Background vocals, engineer
- Dave Egger – Cello, soloist, string arrangement
- Mark Endert – Mixing
- Derek Fuhrmann – Background vocals, drum programming, guitar, keyboards, piano producer
- Jon Green – Piano engineer, vocal engineer
- David Ryan Harris – Drum programming
- James Hynes – Trumpet
- Katie Jacoby – Violin
- Ted Jensen – Mastering
- Doug Johnson – Mixing assistant
- Jeff Juliano – Mixing
- Anthony Kadleck – Trumpet
- Marris Kainuma – Tuba
- Nik Kainuma – Mixing assistant
- Ryan Keberle – Trombone
- Adam Krauthamer – French horn
- Katie Kresek – String arrangement, violin
- Michael Lauri – Background vocals
- Chad Lefkowitz-Brown – Tenor saxophone
- Ryan Lipman – Mixing assistant
- Chris Lord-Alge –Mixing
- David Mann – Saxophone
- Gabriel McMahon – Background vocals, percussion
- Elisabeth Mercante – background vocals
- Maxim Moston – Violin
- Trevor Neumon – Trumpet
- Gunnar Olsen – Drums
- Chuck Palmer – Percussion, string arrangements
- Victoria Paterson – Violin
- Shawn Pelton – Drums, percussion
- Ross Petersen – Engineer
- Robert Randolph – Pedal steel guitar
- Alycia Scott – Background vocals
- Lee Scurry – Producer
- Lenny Skolnik – Pro-tools vocals
- Robert "JJ" Smith Jr. – Bass
- Andy Snitzar – Horn arrangement, saxophone
- Bobby Sparks III – Keyboards
- Rod Steger – Keyboard engineer
- Meredith Strang – Background vocals
- Jason "JT" Thomas – Drums
- Jonathan Verti – Background vocals
- Nick Walker – Photography
- Gregg Wattenberg – Background vocals, guitar, producer
- Dana Wise – Background vocals
- Paul Woodiel – Violin
- Robin Zek – Violin
- Joe Zook – Mixing

== Charts ==
=== Peak positions ===
Chart	Peak position
Canadian Albums (Billboard)	7
US Billboard 200	7

== Release history ==
List of release dates, showing region, label, format and edition(s)
Region	Date	Format(s)	Label	Edition(s)
Australia	May 16, 2014	CD, digital download	Universal Music Group	Standard, Deluxe
Brazil	May 16, 2014	CD, digital download	Universal Music Group	Standard, Deluxe
France	May 16, 2014	CD, digital download	Universal Music Group	Standard, Deluxe
Italy	May 16, 2014	CD, digital download	Universal Music Group	Standard, Deluxe
Netherlands	May 16, 2014	CD, digital download	Interscope Records	Standard, Deluxe
Poland	May 16, 2014	CD, digital download	Universal Music Group	Standard, Deluxe
Canada	May 19, 2014	CD, digital download	Universal Music Group	Standard, Deluxe
Japan	May 19, 2014	CD, digital download	Universal Music Group	Standard, Deluxe
United Kingdom	May 19, 2014	CD, digital download	Polydor UK	Standard, Deluxe
United States	May 19, 2014	CD, digital download	Interscope Records, 19	Standard, Deluxe
Germany	May 20, 2014	CD, digital download	Universal Music Group	Standard, Deluxe
Ireland	July 25, 2014	CD, digital download	Universal Music Group	Standard, Deluxe
