= Where the Light Goes =

Studio album by Matchbox Twenty
- Released: May 26, 2023
- Recorded: 2022
- Genre: Pop rock
- Length: 44:38
- Label: Atlantic
- Producer: Kyle Cook; Paul Doucette; Gregg Wattenberg

Matchbox Twenty chronology
| North (2012) | Where the Light Goes (2023) |

Singles from Where the Light Goes
- 1. "Wild Dogs (Running in a Slow Dream)" Released: March 17, 2023; 2. "Don't Get Me Wrong" Released: May 5, 2023

Professional ratings
Review scores
| Source | Rating |
|---|---|
| AllMusic | 4/5 stars |

Where the Light Goes is the fifth studio album by American rock band Matchbox Twenty, released on May 26, 2023, by Atlantic Records. On March 17, 2023, the band released the first single from the album, "Wild Dogs (Running in a Slow Dream)". The album debuted at number 53 on the US Billboard 200 with 13,000 album-equivalent units in its first week.

Where the Light Goes is the band's first album in over a decade since North in 2012. This is also the first album of new material by the band not to be produced by longtime producer Matt Serletic, and also the first to not have any of its singles chart on the Mainstream Top 40 chart and last album with Atlantic Records. The album was produced by Gregg Wattenberg with band members Paul Doucette and Kyle Cook.

== Background ==
As they were about to embark on a 2020 tour, the members of Matchbox Twenty had come to the conclusion that they had no desire to make a new album and were now primarily a touring band that would occasionally release new songs. The tour was cancelled due to the COVID-19 pandemic, and though the band announced new dates for 2022, those were subsequently postponed as well. With the tour rescheduled once again to 2023, Kyle Cook suggested that the band record a new album after all in order to give their fans something new to make up for their long period of inactivity.

Paul Doucette claimed that Where the Light Goes is the "most joyful" album the band has ever made, stating: "I also think this is a record where we let ourselves not be defined by the word 'band'." Rob Thomas stated: "It sounded like who we are, we know who we are, but also a glimpse of what we sound like in 2023, which I'm glad". Thomas continued: "Of everything about this record, the one thing I'm glad is that I got to see a glimpse of what we sound like when we make music together now".

== Track listing ==
| No. | Title | Writer(s) | Producer(s) | Length |
|---|---|---|---|---|
| 1. | "Friends" | Paul Doucette | Gregg Wattenberg; Doucette | 4:46 |
| 2. | "Wild Dogs (Running in a Slow Dream)" | Rob Thomas; Doucette; Wattenberg | Wattenberg; Doucette | 3:30 |
| 3. | "Rebels" | Thomas; Doucette | Wattenberg; Doucette | 3:44 |
| 4. | "One Hit Love" | Thomas; Doucette; Wattenberg | Wattenberg | 3:43 |
| 5. | "Warm Blood" | Doucette | Wattenberg; Doucette | 3:48 |
| 6. | "Queen of New York City" | Thomas; Eric Arjes; Jeffrey Joseph East | Wattenberg | 3:32 |
| 7. | "Where the Light Goes" | Thomas | Wattenberg | 3:52 |
| 8. | "Hang on Every Word" | Doucette | Wattenberg | 4:08 |
| 9. | "Don't Get Me Wrong" | Thomas; David Garcia; Craig Wiseman | Wattenberg | 2:53 |
| 10. | "I Know Better" | Kyle Cook | Wattenberg | 3:48 |
| 11. | "No Other Love" (featuring Amanda Shires) | Doucette; Deana Carter | Wattenberg; Doucette | 3:36 |
| 12. | "Selling Faith" | Thomas | Wattenberg; Cook | 3:18 |
| Total length: | | | | 44:38 |

== Personnel ==
Matchbox Twenty

- Rob Thomas – lead vocals (tracks 1–9, 11–12), backing vocals (1–3, 6, 9, 10)
- Brian Yale – bass guitar (all tracks)
- Paul Doucette – backing vocals (1–6, 8, 10, 11–12), drums (1–5, 7, 8, 10, 11), rhythm guitar (1–5, 7, 11–12), keyboards (1–3, 5, 7, 8, 11), programming (1, 2, 5, 11), piano (2, 8, 11–12), additional drums (6)
- Kyle Cook – lead guitar (all tracks), backing vocals (1–4, 6, 7, 9, 12), mandolin (1, 3, 7), keyboards (3, 10, 12), ukulele (3, 6, 8), banjo (3), piano (6, 7, 9, 12), lead vocals (10)

Additional musicians

- Gregg Wattenberg – background vocals (1–6, 8, 9, 11, 12), programming (1, 2, 5, 10, 11), keyboards (2–12), guitar (2–4), piano (8)
- Dallin Applebaum – background vocals (1), choir (4)
- Grace McClean – background vocals (1), choir (4)
- Katie Marshall – background vocals (1), choir (4)
- Mia Wattenberg – background vocals (1, 3, 8, 9), children's choir (1), choir (4), piano (6)
- Rebecca Gastfriend – background vocals (1), choir (4)
- Tiger Darrow – background vocals (1), choir (4)
- Asha Denhoy – children's choir (1)
- Aya Mitchell – children's choir (1)
- Joey Capella – children's choir (1)
- Maia Denhoy – children's choir (1)
- Jett Doucette-Zappa – guest vocals (1), background vocals (11)
- Andy Snitzer – horn arrangement, baritone saxophone, tenor saxophone (1, 6, 10, 11)
- Michael Davis – bass trombone, tenor trombone (1, 6, 10, 11)
- Tony Kadleck – flugelhorn, trumpet (1, 6, 10, 11)
- Matt Beck – piano (1, 4, 6, 10, 11)
- Cillian Vallely – uilleann pipes (1)
- Tina Dawn – background vocals (2, 7, 9)
- John Metcalfe – conductor, string arrangement (4, 8)
- Richard Harwood – lead cello (4, 8)
- Chris Worsey – cello (4, 8)
- Ian Burdge – cello (4, 8)
- Sophie Harris – cello (4, 8)
- Vickie Matthews – cello (4, 8)
- Peter Lale – lead viola (4, 8)
- Helen Kammings – viola (4, 8)
- Ian Rathbone – viola (4, 8)
- Reiad Chibah – viola (4, 8)
- Everton Nelson – violin leader (4, 8)
- Alison Dods – second violin (4, 8)
- Charles Mutter – second violin (4, 8)
- Ian Humphries – second violin (4, 8)
- John Mills – second violin (4, 8)
- Louis Fuller – second violin (4, 8)
- Nicky Sweeney – second violin (4, 8)
- Richard George – second violin (4, 8)
- Rick Koster – second violin (4, 8)
- Steve Morris – second violin (4, 8)
- Tim Pigott-Smith – second violin (4, 8)
- Gunnar Olsen – drums (6, 9)
- Amanda Shires – backing vocals (11)

Technical

- Randy Merrill – mastering
- Manny Marroquin – mixing (1, 3, 6, 8, 9)
- Serban Ghenea – mixing (2)
- Rob Kinelski – mixing (4, 5, 7, 10–12)
- Kevin Killen – recording
- Ethan Feinberg – recording (1, 11), engineering assistance (2–10, 12)
- Lewis Jones – orchestral engineering (4, 8)
- Anthony Vilchis – mixing assistance (1, 3, 6, 8, 9)
- Trey Station – mixing assistance (1, 3, 6, 8, 9)
- Zach Pereyra – mixing assistance (1, 3, 6, 8, 9)
- Bryce Bordone – mixing assistance (2)
- Eli Heisler – mixing assistance (4, 5, 7, 10–12)
- Cole Lumpkin – engineering assistance (1, 3–9, 11)
- Dan McDonald – engineering assistance (1, 6, 11)
- Matt Jones – engineering assistance (4, 8)

== Charts ==
Chart performance for Where the Light Goes
| Chart (2023) | Peak position |
|---|---|
| Australian Albums (ARIA) | 2 |
| German Albums (Offizielle Top 100) | 77 |
| New Zealand Albums (RMNZ) | 26 |
| Scottish Albums (OCC) | 9 |
| Swiss Albums (Schweizer Hitparade) | 79 |
| UK Album Downloads (OCC) | 10 |
| UK Physical Albums (OCC) | 12 |
| US Billboard 200 | 53 |
| US Top Rock Albums (Billboard) | 7 |
