= America Town =

Studio album by Five for Fighting
- Released: September 26, 2000
- Recorded: 1999–2000
- Genres: Rock; soft rock; pop; alternative rock
- Length: 45:39
- Labels: Aware; Columbia
- Producer: Gregg Wattenberg

Five for Fighting chronology
Message for Albert (1997)	America Town (2000)	The Battle for Everything (2004)

Singles from America Town
- 1. "Easy Tonight" Released: September 2000; 2. "Superman (It's Not Easy)" Released: April 2001; 3. "America Town" Released: 2002; 4. "Something About You" Released: 2003

America Town is the second studio album by American pop rock artist Five for Fighting. It was released by Aware Records, a Columbia Records subsidiary, in 2000. It contains two of his most well-known songs, "Easy Tonight" and the Grammy-nominated "Superman (It's Not Easy)". The album was certified Gold by the RIAA on November 1, 2001, and Platinum on October 22, 2004. The album has sold over 966,000 copies in the United States as of November 2009.

== Background and composition ==
John Ondrasik had been active in the Los Angeles music scene since the 1980s, but did not adopt "Five for Fighting" as his stage name until he signed with EMI Records in 1995. His first album, Message for Albert, came out through EMI in 1997 but EMI's American division closed shortly after Message came out. After EMI's collapse, Ondrasik briefly signed with Island Records, but then "PolyGram, Island's parent company, merged with Universal and he was lost in the shuffle". Ondrasik then signed with Aware and Columbia Records and began working on America Town. After being dropped from two straight record companies, Ondrasik, then in his mid-30s, believed America Town would be his "swan song".

America Town features ten new songs and two songs that were re-recorded from the ill-fated Message album ("Love Song" and "The Last Great American"). The hidden track, "Do You Mind", had also appeared on some versions of Message.

Ondrasik wrote all of the songs and lyrics. Gregg Wattenburg, the album's producer, played electric guitar throughout the album and provided backing vocals. Ondrasik also played electric guitar on "Michael Jordan" and "Boat Parade". Dorian Crozier was the drummer for all songs except "Love Song", which saw Robert Medici reprise the role (he had been the drummer on the Message for Albert version of the song). The bassists were Sheldon Gomberg and Mark Montague.

== Critical reception ==
Professional ratings
Review scores
Source	Rating
AllMusic	3/5 stars
Melodic	3/5 stars
Q	4/5 stars

AllMusic called America Town "a bright and clean effort that delivers some heavy themes", and noted that "the focus is clearly on the lyrics, which are well written and effectively sung".

== Commercial performance ==
"Easy Tonight" was released as the lead single. The second single, "Superman (It's Not Easy)" achieved mainstream success, peaking at number one on the Adult Top 40. Superman was nominated for a Grammy in 2002. Following the success of "Superman", "Easy Tonight" was released as a single a second time, reaching number 18 on the Adult Top 40. Two more singles followed ("America Town" and "Something About You"), but neither song replicated the mainstream success of "Superman" and "Easy Tonight".

The success of America Town meant that the album had not been Ondrasik's swan song, as he had anticipated. His third studio album, The Battle for Everything, came out in 2004 and was also certified platinum.

"Superman" was certified gold by the RIAA in 2005.

== Track listing ==
All songs written by John Ondrasik.

No.	Title	Length
1.	"Easy Tonight"	4:09
2.	"Bloody Mary (A Note on Apathy)"	3:46
3.	"Superman (It's Not Easy)"	3:45
4.	"America Town"	3:52
5.	"Something About You"	4:02
6.	"Jainy"	3:53
7.	"Michael Jordan"	3:04
8.	"Out of Love"	3:53
9.	"The Last Great American"	3:00
10.	"Love Song"	3:41
11.	"Boat Parade"	2:50
12.	"Alright" (Includes hidden song "Do You Mind?", which begins at 3:34)	5:39

== Charts ==
=== Weekly charts ===
Weekly chart performance for America Town
Chart (2001–2002)	Peak position
Australian Albums (ARIA)	30
Canadian Albums (Nielsen SoundScan)	67
Irish Albums (IRMA)	72
New Zealand Albums (RMNZ)	24
Norwegian Albums (VG-lista)	20
UK Albums (OCC)	169
US Billboard 200	54

=== Year-end charts ===
Year-end chart performance for America Town
Chart (2002)	Position
Canadian Albums (Nielsen SoundScan)	197
Canadian Alternative Albums (Nielsen SoundScan)	64

== Certifications ==
Certifications for America Town
Region	Certification	Certified units/sales
Canada (Music Canada)	Gold	50,000^{^}
United States (RIAA)	Platinum	1,000,000^{^}
^{^} Shipments figures based on certification alone.
