= Two Lights (album) =

Studio album by Five for Fighting
- Released: August 1, 2006
- Genre: Alternative rock; soft rock
- Length: 43:33
- Label: Aware; Columbia

Five for Fighting chronology
The Battle for Everything (2004)	Two Lights (2006)	Slice (2009)

Singles from Two Lights
- 1. "The Riddle" Released: May 15, 2006; 2. "World" Released: November 13, 2006; 3. "I Just Love You" Released: 2007

Professional ratings
Review scores
Source	Rating
AllMusic	3/5 stars
Entertainment Weekly	C
Melodic	4/5 stars

Two Lights is the fourth studio album by American singer Five for Fighting. The first single is titled "The Riddle". The song was released on May 15, 2006, and the album was released on August 1, 2006.

The album peaked at number eight on the Billboard 200 chart, making it Five for Fighting's highest-charting album to date. It has sold over 287,000 copies in the United States as of November 2009.

== Track listing ==
No.	Title	Length
1.	"Freedom Never Cries"	4:22
2.	"World"	3:52
3.	"California Justice"	4:22
4.	"The Riddle"	3:49
5.	"Two Lights"	4:45
6.	"65 Mustang"	4:22
7.	"I Just Love You"	4:02
8.	"Policeman's Xmas Party"	4:09
9.	"Road To Heaven"	5:36
10.	"Johnny America"	4:14

The Best Buy Edition includes two bonus tracks, including

1. "The Riddle (acoustic)"
2. "Drive You On"

The iTunes Store also released a special edition with two bonus tracks:

1. "The Riddle (Acoustic)"
2. "Easy Tonight (Acoustic)"

There were also two songs taken out just before release.

1. "China on the Horizon"
2. "Who Will Save My Life Tonight?"

On May 22, 2020, Five for Fighting announced on Twitter that he released "China on the Horizon" on most major music platforms. It is not known if "Who Will Save My Life Tonight?" will be released in the future.

== Charts ==
Chart performance for Two Lights
Chart (2006)	Peak position
Canadian Albums (Nielsen SoundScan)	30
US Billboard 200	8
US Top Rock Albums (Billboard)	3
