= Raging Fire (song) =

Single by Phillip Phillips

from the album Behind the Light
- Released: March 3, 2014
- Recorded: February, 2014 in Quad Studios (New York City)
- Genre: Pop rock; folk rock
- Length: 3:45
- Label: Interscope
- Songwriters: Phillip Phillips; Todd Clark; Derek Fuhrmann; Gregg Wattenberg
- Producer: Gregg Wattenberg

Phillip Phillips singles chronology
"Where We Came From" (2013)	"Raging Fire" (2014)	""Unpack Your Heart"" (2014)

"Raging Fire" is a song by American recording artist Phillip Phillips from his second studio album, Behind the Light. "Raging Fire" was written by Phillips, Todd Clark, Derek Fuhrmann, and Gregg Wattenberg. Recorded in New York City, the production was also handled by Wattenberg and was released as the album's lead single on March 3, 2014, by Interscope Records. A music video for the song was released on April 10, 2014.

"Raging Fire" is a pop rock and folk rock song with comparisons to Phillips' first single "Home". The song peaked at number 58 in the United States and number 26 in Canada. The song also earned Phillips' his third top ten on Adult Top 40 charts.

== Background ==
"Derek [Fuhrmann], Todd [Clark] and I literally wrote that song a week and a half ago. Todd and I were working on a different idea. He had half of the first verse and we said let’s try something else. It wasn’t working out, so I said let's go back to the original idea. I’m glad we did because I really like this song. We got it mixed and mastered in a few days. On a Tuesday, the label said they wanted to put it out the following Monday." Phillip Phillips interviewed with The Hollywood Reporter.

The song was recorded at Quad Studios in New York City and was written by Phillip Phillips, Todd Clark, Derek Fuhrmann and Gregg Wattenberg, Wattenberg also produced the song himself. Phillips explained to Billboard on an interview on the making of the song, "We sent it to the label [Interscope Records] – we already had a few other singles, but we sent them that one, and they were really excited and wanted to put it out [immediately]," Phillips explains. "It's a love song, but it's also a little heavier, too. It's got a little bit of an edgier side to it, and I really like that." In addition, Phillips had mixed feelings of performing live on Fox saying, "I like seeing all the people that I got to know… It's cool to see all those faces," he says. "But it's also weird for me to get back up onstage and sing, because I hate live television, and I'm gonna be scared to death when I get up there. It's always a little nerve-wracking."

In an interview with Access Hollywood, Phillips explained more about the meaning of the song:

“"Yeah, it's a little more rock, but uh you know, it's just a song wanting to feel those butterflies, you know you love and you know the first time you kissed that person, in the music video, you know I had this kind of idea to be a part of a painting.”

== Composition and lyrical interpretation ==
=== Composition ===
According to the sheet music published at Musicnotes.com by Universal Music Publishing Group, "Raging Fire" a fast-tempo song of 126 beats per minute. It has Alternative pop/rock Folk rock Pop rock influences. Phillips vocals ranges from D4 to D5 and the composed key is a G major. Phillip Phillips, Todd Clark, Derek Fuhrmann, Gregg Wattenberg all composed "Raging Fire" together.

=== Lyrical interpretation ===
Direct Lyrics explained the meaning of the song saying that "The lyrics talk about the power of love. And Phillip Phillips shows off his rootsy vocals. The production features strings as well as upbeat jangle and thumps." Simon Cleary of MUSICInsideU said:

"The meaning of Phillip Phillips' Raging Fire is the power of love. We've all heard songs with lines like "your love lights up my life." Those lines sound clichè [sic] if the singer doesn't believe in their meaning. Raging Fire does mean it, and you can hear it, louder than the guitar, bigger than the lyrics, in how much Phillip wants his soul to be turned into a raging fire. The single means that love has to be like fire – nothing it touches stays the same. Raging fire reminds us how much we all need that heat."

== Release, reception and promotion ==
Phillips premiered the single artwork on his Instagram account on February 25, announcing the release date of the single being March 3. On February 28, Phillips released a snippet from the song on Instagram. The song was released to iTunes on March 3. "Raging Fire" impacted Adult album alternative radio on March 17, 2014. On March 5, a lyric video of the song was uploaded on Vevo. On April 10, the music video premiered on Vevo. The release date of the Top 40/Mainstream radio adds is yet to be revealed according to Playiga.com.

=== Promotion ===
“Raging Fire" featured in the National Hockey League's Playoffs in 2014. The Spotlights aired on Local Television stations and networks such as NBC and NHL Network's in the United States and Canada. The song appeared in a tribute to Dusty Rhodes that aired on the June 15 episode of WWE Raw a week after his death.

=== Critical reception ===
Upon its release, "Raging Fire" garnered acclaim from music critics. Direct Lyrics gave a positive review, " The chorus is stellar, and the feel-good energy the track oozes is similar to “Home", and this will, undoubtedly, make "Raging Fire" set the charts ablaze. Interscope Records ain't playing with the return of King PP." Whitney Phaneuf of HitFix Music also gave a positive review, ""Raging Fire" is as radio-friendly as Phillips’ previous hits "Home" and "Gone, Gone, Gone," but features an anthemic chorus that's reminiscent of Fun.’s "We Are Young". Phillips told Billboard that he's trying to experiment with his sound." According to Life of a Rockstar (LOAR), "The song alternates between strings, bold drums, folk enhanced synth with moments of quiet that highlight the sexy sound of Phillips a cappella. "Raging Fire" is perfect example of how music can embody and fuse together a stunning presentation of rock with an acoustic persuasion."

Jonathan Frahm of Yahoo! Voices considered ""Raging Fire" at its lyrical core is a love song, and Phillips delivers an upbeat, hopeful vocal that accentuates the free-to-live, free-to-love nature of the single. Instrumentally, the song is infectiously booming in its delivery, featuring a chorus of strings, full-on drums, and rhythmic acoustic guitar work that is bound to get listeners up on their feet, or at least dancing in their minds at the office." To him the song is "a pop/rock release full of a slew of catchy hooks that is altogether radio-friendly and full of depth at the same time". According to Carter Matt, "The song has some moments that bring to mind “Gone, Gone, Gone" as well as "Home," but we mostly consider that to be a good thing. These are songs that America responded well to, and they helped to turn his first album "The World from the Side of the Moon" into a massive hit. So to go back to that familiar bag of tricks, and to add a few new elements, was a smart move. We have no doubt that this will be anything other than a big hit on the adult contemporary charts, and we could also see it getting a little bit of play on top 40 radio."

Marcos Papadatos of Digital Journal gave a strong positive review, "It is a great love song with a neat beat and the lyrics are quite vivid. Phillips uses a "raging fire" as an allusion of love and it works effectively. The tune's melody is infectious, similar to his single "Gone Gone Gone." His vocals are crisp and reminiscent of those of his musical hero, Dave Matthews." He also added that, ""Raging Fire" is a substantial indication that Phillip Phillips is still at the top of his game, as well as one of the best male vocalists in American Idol history, along with Adam Lambert, David Cook and Kris Allen. In this song, he showcases a great deal of personality and his vocals are unique. The moment you hear him on the radio, you know it is Phillip. It garners 4.5 out of 5 stars." Bill Lamb from about.com listed "Raging Fire" on "Top 10 New Pop Songs March 4, 2014" at number 2, behind Coldplay's "Magic".

Shirley Halperin of Billboard, during her album review of Behind the Light, called the song "is Coldplay-esque".

=== Commercial performance ===
After the performance on American Idol, the song broke into the top ten of the iTunes chart. On March 14, 2014, the song debuted at number 58 on the Billboard Hot 100, the second highest new entry of the week, with 74,000 digital copies sold. On the Adult Top 40, it debuted at number 36. In the United States, the song fell off of the Billboard Hot 100 a week later, but it managed to climb up on Adult Pop Songs at number 26.

In the United States the song has since peaked at number 58, and in Canada peaked higher at number 35. The song fell off the Billboard Hot 100 the next week after its debut, in Canada the song also dropped to number 62. It has steadily been climbing up the Radio airplay charts including Adult Alternative Songs, Adult Contemporary, and Adult Top 40, which the song peaked in the Top 20s.

According to Playiga.com by Interscope Geffen A&M, the song has sold 223,000 digital copies. In addition it reports that Phillips will promote the song on his Headline Tour in June ending in July.

== Music video ==
Phillips laying down to be painted into a Raging Fire.

According to USA Today, the music video was shot in Chicago and was directed by Ethan Lader, who has directed music videos for other artists such as Mariah Carey, Enrique Iglesias, and Wiz Khalifa. On April 10, 2014, the music video premiered on Vevo.

=== Concept and synopsis ===
It features the singer in various locations in Chicago, throughout those parts, Phillips is seen wearing the same attire. In the other parts of the video, Phillips is seen lying down and being painted on, later revealing the painting to be a "raging fire" and Phillips is at the core of the fire.

=== Reception ===
Direct Lyrics gave a positive review, "I'm not going to lie...it could have been better! The close-up shots when we see Phillip performing "Raging Fire" with his guitar are undoubtedly the best. You can feel his 'raging fire' passion." Another positive review came from Jason Scott of Pop Dust says, "As he continues to sing the poignant lyrics, his friends are seen painting around him on the paper. He looks up to the camera, delivering the powerful message. It progresses and finally he is covered in the vibrant red paint, in the middle of a glowing heart. He has become a raging fire, unafraid of the world around him. That’s a pretty cool visual." Markos Papadatos of Digital journal gave an "A" rating on the music video, he says "Overall, the "Raging Fire" music video is one of Phillip Phillips' most compelling music videos to date. He is one of those artists that excels with every song that he releases to radio, while simultaneously staying true to himself. It garners an A rating.

=== NHL Awards ===
During the 2014 NHL Awards, a video featuring highlights of the 2013-14 NHL season played with Phillip playing in between shots and wearing numerous jerseys.

== Live performances ==
"Raging Fire" was performed on March 6, 2014, on American Idol. Phillips also performed the song at Shazam Sessions On April 1, Phillips performed the song on Conan on TBS, which broadcast live at the Dallas Majestic Theater in Dallas. On April 22, "Raging Fire" was performed on Ellen. According to Playiga.com by Interscope Geffen A&M music group, Phillips also performed on Good Morning America (ABC) on May 20 and on the Today Show (NBC) on June 27.

Phillips performed the song nearby the Billboard Music Awards on May 19 at the Mandalay Bay Beach

Phillips performed the song with Sam Woolf on the American Idol season 13 finale on May 21, 2014.

Phillips performed the song at The View

== Track listing ==
Digital download

1. "Raging Fire" – 3:45

== Credits and personnel ==
- Phillip Phillips – vocals, songwriter
- Todd Clark – songwriter, composer
- Derek Fuhrmann – songwriter, composer
- Gregg Wattenberg – songwriter, producer, composer

Credits adapted from Musicnotes.com

== Charts ==
=== Weekly charts ===
Chart (2014)	Peak position
Canada Hot 100 (Billboard)	26
US Billboard Hot 100	58
US Adult Alternative Airplay (Billboard)	6
US Adult Contemporary (Billboard)	13
US Adult Pop Airplay (Billboard)	7
US Rock & Alternative Airplay (Billboard)	46

=== Year-end charts ===
Chart (2014)	Position
US Adult Alternative Songs (Billboard)	32
US Adult Contemporary (Billboard)	33
US Adult Top 40 (Billboard)	31

== Release history ==
Region	Date	Format	Label
North America	March 3, 2014	Digital download	Interscope
North America	March 17, 2014	Adult album alternative radio	Interscope
