= Superman (It's Not Easy) =

2001 single by Five for Fighting

- Artwork used for most releases

Single by Five for Fighting

from the album America Town
- Released: April 16, 2001
- Studio: Mad Dog (Burbank, California); EMI (Santa Monica, California); John's living room
- Genre: Soft rock; pop rock
- Length: 3:42
- Label: Aware; Columbia
- Songwriter: John Ondrasik
- Producer: Gregg Wattenberg

Five for Fighting singles chronology
"Easy Tonight" (2000)	"Superman (It's Not Easy)" (2001)	"Easy Tonight" (2002)

Music video
- "Superman (It's Not Easy)" on YouTube

Alternative cover
- Australian artwork

"Superman (It's Not Easy)" is a song written and performed by American singer Five for Fighting. It was released on April 16, 2001, as the second single from his second studio album America Town. Following the September 11 attacks, the song was used to honor the victims, survivors, police, and firefighters involved in the attacks.

The song debuted on the US Billboard Hot 100 chart at number 38 on October 27, 2001, then subsequently peaked at number 14, becoming Five for Fighting's first top-40 hit in the United States. The single was a major hit in Australia and New Zealand, reaching number two on both countries' national charts. It additionally reached the top 20 in Ireland, Italy and Norway. It was nominated for a Grammy Award for Best Pop Performance by a Duo or Group with Vocals at the 44th Grammy Awards in 2002.

== Content ==
The lyrics focus on the iconic hero Superman; specifically, how, in the opinion of the singer, his life as a hero is surprisingly difficult despite his immense power. Ondrasik said the song is about "frustration about the inability to be heard."

== Commercial performance ==
"Superman" first charted on the US Billboard Adult Top 40, debuting at number 37 on May 26, 2001. It was slow to rise up the chart, taking over six months to reach its peak of number one, where it stayed for three weeks in December. It then appeared on the Billboard Triple-A chart in July, peaking at number seven on September 8. On the Billboard Hot 100, the song debuted at number 69 on September 1, 2001, and peaked at number 14 on December 29, giving Five for Fighting his highest- and longest-charting single in the US, staying on the Hot 100 for 35 weeks. The song also appeared on the Billboard Adult Contemporary and Mainstream Top 40 charts, reaching number 15 on the latter chart in December 2001. On the Adult Contemporary chart, the song charted for 87 weeks starting from November 24, 2001, peaking at number two in May 2002; it finished 2002 as the second-most successful adult contemporary song. In November 2005, the song received a gold certification from the Recording Industry Association of America (RIAA) for digital sales exceeding 500,000 copies.

In Canada, "Superman" peaked at number seven on Nielsen BDS's CHR chart and was the 11th-most-played song on Canadian radio in 2002. On New Zealand's RIANZ Singles Chart, the song debuted at number 49 on October 21, 2001, and took 12 weeks to reach its peak of number two on January 27, 2002. It stayed within the top 50 for 27 weeks in total and ended 2002 at number 32 on the RIANZ year-end chart. Recorded Music NZ awarded the song a platinum certification for sales and streaming figures exceeding 30,000 units in November 2022. In Australia, the single debuted at number four on February 17, 2002, and rose to number two on March 3, spending a total of 17 weeks within the ARIA Singles Chart top 50. It was ranked number 24 on Australia's year-end chart and was certified platinum by the Australian Recording Industry Association (ARIA) for shipments exceeding 70,000.

In Europe, "Superman" experienced varying success. On the Italian Singles Chart, it peaked at number 11 for a week in April 2002, while in Norway, it rose to number 12 on the 11th charting period of 2002. In the Netherlands, the song peaked at number 36 on the Dutch Top 40 and number 43 on the Single Top 100. The song stalled outside the top 50 in Belgium's Flanders region, peaking at number four on the Ultratip Bubbling Under ranking. On the UK Singles Chart, the single debuted and peaked at number 48 on May 26, 2002, and charted for three non-consecutive weeks. In Ireland, the song debuted at number 40 on June 13, 2002. Seven weeks later, on July 25, the song ascended to its peak of number five, then spent seven more weeks within the Irish Singles Chart top 30 before dropping out. At the end of the year, the song appeared at number 32 on Ireland's year-end chart.

== Music video ==
The music video was directed by Ramaa Mosley and premiered in June 2001. A scene from this video was filmed at Yonge Street and Richmond Street in Toronto, Ontario. At the end of the song's music video, John Ondrasik lies in bed with his own wife and son.

== Impact ==
Ondrasik was in London during the September 11 attacks, preparing for a concert; the song was beginning to pick up steam in Europe. However, the song grew in popularity in the United States after the attacks, with CBS News writing that "...it became an anthem in the days after 9/11. Its lyrics resonated with people, bringing a sense of raw humanity and comfort to those who needed it most."

== Charts ==
=== Weekly charts ===
Weekly chart performance for "Superman (It's Not Easy)"
Chart (2001–2002)	Peak position
Australia (ARIA)	2
Belgium (Ultratip Bubbling Under Flanders)	4
Canada CHR (Nielsen BDS)	7
Ireland (IRMA)	5
Italy (FIMI)	11
Netherlands (Dutch Top 40)	36
Netherlands (Single Top 100)	43
New Zealand (Recorded Music NZ)	2
Norway (VG-lista)	12
Scotland Singles (OCC)	39
UK Singles (OCC)	48
US Billboard Hot 100	14
US Adult Alternative Airplay (Billboard)	7
US Adult Contemporary (Billboard)	2
US Adult Pop Airplay (Billboard)	1
US Pop Airplay (Billboard)	15

=== Year-end charts ===
2001 year-end chart performance for "Superman (It's Not Easy)"
Chart (2001)	Position
Canada Radio (Nielsen BDS)	92
US Adult Top 40 (Billboard)	16
US Mainstream Top 40 (Billboard)	95
US Triple-A (Billboard)	20

2002 year-end chart performance for "Superman (It's Not Easy)"
Chart (2002)	Position
Australia (ARIA)	24
Canada Radio (Nielsen BDS)	11
Ireland (IRMA)	32
New Zealand (RIANZ)	32
US Billboard Hot 100	46
US Adult Contemporary (Billboard)	2
US Adult Top 40 (Billboard)	10
US Mainstream Top 40 (Billboard)	64

2003 year-end chart performance for "Superman (It's Not Easy)"
Chart (2003)	Position
US Adult Contemporary (Billboard)	14

== Certifications ==
Certifications and sales for "Superman (It's Not Easy)"
Region	Certification	Certified units/sales
Australia (ARIA)	Platinum	70,000^{^}
New Zealand (RMNZ)	Platinum	30,000^{‡}
United States (RIAA)	Gold	500,000^{*}
^{*} Sales figures based on certification alone.^{^} Shipments figures based on certification alone.^{‡} Sales+streaming figures based on certification alone.

== Release history ==
Release dates and formats for "Superman (It's Not Easy)"
Region	Date	Format(s)	Label(s)	Ref.
United States	April 16, 2001	Adult alternative radio	Aware; Columbia	
United States	April 23, 2001	Adult contemporary; hot adult contemporary radio	Aware; Columbia	
United States	April 24, 2001	Alternative radio	Aware; Columbia	
Australia	February 4, 2002	CD	Aware; Columbia	
United Kingdom	May 20, 2002	CD	Aware; Columbia	

== In popular culture and covers ==
"Superman" has been covered multiple times by various artists. The song was covered by shadow musician Catman Cohen in 2005 via CD, How I Want to Live: the Catman Chronicles 2. In his 2010 comedy tour, Conan O'Brien sang a cover of the song by himself before Jim Carrey appeared in a Superman suit to sing a duet with O'Brien. Australian comedy rock trio the Axis of Awesome parodied this song with a new song, "Birdplane". This song turned out to affect the band, as it represented Jordan Raskopoulos and her transgender transition.

The song has also been used in multiple television programs. It was aptly featured in Smallville, a coming-of-age series focused on the adventures of teenage Clark Kent. A cover of the song by Briana Lee was used in the series finale of the television show Code Black.

In 2011, the song was used to honor the memory of hockey player and former Vancouver Canuck, Rick Rypien at Rogers Arena, Vancouver. Rypien died by suicide in the August 2011 after a lengthy battle with depression.
