= NHL Network =

NHL Network may refer to:

- NHL Network (American TV channel)
- NHL Network (Canadian TV channel)
- NHL Network (1975 TV program)

See also

- National Hockey League on television
