= Five for Fighting =

American singer-songwriter

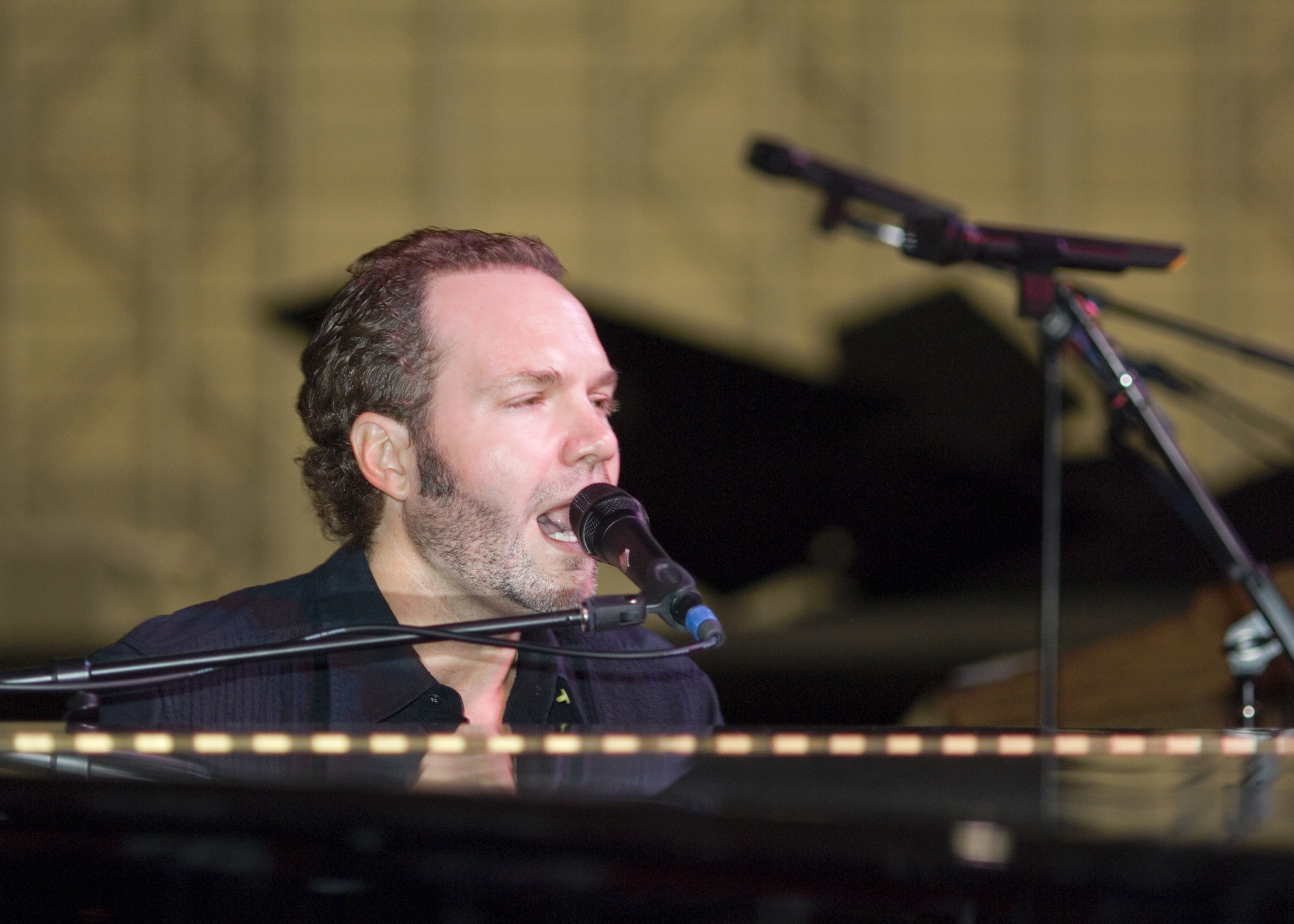
- Ondrasik in 2007

Background information
- Also known as: John Ondrasik
- Born: Vladimir John Ondrasik III; January 7, 1965 (age 61); Los Angeles, California, U.S.
- Education: University of California, Los Angeles (BS)
- Genres: Soft rock; heartland rock; alternative rock; pop rock; Americana; adult contemporary
- Occupations: Singer-songwriter; pianist; record producer; philanthropist
- Instruments: Vocals; piano; guitar; harmonica
- Years active: 1988–present
- Labels: Wind-Up; Aware; Columbia; Nettwerk; EMI
- Member of: John Scott
- Children: 2
- Website: fiveforfighting.com

Vladimir John Ondrasik III (born January 7, 1965), known professionally as Five for Fighting, is an American singer-songwriter and pianist. He is best known for his piano-based soft rock, such as the top 40 hits "Superman (It's Not Easy)" (2001), "100 Years" (2003), and "The Riddle" (2006). He also had a string of moderate hits on the adult contemporary charts in the late 2000s and into the 2010s, including "World" (2006) and "Chances" (2009).

Ondrasik has recorded six studio albums, one EP, and several live albums as Five for Fighting. Ondrasik's song "Superman" was nominated for a Grammy in 2002. The singer has had songs featured in 350 films, TV shows, and advertisements. As of 2025, Five for Fighting's music has over one billion streams.

== Early years ==
Ondrasik was born in Los Angeles, California, a child of a musical family. He is of Slovak descent. His mother was a piano teacher who taught at John F. Kennedy High School in Granada Hills, Los Angeles, where he graduated. He learned the piano as a child. In his teens, he learned to play the guitar and started to write music. While he also learned to sing opera, taught by Ron Anderson, he soon decided that he wanted to be a singer and songwriter.

While in college, Ondrasik continued to pursue music in his spare time. He graduated from UCLA with a degree in applied science and mathematics.

== Career ==
=== Early musical career and John Scott (1988–1995) ===
After graduating from UCLA in 1988, Ondrasik became associated with the glam metal scene. He befriended Whitesnake bassist Rudy Sarzo and later formed a band with Scott St. Clair Sheets, best known for his work with Pat Benatar, called John Scott. Ondrasik later described the band's genre as "pop metal", comparing their sound to Bon Jovi. John Scott signed a management deal in the early 1990s, but any hopes of mainstream success were shattered with the rise of grunge. "We had some good songs and had some interest and were about to do a big management deal and then this little band called Nirvana came out and the whole hair-metal thing blew up," said Ondrasik. Despite this, several John Scott recordings have survived.

Three John Scott songs co-written by Sheets and Ondrasik appeared on a 1997 arena rock album from Sheets' band, St. Clair, which also featured Sarzo. Ondrasik did not perform on the album, but received writing credits for the re-recorded John Scott songs "After the Fire", "Shadow of Myself", and "Turn the Wheel" (a re-written version of "On the Streets Again" by John Scott). Sheets and Ondrasik would collaborate again much later, in 2008, when Ondrasik provided vocals for Sheets' song "Fly Me Away".

After John Scott parted ways, Ondrasik says he then "went back to the piano, where I belonged."

Ondrasik spent the early 1990s playing singer-songwriter gigs around Los Angeles. He signed with an EMI music publisher, Carla Berkowitz, who discovered him in a bar on Melrose and Vine. Ondrasik and Berkowitz later married.

=== Becoming "Five for Fighting" and first album (1995–1999) ===
In 1995, Ondrasik signed with EMI Records. He adopted Five for Fighting as a "band name" that same year at the request of EMI executives, who found Ondrasik's name difficult to pronounce. EMI also had concerns that the male singer-songwriter was "dead" in the mid-1990s. According to Ondrasik, the label "loved" the name Five for Fighting even though it sounded like a "heavy-metal band". "Five for fighting" is an ice hockey expression that means a five-minute major penalty for participating in a fight. Ondrasik is a lifelong fan of the Los Angeles Kings hockey team.

Five for Fighting's first album, Message for Albert, was released by EMI in March 1997. However, EMI Records' American division closed that June. Although the album itself had already been released, there were no singles from Message. "Bella's Birthday Cake" was intended as the lead single, judging by the existence of radio promos and demos featuring the song. The song "Ocean" appears alongside "Bella's Birthday Cake" on some promotional cassettes, suggesting it was viewed as a potential second single.

AllMusic called Message for Albert "intelligent and well-crafted", concluding that it was "a promising debut that sadly lost its shot when EMI spontaneously combusted after the record's release."

After the demise of EMI's American branch, Ondrasik tried to have Message for Albert re-released through Capitol Records or Virgin Records, but was unsuccessful. Five for Fighting left EMI in the aftermath and recorded demos of "Easy Tonight" and "Jainy", both of which were re-recorded for 2000's America Town album. Capitol Records eventually did re-release Message after the success of America Town.

=== Breakthrough and peak commercial success (2000–2006) ===
Aware Records' Mark Cunningham made initial contact with Ondrasik. Cunningham then passed Ondrasik's demos to the label's new A&R Steve Smith. After a discussion with Aware head Gregg Latterman, Smith met with Ondrasik and set up a deal in partnership with Columbia Records.

His second album, America Town, was released on September 26, 2000. In addition to 10 all-new songs, America Town included two re-recorded songs from the ill-fated Message for Albert album ("The Last Great American" and "Love Song"). "Easy Tonight" became the album's lead single in 2000. It received moderate airplay and peaked at number 26 on the Adult Top 40.

The second single, "Superman (It's Not Easy)", was a commercial success, reaching number 14 on the Billboard Hot 100 chart and number 1 on the Adult Top 40. The song became an anthem after the September 11 attacks and Ondrasik performed the song at The Concert for New York City on October 20, 2001. "Superman" was nominated for a Grammy in 2002.

After the success of "Superman", two more songs were released as singles – the title track "America Town" and "Something About You" in 2002 and 2003, respectively – but neither song charted. While America Town did not reach the top 50 of the Billboard 200 chart, the album was certified Platinum in 2004.

His third album, The Battle for Everything, debuted at number 20 on Billboard 200 chart in February 2004. Some versions of the album were paired with a bonus CD, a five-song EP called 2 + 2 Makes 5. Battle included the single "100 Years", which reached number one on the Billboard Adult Contemporary chart and stayed at number one for 12 non-consecutive weeks. "Devil in the Wishing Well" was the album's second single, reaching number 23 on the Adult Top 40. A third single, a cover of "Silent Night" from the 2 + 2 Makes 5 EP, reached number 2 on the US Adult Contemporary charts.

The Battle for Everything was certified Platinum by the RIAA, making it Five for Fighting's second straight Platinum-selling album. It received mixed reviews from critics, with AllMusic praising the record's "nice craftsmanship" and noting that it was "one of the more interesting, detailed" records in its genre. However, AllMusic was critical of the "pompous narcissism" of the lyrics, calling Ondrasik "deadly serious". Todd Goldstein of PopMatters also criticized the album's "pomposity", but enjoyed "Angels and Girlfriends" for its "unexpected chord changes" and "uncharacteristically quirky" lyrics. He singled out "The Taste" for its surprising energy, writing that during "the only pure guitar-rocking song among the twelve midtempo ballads, John Ondrasik screams. It's a raucous, Howlin' Pelle Almqvist moment of sheer unselfconscious exuberance." Another writer said Ondrasik seemed like a "contradictory figure" for his blend of romanticism and irreverence on The Battle for Everything: "There's '100 Years,' the first single, a meditation on the poetry of time passing. But then there's 'The Taste,' whose delicate opening gets pulverized by slashing electric guitar and a raw, screaming vocal." According to Ondrasik, when recording Battle, he and producer Bill Bottrell "were ambitious to the point of absurdity. If we wanted drama, we'd get a thirty-piece orchestra. If we wanted a rock edge, we went after it with reckless abandonment."

=== Continued mainstream success (2006–2009) ===
Two years later, the album Two Lights was released; this became his first career top 10 album, debuting at number eight on the Billboard 200 chart in August 2006. Its first single, "The Riddle", became Ondrasik's third career top 40 hit on the Billboard Hot 100 chart, peaking at number 40. It reached number three on the AC charts and number seven on the Hot AC charts. The second single, "World", reached number 14 on Hot AC charts, and the music video has been used to raise funds for various charities and as a theme for NASA's International Space Station (see Philanthropy below).

Five for Fighting released three live albums in 2007: Rhapsody Originals in January, iTunes Exclusive in June, and Back Country in October.

His fifth studio album, titled Slice, was released on October 13, 2009, and appeared on the iTunes top 10 albums on the first day. The album was produced by Gregg Wattenberg ("Superman", "100 Years"). Academy Award-winning composer Stephen Schwartz, who penned the songs for musicals such as Wicked, Godspell and Pippin, co-wrote the title track, as well as the track "Above the Timberline". On July 21, 2009, the first single from Slice, called "Chances", was released for digital download. "Chances" was featured during the end credits of the hit film The Blind Side. "Chances" reached number 11 on the Hot AC radio chart.

=== Career downturn and new record label (2010–2013) ===
By the early 2010s, Five for Fighting's "commercial success was in the rearview" and Ondrasik was not able to "reclaim his pop star status" from the 2000s. Five for Fighting and Columbia Records parted ways in 2010 after ten years. In a later Tedx Talk about songwriting, Ondrasik revealed that he was "dropped" from Columbia after one of his singles, "Slice", turned out not to be a hit. He even wondered whether he was "done" with the music industry. However, Wind-up Records signed Five for Fighting and re-released the Slice album.

Shortly after Five for Fighting left Columbia, two compilation albums were released. One was a best of album called The Very Best of Five for Fighting. It was released in 2011 and featured 14 songs in chronological order of their recording, beginning with "Bella's Birthday Cake" from 1997 and ending with 2010's "Slice". The other compilation album, also from 2011, was a bundle of Five for Fighting's two Platinum-selling albums, America Town and The Battle for Everything.

Five for Fighting's sixth studio album, Bookmarks, was released through Wind-up and Aware Records in 2013, peaking at number 54 on the Billboard 200. "What If" was the album's lead single and it reached number 29 and number 28 on the Adult Top 40 and Adult Contemporary charts, respectively. Even though "What If" charted, Ondrasik says he realized that the hit singles phase of his career was coming to an end while promoting the song in 2013.

=== Changing the field of play (2014–2020) ===
As Ondrasik entered his fifties, he decided to "change the field of play" rather than continuing to pursue chart position and record sales: "I just can't be doing it the same way I've always done it." Much of his activity in these years focused on television. Ondrasik and Stephen Schwartz sold a TV show called Harmony to ABC in 2017. Five for Fighting also placed several songs in TV shows, such as "All for One" on the 100th episode of Hawaii Five-0, "100 Years" in final scene of the final episode of the TV series JAG, and "Born to Win" on American Ninja Warrior. In 2020, Ondrasik re-recorded an unplugged version of "All for One" that was featured in the series finale of Hawaii Five-0.

Most prominently, Ondrasik was the featured artist in season three of the CBS drama Code Black, covering Gary Go's "Open Arms" in episode one. He also appears on screen performing the song. Ondrasik's cover of "Open Arms" appeared on the Billboard's "Top TV songs" chart in April 2017, which lists the ten most popular songs on TV each month. Ondrasik's other songs for Code Black included "Hero" and "This Fire", while his 2000 song "Superman (It's Not Easy)" was performed by Briana Lee in the season three finale.

In 2018, Ondrasik recorded a song entitled "Song For The Innocents" for the end credits of the film Gosnell: The Trial of America's Biggest Serial Killer.

Some of Five for Fighting's notable live performances in this era included the Lincoln Center Series, American Songbook, in February 2017, the 2017 National Memorial Day Concert and parade, and a TV special called Christmas Under the Stars.

=== Recent activity (2021–present) ===
In the 2020s, Ondrasik released a trio of songs about current geopolitical events. The first of these was "Blood on My Hands", a 2021 song critical of the withdrawal of American troops from Afghanistan. The song prompted media discussion over censorship in music following YouTube's banning and subsequent restoration of the song's graphic music video on its platform.

In March 2022, Ondrasik released "Can One Man Save the World?" about the Russian invasion of Ukraine, which he then performed on July 9, 2022, in Kyiv with the Ukrainian Orchestra. Ondrasik said:

I was honored to perform my new Ukraine tribute song Can One Man Save the World? with the Ukrainian Orchestra in the ruins of the Antonov Airport—in front of the Ukrainians' beloved Mriya, the world’s largest cargo plane that Russia destroyed at the outset of the war. In sharing this musical collaboration on such hallowed ground, I saw firsthand the fortitude and grace of the Ukrainian people, who whether playing a violin or driving a tank, will not be deterred by Putin's atrocities and aggressions.

On January 18, 2024, Ondrasik released "OK" in response to the October 7, 2023 attack on Israel by Hamas and the subsequent global rise in antisemitism. He referred to the song as "a call to action to stand for good vs. evil, right vs. wrong, and call evil by name without 'context' or equivocation".

In 2025, Ondrasik performed on season six of The Song (episode "Five for Fighting"), accompanied by a string quartet. Later that year, the performances were released as a live EP.

=== Musical style and influences ===
Ondrasik has been variously compared to other piano singer-songwriters like Elton John, Billy Joel, Dave Matthews, and Ben Folds, albeit "while still maintaining a harder rock edge exclusive to Five For Fighting." His more heartland rock-oriented tracks have been compared to those of Bruce Springsteen and Tom Petty. Ondrasik lists Queen (and Freddie Mercury in particular), Steve Perry, Stevie Wonder, Elton John, Billy Joel, and Prince among his musical influences.

Ondrasik makes heavy use of falsetto vocals in his music, with Variety describing this as "a pleasant two-tone voice -- a tenor for setting up a situation and a higher register for driving a point home". PopMatters wrote that Ondrasik sings in a "Vedder-lite croon", with an "instantly recognizable falsetto", also referring to it as "that kickass falsetto", while AllMusic compared his voice to "Eddie Vedder singing a lullaby." Ondrasik's earliest surviving recordings, as the singer in John Scott, feature louder and raspier vocals, with Consequence writing that he was "pretty convincing as a metal frontman."

In addition to piano, Ondrasik plays the harmonica and acoustic guitar. He also plays electric guitar on studio recordings of some songs. While Five for Fighting's singles prominently feature piano, his early albums contain songs with traditional hard rock influences ("Happy" on Message for Albert, "Boat Parade" on America Town, "The Taste" on The Battle for Everything, and others). Grunge influences can also be heard in earlier albums, such as in "Wise Man" on Message for Albert, "Michael Jordan" on America Town, and a non-album song called "Big Cities". Accordingly, Ondrasik has acknowledged Nirvana as one of his influences.

On his style at the turn of the millennium, when "Superman" became his first mainstream hit, Ondrasik said, "I kind of fancy myself as a rocker and a rock guy and here was this ballad." Even though the song was softer than his style at the time, Ondrasik is "so grateful that I had that chance to be heard with that song. It will always be my firstborn." Five for Fighting's style became softer in the 2000s, with AllMusic calling this era of Five for Fighting an "adult alternative mother-ship" and "full-blown soft rock".

Five for Fighting's live performances take a variety of forms: sometimes Ondrasik appears alone, switching between acoustic guitar and piano. Five for Fighting sometimes appears with touring musicians on bass, electric guitar, and drums. Five for Fighting also began playing orchestral shows in the early 2010s, often accompanied by a string quartet; Ondrasik has also appeared with the backing of full symphony orchestras for these shows. He often covers songs like "American Pie", "Rocket Man", "Message in a Bottle", and "Bohemian Rhapsody" at the end of live performances. Five for Fighting has released a steady stream of live recordings since 2007, including seven live albums and EPs.

=== Professional speaking ===
In 2012, Ondrasik became active on the public speaking circuit. Presenting on themes of creativity, entrepreneurship, and collaboration, Ondrasik uses his music, life as a musician, and working in the family business to highlight his message. He has presented at TEDx, The Salk Institute, American Cancer Society, and Virgin Unite amongst others.

=== Legacy and awards ===
Referring to Five for Fighting's success, AllMusic called Ondrasik "one of contemporary pop music's most enduring balladeers". In 2025, The Plain Dealer called Five for Fighting "a defining voice in American pop rock". Business Insider has referred to the artist as a two-hit wonder for the songs "Superman (It's Not Easy)" and "100 Years".

Five for Fighting has released two Platinum-selling albums, America Town and The Battle for Everything, and received one Grammy nomination and one AMA nomination.

Five for Fighting Nominations
Year	Awarding Body	Nominee/work	Award	Result
2002	Grammy Awards	"Superman (It's Not Easy)"	Best Pop Performance By A Duo Or Group With Vocal	Nominated
2003	American Music Awards	Five for Fighting	Favorite Adult Contemporary Artist	Nominated

== Philanthropy ==
In the spring of 2007, Ondrasik created his first video charity website, launching his whatkindofworlddoyouwant.com website. The site allowed fans to upload videos answering the central question, "What Kind of World Do You Want?" (taken from his hit song "World"). The site raised over $250,000 for Augie's Quest, Autism Speaks, Fisher House Foundation, Save the Children, and Operation Homefront.

Ondrasik, under the auspices of the United Service Organizations (USO), performed for service members on a USO/Armed Forces Entertainment tour of Guantánamo Bay and other bases in Cuba in February and March 2007. He followed up with another USO tour in November 2007 of Japan, Guam and Hawaii. "I am struck by the sacrifices the troops and their families make for our way of life and I felt it was important to show my support", says Ondrasik.

In November 2007, Ondrasik coordinated the release of 13 free songs for US military members called CD for the Troops. There have been five CDs for the troops, and over one million copies have been given away. The songs donated included tracks from Billy Joel, Jewel and Sarah McLachlan. Subsequent volumes became available in 2008 (including songs by Gretchen Wilson, Keith Urban and Trace Adkins), 2009 (an album of comedy tracks with material from comedians such as Chris Rock, Ray Romano and Adam Sandler), 2010 (featuring songs by Matchbox 20, Brandi Carlile, Ingrid Michaelson, and Gavin DeGraw), and 2011 (artists including Sara Bareilles, Mayday Parade and REO Speedwagon).

Ondrasik has also performed on the annual Jerry Lewis MDA Labor Day Telethon and has done various events for the Muscular Dystrophy Association and Augie's Quest, raising awareness and funds for ALS (Lou Gehrig's disease).

In 2008, he got involved in the musical movement of spreading awareness about current slavery and human trafficking by performing a live version of "World" for the rockumentary, Call + Response.

The song "What If" was used in the tenth-anniversary campaign of Richard Branson's non-profit, Virgin Unite.

The singer received a special fatherhood award from the National Fatherhood Initiative's 2009 Military Fatherhood Award Ceremony. He received the International SPA Association's Humanitarian Award in 2016.

In 2022 the singer launched a docu-series called Meet the Heroes interviewing Americans involved with the Afghan withdrawal. The first episode featured Mike Waltz.

In February 2022 Ondrasik joined Tom Morello, Victoria Williams, Beth Hart, and others on the song "God Help Us Now" about Afghan girls suffering in Afghanistan.

In 2024, Ondrasik appeared at an American Jewish Committee press conference at UCLA Hillel, where he expressed support for Jewish students across the nation. In June 2025, Ondrasik dedicated his 2001 hit, "Superman", which had previously been adopted as an anthem for the survivors the September 11 attacks, to the Israeli hostages held in Gaza by Hamas.

== Personal life ==
Ondrasik's year of birth has been subject to some confusion, with Encyclopedia.com listing his birth year as 1968 instead of 1965. A 2001 Los Angeles Times article refers to him being 33 at the time rather than 36. A March 2002 interview from the Pittsburgh Post-Gazette gives his age as 33 at the time rather than 37. However, Ondrasik himself referred to recently turning 55 during 2020, clearly implying that 1965 is his correct year of birth.

== Discography ==
=== Studio albums ===
Year	Album details	Peak chart positions								Sales	Certifications
Year	Album details	US	US Rock	AUS	CAN	IRE	NOR	NZ	UK	Sales	Certifications
Message for Albert	Release date: March 11, 1997; Label: EMI; Format: CD	—	—	—	—	—	—	—	—		
America Town	Release date: September 26, 2000; Label: Aware, Columbia; Format: CD	54	—	30	67	72	20	24	169	US: 966,000	RIAA: Platinum; MC: Gold
The Battle for Everything	Release date: February 3, 2004; Label: Aware, Columbia; Format: CD	20	—	73	33	—	—	—	—	US: 958,000	RIAA: Platinum
Two Lights	Release date: August 1, 2006; Label: Aware, Columbia; Format: CD, digital download	8	3	—	30	—	—	—	—	US: 287,000	
Slice	Release date: October 13, 2009; Label: Aware, Wind-up; Format: CD, digital download	34	15	—	95	—	—	—	—		
Bookmarks	Release date: September 17, 2013; Label: Aware, Wind-up; Format: CD, digital download, vinyl	54	—	—	—	—	—	—	—		
"—" denotes releases that did not chart

=== Live albums ===
Title	Album details
Rhapsody Originals	Release date: January 30, 2007; Label: Aware, Columbia; Format: Digital download
Live Session EP: iTunes Exclusive	Release date: June 19, 2007; Label: Aware, Columbia; Format: Digital download
Back Country	Release date: October 30, 2007; Label: Aware, Columbia; Format: CD, DVD, digital download
Live in Boston (Live Nation Studios)	Release date: February 23, 2010; Label: Aware; Format: Digital download
Christmas Under the Stars	Release date: December 10, 2017; Label: Self-released; Format: CD, digital download
Live with String Quartet	Release date: October 12, 2018; Label: Self-released; Format: CD, DVD, digital download
Live at The Song	Release date: July 18, 2025; Label: BMG; Format: Digital download

=== Compilation albums ===
Title	Album details
Playlist: The Very Best of Five for Fighting	Release date: January 25, 2011; Label: Sony Legacy; Format: CD, digital download
X2: America Town/The Battle for Everything	Release date: August 29, 2011; Label: Sony; Format: CD

=== EP ===
Title	EP details
2 + 2 Makes 5	Release date: November 9, 2004; Label: Aware, Columbia; Format: CD, digital download; Bundled with some versions of The Battle for Everything

=== Singles ===
Year	Title	Peak chart positions										Certifications	Album
Year	Title	US	US Adult	US AC	US Pop	AUS	IRE	NL	NZ	NOR	UK	Certifications	Album
2000	"Easy Tonight"	—	26	—	—	—	—	88	24	—	—		America Town
2001	"Superman (It's Not Easy)"	14	1	2	15	2	5	43	2	12	48	RIAA: Gold; ARIA: Platinum; RMNZ: Platinum	America Town
2002	"Easy Tonight" (re-release)	—	18	—	—	—	—	—	20	—	—		America Town
2002	"America Town"	—	—	—	—	—	—	—	—	—	—		America Town
2003	"Something About You"	—	—	—	—	—	—	—	—	—	—		America Town
2003	"100 Years"	28	3	1	40	32	—	—	32	—	—	RIAA: Platinum; RMNZ: Gold	The Battle for Everything
2004	"The Devil in the Wishing Well"	—	23	—	—	—	—	—	—	—	—		The Battle for Everything
2004	"Silent Night"	—	—	2	—	—	—	—	—	—	—		The Battle for Everything
2005	"If God Made You"	—	—	20	—	—	—	—	—	—	—		The Battle for Everything
2006	"The Riddle"	40	8	4	—	—	—	—	—	—	—		Two Lights
2006	"World"	—	14	—	—	—	—	—	—	—	—		Two Lights
2007	"I Just Love You"	—	—	24	—	—	—	—	—	—	—		Two Lights
2009	"Chances"	83	14	8	—	—	—	—	—	—	—		Slice
2010	"Slice"	—	33	11	—	—	—	—	—	—	—		Slice
2013	"What If"	—	29	28	—	—	—	—	—	—	—		Bookmarks
2016	"Born to Win"	—	—	—	—	—	—	—	—	—	—		Non-album single
2017	"Christmas Where You Are" (featuring Jim Brickman)	—	—	11	—	—	—	—	—	—	—		Christmas Under the Stars
2018	"Song for the Innocents"	—	—	—	—	—	—	—	—	—	—		Non-album singles
2021	"Blood on My Hands"	—	—	—	—	—	—	—	—	—	—		Non-album singles
2022	"Can One Man Save the World"	—	—	—	—	—	—	—	—	—	—		Non-album singles
2024	"OK"	—	—	—	—	—	—	—	—	—	—		Non-album singles
"—" denotes releases that did not chart

=== Music videos ===
Year	Video	Director
2001	"Superman (It's Not Easy)"	Ramaa Mosley
2002	"Easy Tonight"	Nancy Bardawil
2004	"100 Years"	Trey Fanjoy
2004	"The Devil in the Wishing Well"	Elliott Lester
2006	"The Riddle"	Vem
2006	"World"	Todd Strauss-Schulson
2009	"Chances"	Steven Drypolcher
2013	"What If"	Roman White
2022	"Can One Man Save the World"	Hollywood Heard
2024	"OK"	
