= Phillip Phillips discography =

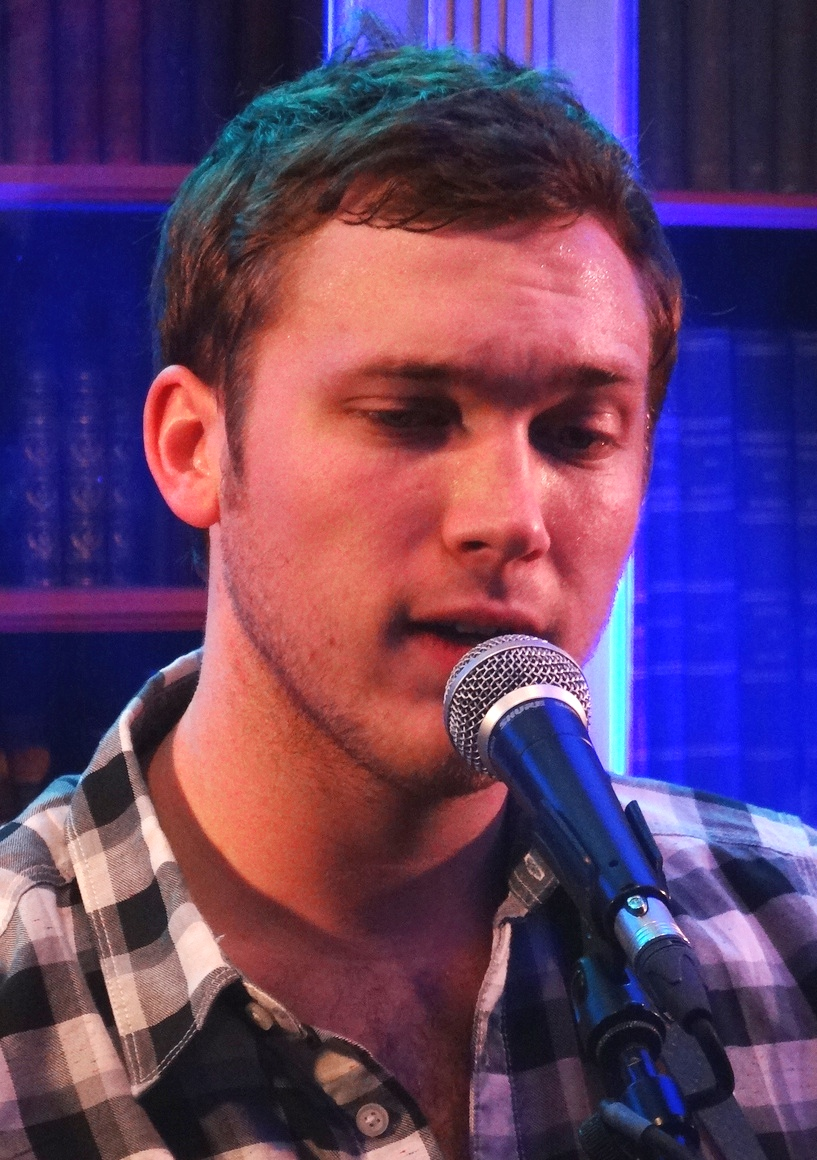
- Phillip Phillips in Paris, March 2013
- Studio albums: 4
- Extended plays: 3
- Compilation albums: 1
- Singles: 11
- Music videos: 7

American rock singer Phillip Phillips has released four studio albums, one compilation album, three extended plays, ten singles, and seven music videos. He won the eleventh season of American Idol in 2012, earning a recording contract with Interscope Records. His winner's single, "Home", became the highest selling single from the Idol in the show's history, with 5.4 million in sales in the United States alone as of 2015.

Two compilations of his performances from American Idol were released: Phillip Phillips: Journey to the Finale and American Idol Season 11 Highlights. His debut studio album, The World from the Side of the Moon, was released on November 19, 2012, and debuted at number 4 on the Billboard 200 with 169,000 copies sold. It was certified Gold in the US in January 2013 and Platinum in August 2013. Phillips's second single, "Gone, Gone, Gone" peaked within the top 40 and became his second consecutive number one on the Adult Contemporary chart. The song was certified Double Platinum in August 2013. The World from the Side of the Moon stayed on the Billboard 200 for 61 weeks.

In 2014, Phillips released "Raging Fire" as the lead single for his second studio album. The song became a top 10 hit on the Adult Pop Songs chart. Behind the Light was released in May 2014 and peaked at number 7 on both the Canadian and American album charts. The album's second single was "Unpack Your Heart". Phillips returned with his third studio album, Collateral, in 2018. The album debuted at number 141 on the Billboard 200 and its lead single, "Miles" peaked at number 15 on the Billboard HAC Chart.

In the United States, Phillips has sold 7.5 million digital singles. He has also sold 2.7 million albums, including 'album streaming equivalent units'. He has 560 million streams on Spotify and 1.2 billion streams on Pandora.

== Albums ==
=== Studio albums ===
Title	Details	Peak chart positions						Sales	Certifications
Title	Details	US	US Rock	AUS	CAN	NZ	UK	Sales	Certifications
The World from the Side of the Moon	Released: November 19, 2012; Label: Interscope; Formats: CD, digital download	4	1	59	6	32	58	US: 1,033,000	RIAA: Platinum; MC: Platinum; RMNZ: Platinum
Behind the Light	Released: May 19, 2014; Label: Interscope; Formats: CD. digital download	7	—	—	7	24	—	US: 123,000	
Collateral	Released: January 19, 2018; Label: Interscope; Formats: CD, LP, digital download	141	—	—	—	—	—		
Drift Back	Released: June 9, 2023; Label: Phil Phil Music; Formats: CD, LP, digital download	—	—	—	—	—	—		
"—" denotes a recording that did not chart or was not released in that territory.

=== Compilation albums ===
Title	Details	Peak chart positions		Sales
Title	Details	US	US Rock	Sales
Phillip Phillips: Journey to the Finale	Released: May 23, 2012; Label: 19; Formats: digital download	11	4	US: 45,000

== Extended plays ==
Title	Details	Peak chart positions			Sales
Title	Details	US	US Rock	CAN	Sales
American Idol Season 11 Highlights	Released: July 3, 2012; Label: 19; Formats: CD	25	5	67	US: 82,000
iTunes Session	Released: October 8, 2013; Label: 19; Formats: Digital download	148	—	—	
Live EP	Released: November 19, 2013; Label: Interscope; Formats: CD, Digital download	—	—	—	
"—" denotes a recording that did not chart or was not released in that territory.

== Singles ==
Year	Single	Peak chart positions										Sales	Certifications	Album
Year	Single	US	US AAA	US Adult	US AC	AUS	CAN	JPN	NLD	NZ	UK	Sales	Certifications	Album
2012	"Home"	6	1	1	1	56	6	70	76	28	60	US: 5,400,000	RIAA: 4× Platinum; MC: 4× Platinum; RMNZ: Platinum	The World from the Side of the Moon
2013	"Gone, Gone, Gone"	24	1	3	1	—	28	24	—	—	—	US: 2,000,000	RIAA: Platinum; BPI: Silver; MC: Platinum; RMNZ: Platinum	The World from the Side of the Moon
2013	"Where We Came From"	—	17	—	—	—	—	—	—	—	—			The World from the Side of the Moon
2014	"Raging Fire"	58	6	7	13	—	26	—	—	—	—	US: 293,000		Behind the Light
2014	"Unpack Your Heart"	—	19	33	—	—	—	—	—	—	—			Behind the Light
2017	"Miles"	—	23	15	—	—	—	—	—	—	—			Collateral
2018	"Into the Wild"	—	34	—	—	—	—	—	—	—	—			Collateral
2019	"Bring It On Home" (with American Authors and Maddie Poppe)	—	—	34	—	—	—	—	—	—	—			Seasons
2021	"Hold on to Your Love" (with Walk Off the Earth)	—	—	—	—	—	—	—	—	—	—			Non-album single
2022	"Love Like That"	—	—	12	—	—	—	—	—	—	—			Drift Back
2023	"Dancing with Your Shadows"	—	38	12	29	—	—	—	—	—	—			Drift Back
2026	"Homesick"	—	—	27	—	—	—	—	—	—	—			Non-album single
"—" denotes a recording that did not chart or was not released in that territory.

== Other charted songs ==
Year	Song	Peak positions						Sales	Album
Year	Song	US	US Bubbling	US Digital	US Rock	US Rock Digital	CAN	Sales	Album
2012	"We've Got Tonight"	97	—	41	—	8	70	US: 58,000	American Idol - Top 3 - Season 11
2012	"Volcano"	—	9	54	—	9	84	US: 49,000	American Idol - Top 4 - Season 11
2012	"Stand by Me"	—	24	—	—	15	—	US: 24,000	American Idol - Season Finale - Season 11 - EP
2012	"Beggin'"	—	—	—	—	20	—	US: 20,000	American Idol - Top 3 - Season 11
2012	"Movin' Out (Anthony's Song)"	—	—	—	—	25	—	US: 15,000	American Idol - Season Finale - Season 11 - EP
2012	"U Got It Bad"	—	—	—	—	27	—	US: 15,000	American Idol - Top 7 - Season 11
2012	"Have You Ever Seen the Rain?"	—	—	—	—	32	—	US: 12,000	American Idol - Top 4 - Season 11
2012	"Disease"	—	—	—	—	35	—	US: 11,000	American Idol - Top 3 - Season 11
2012	"Fat Bottomed Girls"	—	—	—	—	47	—		American Idol - Top 6 - Season 11
2012	"Man on the Moon"	—	—	—	43	—	—		The World from the Side of the Moon
"—" denotes the single failed to chart or not relevant to the chart.

== Music videos ==
List of music videos, showing year released and director
Title	Year	Director	Ref.
"Home"	2012	Joseph Toman	
"Gone, Gone, Gone"	2013	Joseph Toman	
"Where We Came From"	2013	Cameron Duddy	
"Raging Fire"	2014	Ethan Lader	
"Unpack Your Heart"	2014	Petros Papahadjopoulos	
"Magnetic"	2018	Unknown	
"Love Like That"	2022	Unknown	
