= American Idol compilation series =

The studio albums in the American Idol compilation series are compilations of songs by American Idol contestants normally released every year towards the end of the season or after the season has ended. For the first five seasons, the albums consist of cover songs from all the finalists of the season, and is released as CDs before the last episode by RCA Records. After season 5, such compilations were released only sporadically. Compilations for individual contestants were released digitally starting season 6. No compilations were released in season 7.

Starting season 10, compilation albums are released for sales on iTunes straight after the contestants' performances during the season. Sales figures are not released during the season for these album so all numbers are for sales after the season is over.

== Albums ==
=== Season 1 ===
Year	Album title	Chart positions	Sales
2002	American Idol: Greatest Moments	4 (Billboard 200)	643,000

After Idol's debut season, the top four finalists (Kelly Clarkson, Justin Guarini, Nikki McKibbin, Tamyra Gray) each recorded a version of the song in the event that they won; but only the winner (Clarkson) released it as a single. The single was included in Clarkson's debut album Thankful.

=== Season 2 ===
In addition to the compilation album by season 2 contestants, a Christmas album American Idol: The Great Holiday Classics was released later in the year featuring recordings of Christmas songs by contestants from both season 1 and season 2. Both compilation albums were certified gold.

Year	Album title	Chart positions	Sales
2003	American Idol Season 2: All-Time Classic American Love Songs	2 (Billboard 200)	648,000.
2003	American Idol: The Great Holiday Classics	28 (Billboard 200)	

After season two, the winner (Ruben Studdard) and runner-up (Clay Aiken) each released simultaneously a single containing two songs of one original and one cover. The originals are "This is the Night" (Aiken) and "Flying Without Wings" (Studdard); and the covers are "Bridge Over Troubled Water" (Aiken) and "Superstar" (Studdard)

=== Season 3 ===
Year	Album title	Chart positions	Sales
2004	American Idol Season 3: Greatest Soul Classics	10 (Billboard 200)	266,000

After season three, the winner (Fantasia Barrino) and runner-up (Diana DeGarmo) each released a single containing three songs of which one was a rendition of "I Believe." Barrino's debut album, Free Yourself, included "I Believe" and "Summertime." DeGarmo's debut album, Blue Skies, included "Dreams" and "Don't Cry Out Loud."

=== Season 4 ===
Year	Album title	Chart positions	Sales
2005	American Idol Season 4: The Showstoppers	6 (Billboard 200)	332,000

After season four, the winner (Carrie Underwood) and runner-up (Bo Bice) each released a single for "Inside Your Heaven" and which included one cover song from the show, "Independence Day" (Underwood, also on Showstoppers) and "Vehicle" (Bice). Underwood's debut album Some Hearts also included "Inside Your Heaven" and achieved 7 times Platinum certification.

=== Season 5 ===
Year	Album title	Chart Position	Sales
2006	American Idol Season 5: Encores	3 (Billboard 200)	381,075

After season 5, winner Taylor Hicks and runner-up Katharine McPhee each released a single with an original song and a cover rendition. The original songs are "Do I Make You Proud" (Hicks) and "My Destiny" (McPhee). The covers are "Takin' It to the Streets" (Hicks) and "Over the Rainbow" (McPhee, renamed to "Somewhere over the Rainbow").

=== Season 6 ===
For the first time, the compilation album was made available as digital downloads only. Compilations of individual finalist's performances were also released. On the day after the season six finale, the winner Jordin Sparks and runner-up Blake Lewis released 5-song EPs exclusively to iTunes. Sparks's contained the winner's single, "This Is My Now", as well as four songs she performed on Idol: "I (Who Have Nothing)", "A Broken Wing", "To Love Somebody" and "Wishing on a Star". Lewis's EP did not contain "This Is My Now", but instead all the songs on the EP were songs he performed on the show: "You Give Love a Bad Name", "Time Of The Season", "I Need To Know", "Love Song" and "When The Stars Go Blue". Compilations for other contestants were released to iTunes later a few weeks later, and it was also possible to download all the recordings this season as a collector's edition.

Year	Album title	Chart positions	Sales
2007	American Idol Season 6: Greatest Hits		
2007	Jordin Sparks EP	2 (Digital Albums)	49,000
2007	Blake Lewis EP	3 (Digital Albums)	46,000
2007	Melinda Doolittle EP		3,400
2007	Chris Richardson EP		900
2007	LaKisha Jones EP		700
2007	Sanjaya Malakar EP		600
2007	Phil Stacey EP		500
2007	Haley Scarnato EP		100

Both Jordin and Blake also released several other songs as singles. These studio-recorded tunes are available both on iTunes and americanidol.com. For Jordin Sparks, these singles were "If We Hold on Together", "You'll Never Walk Alone", "Rhythm is Gonna Get You", "On a Clear Day", and "Hey Baby". For Blake Lewis, these singles were "You Should Be Dancing", "Mack the Knife", "You Keep Me Hangin' On", "Imagine", and "This Love".

=== Season 8 ===
After season 8, an album was released exclusively to Wal-Mart which contained songs from the show from various top ten finalists. The album included both Kris Allen's and Adam Lambert's version of "No Boundaries". Another Wal-Mart exclusive a 5-track EP was also later released with songs from the Top 4 finalists: Kris Allen and Danny Gokey's Renegade, Allison Iraheta and Adam Lambert's Slow Ride, as well as Adam's Whole Lotta Love, Danny's What Hurts the Most and Kris' Ain't No Sunshine. On iTunes, digital albums of recordings from the two finalists were released.

Year	Album title	Chart positions	Sales
2009	American Idol Season 8	34 (Billboard 200)	77,616
2009	American Idol Season 8: The 5 Song EP	17 (Billboard 200)	57,176
2009	Kris Allen, Season 8 Favorite Performances	50 (Billboard 200)	16,000
2009	Adam Lambert, Season 8 Favorite Performances	33 (Billboard 200)	37,514

=== Season 9 ===
Year	Album title	Chart positions	Sales
2010	American Idol Season 9	77 (Billboard 200)	21,000
2010	Lee DeWyze, Season 9 Favorite Performances	9 (Heatseekers Albums)	5,000
2010	Crystal Bowersox, Season 9 Favorite Performances	6 (Heatseekers Albums)	5,000

=== Season 10 ===
In this season compilation albums of studio recordings of all contestants' songs were released digitally on iTunes after the performances every week apart from top 3 and top 2. After the top 2 performances, compilations of 14 selected songs from the season by each of the two finalists were released on iTunes and in other retailers. Special five-song EPs from each of the Top 4 finalist were released for sale in Wal-Mart on June 28, 2011.

Year	Album title	Chart positions	Sales
2011	American Idol Top 13 Season 10		
2011	American Idol Top 12 Season 10		
2011	American Idol Top 11 Season 10		
2011	American Idol Top 11 Redux Season 10		
2011	American Idol Top 9 Season 10	9 (iTunes top albums)	
2011	American Idol Top 8 Season 10		
2011	American Idol Top 7 Season 10		
2011	American Idol Top 6 Season 10		
2011	American Idol Top 5 Season 10		
2011	American Idol Top 4 Season 10		
2011	American Idol Season 10: Lauren Alaina	42 (Billboard 200)	17,000
2011	American Idol Season 10: Scotty McCreery	12 (Billboard 200)	42,000
2011	American Idol Season 10 Highlights EP: James Durbin	31 (Billboard 200)	71,000
2011	American Idol Season 10 Highlights EP: Haley Reinhart	37 (Billboard 200)	59,000
2011	American Idol Season 10 Highlights EP: Lauren Alaina	24 (Billboard 200)	85,000
2011	American Idol Season 10 Highlights EP: Scotty McCreery	10 (Billboard 200)	201,000

=== Season 11 ===
In this season compilation albums of studio recordings of all contestants' songs were released digitally to iTunes after the performances every week. After the Top 2 performances, compilations of 11 selected songs from the season by each of the two finalists were released. A compilation album by the Top 10 finalists and an EP from each of the Top 5 finalists was released for sale in Wal-Mart on July 3, 2012, and the Phillip Phillips' EP was released to other retailers on July 17, 2012, with one different track.

Year	Album title	Chart positions	Sales
2012	American Idol - Top 13 Season 11		
2012	American Idol Top 12 Season 11		
2012	American Idol: Top 10 - Season 11		
2012	American Idol, Season 11 - Top 9		
2012	American Idol Top 8 - Season 11		
2012	American Idol Top 7 – Season 11		
2012	American Idol Top 7 Now (New Millennium) - Season 11		
2012	American Idol Top 7 Then (Old Soul) - Season 11		
2012	American Idol Top 6: Music of Queen - Season 11		
2012	American Idol Top 6: Contestant's Choice - Season 11		
2012	American Idol - Songs of the Top 5 - Season 11		
2012	American Idol - Top 4 - Season 11		
2012	American Idol - Top 3 - Season 11		
2012	American Idol - Season Finale - Season 11	21 (Billboard 200)	18,000
2012	Jessica Sanchez: Journey to the Finale	126 (Billboard 200)	6,000
2012	Phillip Phillips: Journey to the Finale	11 (Billboard 200)	45,000
2012	American Idol Season 11 Duets and Trios Highlights	161 (Top Current Album)	3,000
2012	American Idol Season 11 Top 10 Highlights	127 (Billboard 200)	4,000
2012	American Idol Season 11 Highlights: Skylar Laine	64 (Billboard 200)	33,000
2012	American Idol Season 11 Highlights: Hollie Cavanagh	176 (Billboard 200)	13,000
2012	American Idol Season 11 Highlights: Joshua Ledet	57 (Billboard 200)	30,000
2012	American Idol Season 11 Highlights: Jessica Sanchez	77 (Billboard 200)	15,000
2012	American Idol Season 11 Highlights: Phillip Phillips	25 (Billboard 200)	82,000

=== Season 12 ===
In this season compilation albums of studio recordings of all contestants' songs were released digitally to iTunes after the performances every week.

Year	Album title	Chart positions	Sales
2013	American Idol - Top 10 Season 12		
2013	American Idol: Top 9 Season 12		
2013	American Idol - Top 8 Season 12		
2013	American Idol - Top 7 Season 12		
2013	American Idol - Top 6 Season 12		
2013	American Idol - Top 5 Season 12		
2013	American Idol - Top 4 Season 12		
2013	American Idol - Top 4 (Redux) Season 12		
2013	American Idol - Top 3 Season 12		
2013	American Idol - Top 2 Season 12		
2013	America Idol: Idols Singing Idols		

== Other Releases ==
Year	Album title	Chart positions	Sales
2011	American Idol 10th Anniversary – The Hits: Volume 1	136 (Billboard 200)	7,000

== Individual solo albums ==
After Idol, several finalists and winners released their own solo albums and singles. For a list of major-label studio albums by Idol recording artists, see American Idol contestants discography.
