= List of number-one digital songs of 2012 (U.S.) =

2012 highest-selling digital singles in the United States

The highest-selling digital singles in the United States are ranked in the Hot Digital Songs chart, published by Billboard magazine. The data are compiled by Nielsen SoundScan based on each single's weekly digital sales, which combines sales of different versions of a single for a summarized figure.

== Chart history ==
Key
†	Indicates best-charting digital song of 2012

Issue date	Song	Artist(s)	Weekly sales	Ref(s)
January 7	"Sexy and I Know It"	LMFAO	395,000	
January 14	"Sexy and I Know It"	LMFAO	417,000	
January 21	"I Won't Give Up"	Jason Mraz	229,000	
January 28	"Set Fire to the Rain"	Adele	193,000	
February 4	"Turn Me On"	David Guetta featuring Nicki Minaj	198,000	
February 11	"Stronger (What Doesn't Kill You)"	Kelly Clarkson	225,000	
February 18	"Stronger (What Doesn't Kill You)"	Kelly Clarkson	237,000	
February 25	"We Are Young"	Fun featuring Janelle Monáe	296,000	
March 3	"Part of Me"	Katy Perry	411,000	
March 10	"We Are Young"	Fun featuring Janelle Monáe	291,000	
March 17	"We Are Young"	Fun featuring Janelle Monáe	302,000	
March 24	"We Are Young"	Fun featuring Janelle Monáe	322,000	
March 31	"We Are Young"	Fun featuring Janelle Monáe	349,000	
April 7	"We Are Young"	Fun featuring Janelle Monáe	387,000	
April 14	"Boyfriend"	Justin Bieber	521,000	
April 21	"We Are Young"	Fun featuring Janelle Monáe	390,000	
April 28	"Somebody That I Used to Know" †	Gotye featuring Kimbra	542,000	
May 5	"Payphone"	Maroon 5 featuring Wiz Khalifa	493,000	
May 12	"Somebody That I Used to Know"	Gotye featuring Kimbra	414,000	
May 19	"Somebody That I Used to Know"	Gotye featuring Kimbra	348,000	
May 26	"Somebody That I Used to Know"	Gotye featuring Kimbra	321,000	
June 2	"Call Me Maybe"	Carly Rae Jepsen	293,000	
June 9	"Call Me Maybe"	Carly Rae Jepsen	301,000	
June 16	"Call Me Maybe"	Carly Rae Jepsen	284,000	
June 23	"Call Me Maybe"	Carly Rae Jepsen	296,000	
June 30	"Call Me Maybe"	Carly Rae Jepsen	292,000	
July 7	"Call Me Maybe"	Carly Rae Jepsen	263,000	
July 14	"Call Me Maybe"	Carly Rae Jepsen	251,000	
July 21	"Call Me Maybe"	Carly Rae Jepsen	244,000	
July 28	"Wide Awake"	Katy Perry	205,000	
August 4	"Whistle"	Flo Rida	211,000	
August 11	"Whistle"	Flo Rida	237,000	
August 18	"Home"	Phillip Phillips	228,000	
August 25	"Whistle"	Flo Rida	217,000	
September 1	"We Are Never Ever Getting Back Together"	Taylor Swift	623,000	
September 8	"We Are Never Ever Getting Back Together"	Taylor Swift	307,000	
September 15	"We Are Never Ever Getting Back Together"	Taylor Swift	253,000	
September 22	"We Are Never Ever Getting Back Together"	Taylor Swift	284,000	
September 29	"We Are Never Ever Getting Back Together"	Taylor Swift	226,000	
October 6	"Gangnam Style"	Psy	301,000	
October 13	"Begin Again"	Taylor Swift	299,000	
October 20	"Live While We're Young"	One Direction	341,000	
October 27	"I Knew You Were Trouble"	Taylor Swift	416,000	
November 3	"Gangnam Style"	Psy	229,000	
November 10	"Gangnam Style"	Psy	255,000	
November 17	"Gangnam Style"	Psy	226,000	
November 24	"Gangnam Style"	Psy	187,000	
December 1	"Diamonds"	Rihanna	171,000	
December 8	"Gangnam Style"	Psy	229,000	
December 15	"Scream & Shout"	will.i.am featuring Britney Spears	196,000	
December 22	"Locked Out of Heaven"	Bruno Mars	197,000	
December 29	"Locked Out of Heaven"	Bruno Mars	222,000	

== See also ==
- 2012 in music
- List of Billboard Hot 100 number-one singles of 2012
