= List of Billboard Adult Contemporary number ones of 2013 =

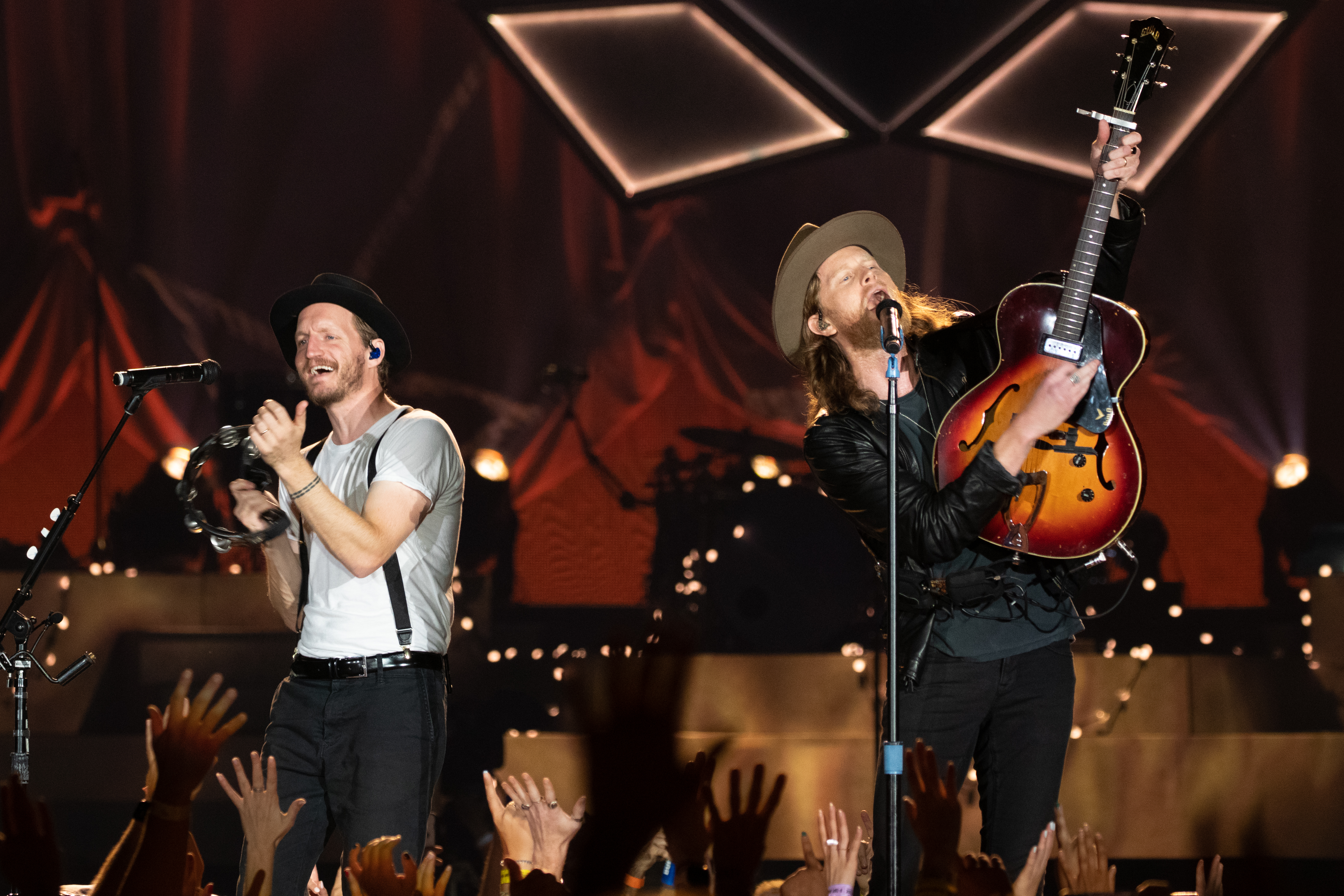
Folk-rock band the Lumineers topped the chart for eight weeks with "Ho Hey".

Adult Contemporary is a chart published by Billboard ranking the top-performing songs in the United States in the adult contemporary music (AC) market. In 2013, 11 different songs topped the chart in 52 issues of the magazine, based on weekly airplay data from radio stations compiled by Nielsen Broadcast Data Systems.

On the first chart of the year, the number one position was held by Rod Stewart with "Let It Snow! Let It Snow! Let It Snow!", the song's fifth consecutive week at number one. The following week, it was displaced from the top spot by "Somebody That I Used to Know" by Gotye featuring Kimbra, which returned to the top of the chart having had a lengthy run at number one the previous year. The song was replaced atop the chart in the issue of Billboard dated February 2 by "Home" by Phillip Phillips, the winner of the eleventh season of American Idol. The song, originally released the previous June, took more than 20 weeks to reach the top of the AC chart, but once it got to the top it held the number one position for 12 weeks, the longest unbroken run of the year. It went on to become the biggest-selling "coronation song" released by an American Idol winner to date. Phillips returned to the top of the chart later in the year with "Gone, Gone, Gone", making him one of only two artists to achieve more than one chart-topper during the year, the other being Pink.

In October, actress Anna Kendrick topped the chart with "Cups (Pitch Perfect's When I'm Gone)". The song became a surprise radio hit when the one-minute fragment which she performed in the film Pitch Perfect, accompanying herself only by clapping and tapping a plastic cup, was remixed and released as a full-length single. It topped the AC chart for three weeks before being displaced by Katy Perry's "Roar". Having begun with a Christmas song at number one, the year ended with another atop the chart, as Kelly Clarkson's "Underneath the Tree" held the top spot for the final three weeks of 2013.

== Chart history ==
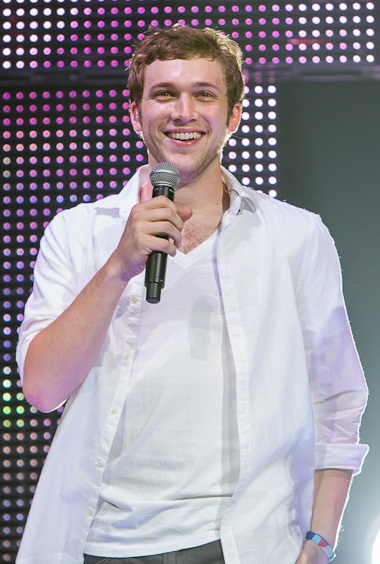
American Idol champion Phillip Phillips spent 12 weeks at number one with "Home", the longest unbroken run in the top spot during 2013.

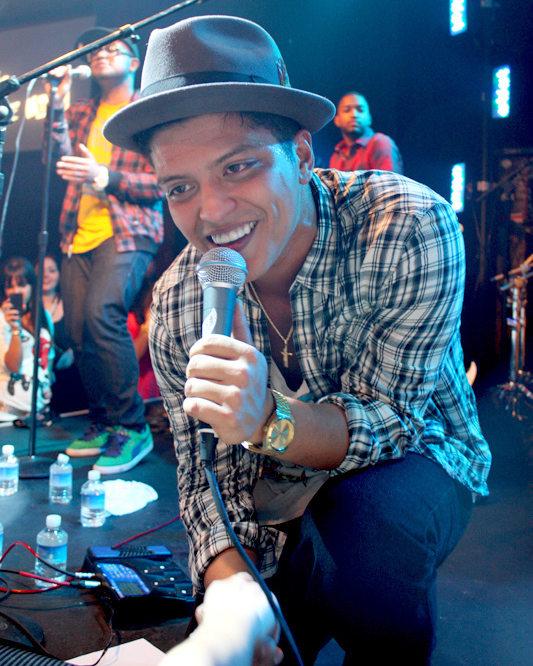
American singer Bruno Mars topped the chart for the first time since 2011 with his song "When I Was Your Man" which spent two non-consecutive weeks at number one.

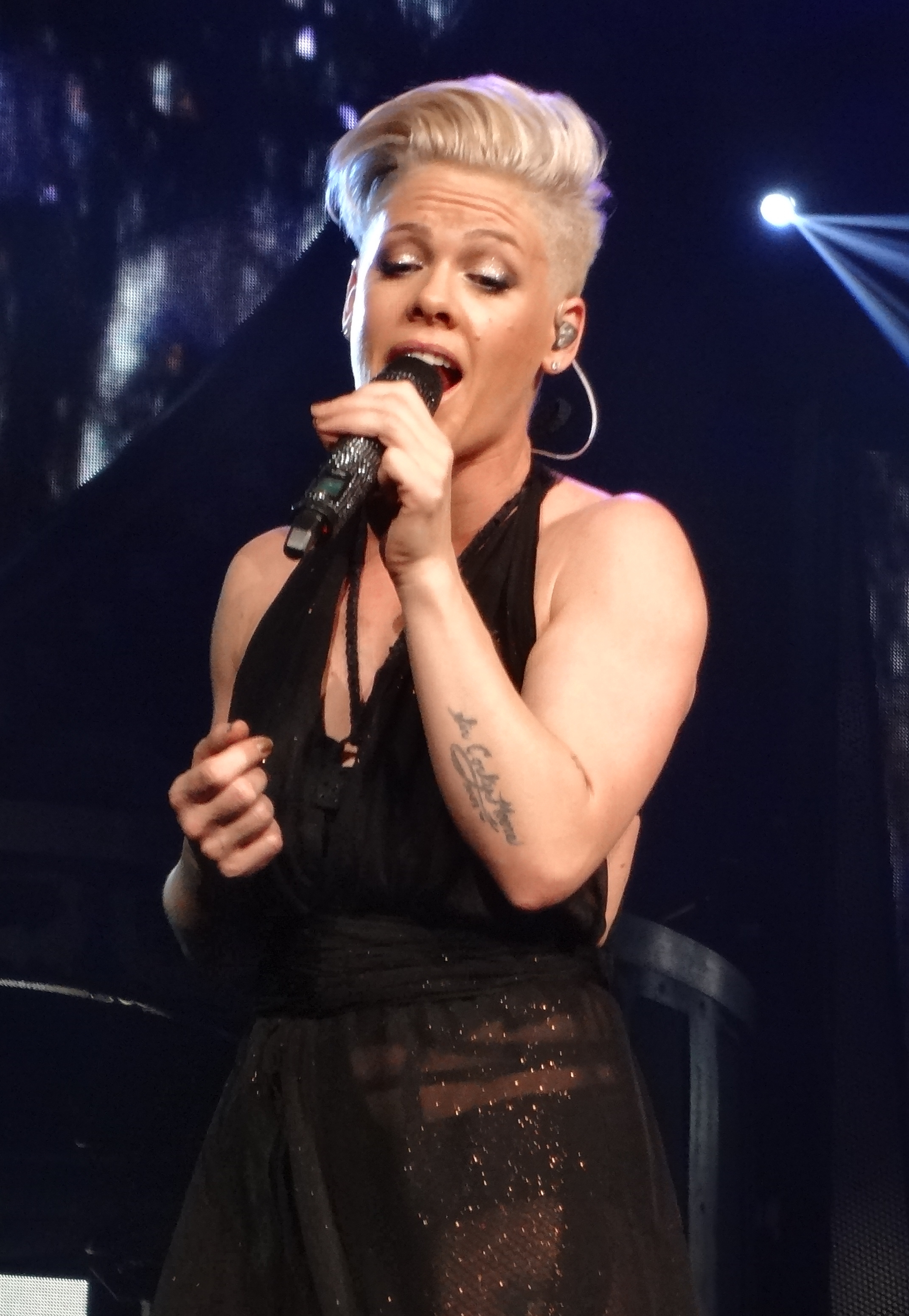
Pop/rock singer Pink had two number ones during the year.

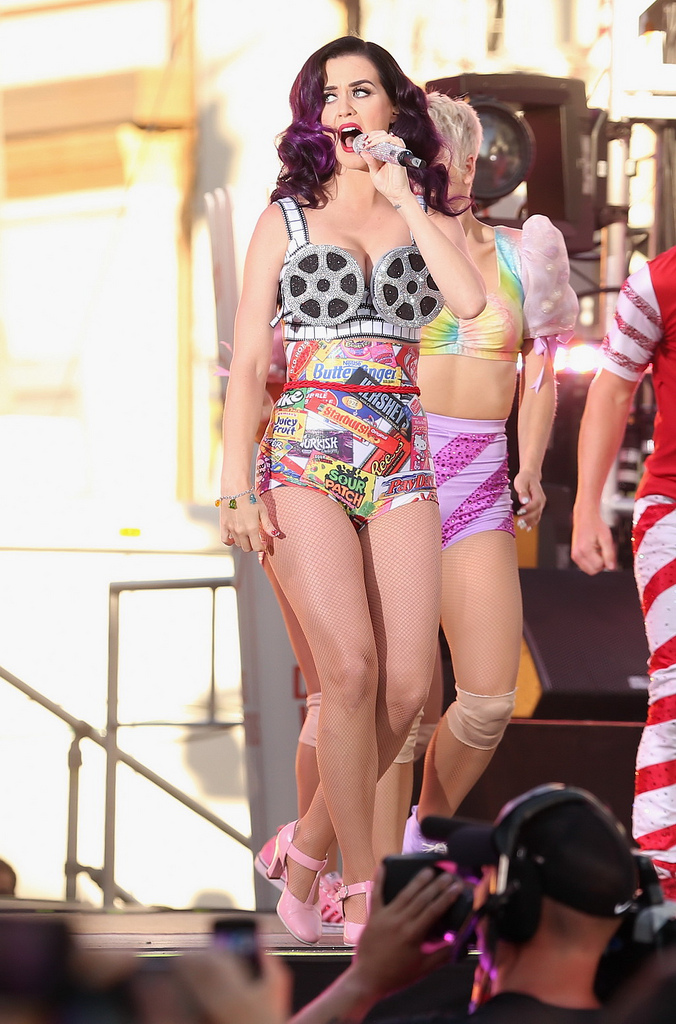
American pop singer Katy Perry spent five weeks at number one with her song "Roar".

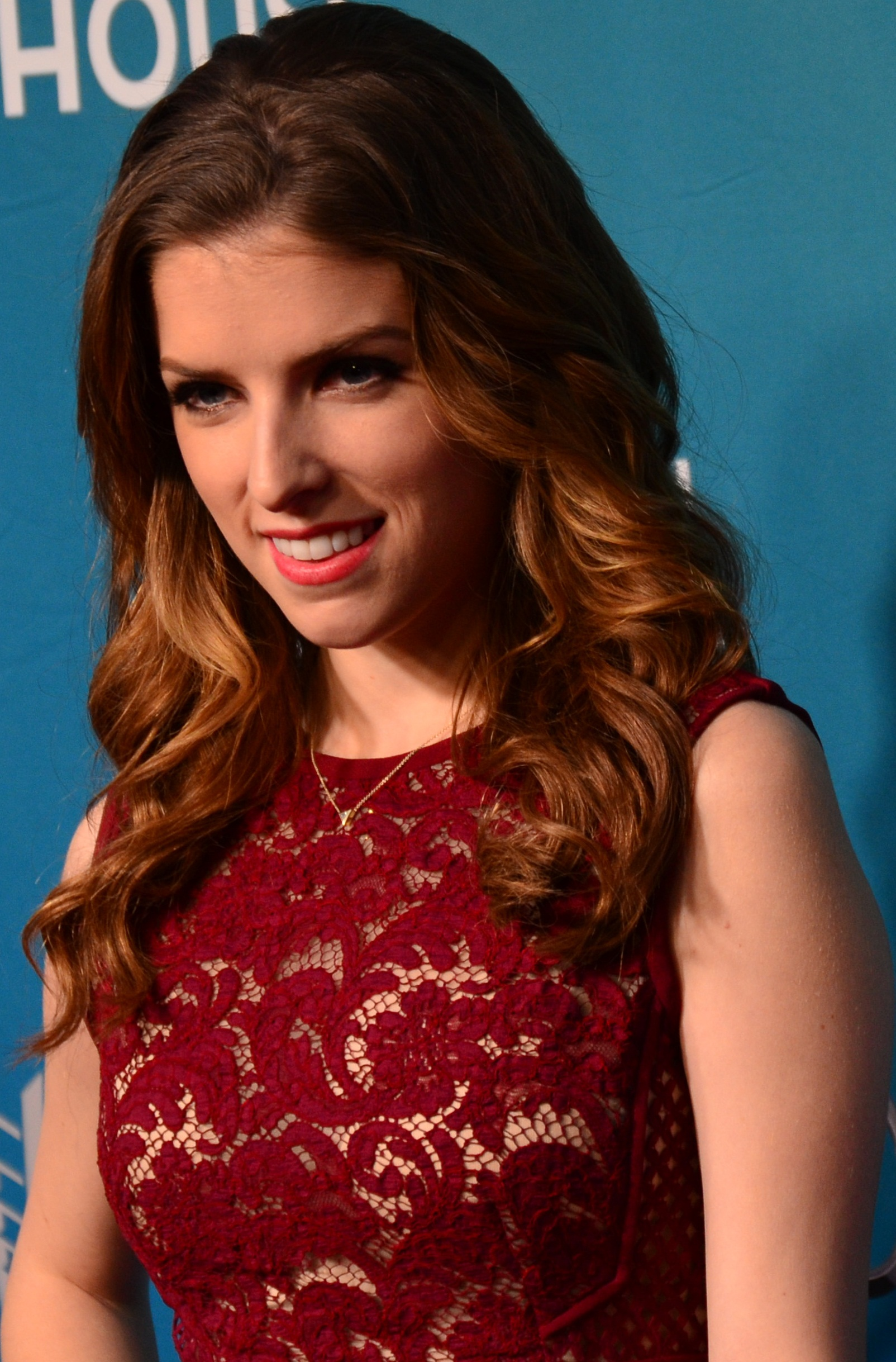
Actress Anna Kendrick topped the chart with a song from the film Pitch Perfect.

Key
†	Indicates best-performing AC song of 2013

Issue date	Title	Artist(s)	Ref.
January 5	"Let It Snow! Let It Snow! Let It Snow!"	Rod Stewart	
January 12	"Somebody That I Used to Know"	Gotye featuring Kimbra	
January 19	"Somebody That I Used to Know"	Gotye featuring Kimbra	
January 26	"Somebody That I Used to Know"	Gotye featuring Kimbra	
February 2	"Home"	Phillip Phillips	
February 9	"Home"	Phillip Phillips	
February 16	"Home"	Phillip Phillips	
February 23	"Home"	Phillip Phillips	
March 2	"Home"	Phillip Phillips	
March 9	"Home"	Phillip Phillips	
March 16	"Home"	Phillip Phillips	
March 23	"Home"	Phillip Phillips	
March 30	"Home"	Phillip Phillips	
April 6	"Home"	Phillip Phillips	
April 13	"Home"	Phillip Phillips	
April 20	"Home"	Phillip Phillips	
April 27	"Try"	Pink	
May 4	"Ho Hey" †	The Lumineers	
May 11	"Ho Hey" †	The Lumineers	
May 18	"Ho Hey" †	The Lumineers	
May 25	"Ho Hey" †	The Lumineers	
June 1	"Ho Hey" †	The Lumineers	
June 8	"Ho Hey" †	The Lumineers	
June 15	"Ho Hey" †	The Lumineers	
June 22	"Ho Hey" †	The Lumineers	
June 29	"When I Was Your Man"	Bruno Mars	
July 6	"Just Give Me a Reason"	Pink featuring Nate Ruess	
July 13	"When I Was Your Man"	Bruno Mars	
July 20	"Just Give Me a Reason"	Pink featuring Nate Ruess	
July 27	"Just Give Me a Reason"	Pink featuring Nate Ruess	
August 3	"Just Give Me a Reason"	Pink featuring Nate Ruess	
August 10	"Just Give Me a Reason"	Pink featuring Nate Ruess	
August 17	"Just Give Me a Reason"	Pink featuring Nate Ruess	
August 24	"Just Give Me a Reason"	Pink featuring Nate Ruess	
August 31	"Just Give Me a Reason"	Pink featuring Nate Ruess	
September 7	"Gone, Gone, Gone"	Phillip Phillips	
September 14	"Gone, Gone, Gone"	Phillip Phillips	
September 21	"Gone, Gone, Gone"	Phillip Phillips	
September 28	"Gone, Gone, Gone"	Phillip Phillips	
October 5	"Gone, Gone, Gone"	Phillip Phillips	
October 12	"Just Give Me a Reason"	Pink featuring Nate Ruess	
October 19	"Cups (Pitch Perfect's When I'm Gone)"	Anna Kendrick	
October 26	"Cups (Pitch Perfect's When I'm Gone)"	Anna Kendrick	
November 2	"Cups (Pitch Perfect's When I'm Gone)"	Anna Kendrick	
November 9	"Roar"	Katy Perry	
November 16	"Roar"	Katy Perry	
November 23	"Roar"	Katy Perry	
November 30	"Roar"	Katy Perry	
December 7	"Roar"	Katy Perry	
December 14	"Underneath the Tree"	Kelly Clarkson	
December 21	"Underneath the Tree"	Kelly Clarkson	
December 28	"Underneath the Tree"	Kelly Clarkson	

== See also ==
- 2013 in music
- List of artists who reached number one on the U.S. Adult Contemporary chart
