= Greg Holden =

- Born: Aberdeen, Scotland, UK
- Genres: folk, soft rock, acoustic rock
- Occupations: Singer, songwriter
- Instruments: Vocals, guitar, piano, drum
- Years active: 2005–present
- Labels: Falling Art Recordings; Collective Sounds; Warner Music Group
- Website: www.gregholdenonline.com

Greg Holden (born 28 February 1983) is a Scottish singer-songwriter based in the United States. He is best known for his hit charity single "The Lost Boy" and for co-writing "Home", the 2012 debut single for American Idol-winner Phillip Phillips.

== Early life ==
Holden was born in Aberdeen, Scotland, and lived in Methlick in Aberdeenshire until he was three. The family then moved to Lancashire in England, and he was raised in Morecambe and then Leyland. He went to St. Patrick's Primary School, Heysham near Morecambe, then attended Leyland St. Mary's Catholic Technology College and the University of Central Lancashire. Holden started learning to play the guitar when he was 18.

After graduating in 2005, he went to Brighton with his band. He then moved to London in 2007 to attempt a career, before moving to New York City in 2009. He relocated to Los Angeles in July 2016.

== Music career ==
Holden wrote his first song called "You Go Left, I'll Go Right" when he was 18. He won the Lancashire Evening Post Battle of the Bands in 2005.

Greg first gained a large following by posting live videos of himself performing his songs on YouTube. One series of videos was called the "Not My Living Room Tour" where he performed for his fans in their living rooms. Greg Holden's debut album, A Word in Edgeways (2009, 9 tracks) was followed by the EP Sing for the City. All of Holden's albums were initially either self-released or released on his own label, Falling Art Recordings.

In 2009, Holden moved to New York soon after the release of his first album. A few months later, he toured as a support act for Ingrid Michaelson in the US after she heard him live in his previous visit to New York.

His songs have been featured on several TV shows, for example a track from A Word in Edgeways, "Choking on the Concrete", was featured on an episode of the TV show Private Practice. Other shows include ABC's Make It Or Break It, One Tree Hill and the CW's Life Unexpected.

=== 2011–2014: I Don't Believe You ===
Greg Holden's second album, I Don't Believe You, was funded by fan donations using Kickstarter in 2010 which raised $30,000. In late 2010 Holden started recording his second studio album with producer Tony Berg in Los Angeles. The album was released in May 2011, and an acoustic version of I Don't Believe You was also released in March 2012, including 2 bonus tracks, one of which is "The Lost Boy".

"The Lost Boy" was written by Holden in 2011 but was not included in the original release of the album, but added in its subsequent releases. It was inspired by the book What is the What by American writer Dave Eggers about Sudanese refugees. Holden recorded it and released as a charity single on 20 December 2011, and it became a hit for him in the Netherlands, topping the Dutch iTunes singles chart on Christmas Day and reaching No. 2 on the Dutch Top 40. In December 2013, he released an official video for "The Lost Boy" after his album I Don't Believe You was re-released in the US when he became signed by Collective Sounds.

The song "The Lost Boy" was featured in an episode of the TV show Sons of Anarchy in 2012, where it was used as the musical backdrop to the funeral procession of Opie Winston. In the following week debuted at No. 36 on the Billboard Rock Charts, selling over 20,000 copies. Holden's single "I Need An Energy", which was released on 26 October 2012, is used on the soundtrack of the film, Chasing Mavericks.

Holden has toured throughout Europe and the United States as a headliner. The Dutch leg of his 2012 European tour sold out months in advance. He has also toured with A Great Big World, BOY, The Lone Bellow, and Jukebox the Ghost.

==== "Home" ====
In 2012, Holden became known in the United States for "Home", a song he co-wrote with Drew Pearson. The song was picked by American Idol mentor Jimmy Iovine for Phillip Phillips as his coronation song for the final of the show's season 11. The song quickly topped the US iTunes singles chart and became the best-selling song by an American Idol alum with over 5 million copies sold. In 2014, "Home" was named one of the most performed pop songs of 2013 by ASCAP, and Holden also performed "Home" at the 2014 ASCAP Award Ceremony.

=== 2015: Chase the Sun ===
In 2014, Holden worked with Greg Wells to record a new album. He signed a record deal with Warner Brothers, and the new album, Chase the Sun, was released on 14 April 2015. It was preceded by the single "Hold On Tight", which debuted in the Triple A chart April 2015. The single was released on 27 January 2015, and its video on 18 February 2015. The album also includes "Boys in the Street", which was written after he was asked by Everyone Is Gay, an organization that supports LGBTQ youth, to contribute to their 2014 fundraiser compilation, The Gayest Compilation Ever Made II.

Holden co-wrote three songs on A Great Big World's sophomore album When The Morning Comes (which was released on 13 November 2015): All I Want Is Love, The Future's Right In Front Of Me and When The Morning Comes.

=== 2019: World War Me ===
Holden was dropped by Warner Bros Records in late 2017 just before he was due to record his fourth album. He decided to record the album himself in his home studio in Los Angeles, and the album World War Me was released in 2019. He wrote five of the songs on the album with Garrison Starr, and recorded all the songs himself except for “On the Run” which was recorded by Butch Walker, with whom he had originally intended to record the album.

== Discography ==
=== Albums ===
| Title | Album details | Peak chart positions | Notes |
| Title | Album details | NL Top 40 | Notes |
|---|---|---|---|
| A Word in Edgeways | Released: 19 February 2009; Label: Falling Art Recordings; Formats: digital download | - | |
| I Don't Believe You | Released: 31 May 2011, 30 September 2013; Label: Falling Art Recordings, Collective Sounds; Formats: CD (2013), digital download (2011, 2013) | | Re-released in 2013 |
| I Don't Believe You (Acoustic Version) | Released: 13 March 2012; Label: Falling Art Recordings; Formats: CD, digital download | 22 | |
| Chase the Sun | Released: 14 Apr 2015; Label: Warner Bros; Formats: CD, digital download | | |
| World War Me | Released 29 March 2019; Label: Falling Art Music; Formats: CD, Vinyl, Digital | | |

=== EPs ===
- 2007: Run, Don't Walk
- 2009: Sing for the City

=== Singles ===
| Year | Title | Peak chart positions | | | | Album |
| Year | Title | US Rock | US AAA | NL Top 40 | NL Single Top 100 | Album |
|---|---|---|---|---|---|---|
| 2011 | "The Lost Boy" | 36 | — | 15 | 2 | Non-album song |
| 2015 | "Hold On Tight" | — | 15 | — | — | Chase the Sun |
| 2016 | "Exactly Like You" | — | — | — | — | 30 Days, 50 Songs |

Others

- 2012: "I Need an Energy" (on soundtrack of film Chasing Mavericks)
- 2015: "Boys in the Street" (in collective album The Gayest Compilation Ever Made II. Also included in Holden album Chase the Sun)

=== Songwriting ===
- 2011: "Home" (Phillip Phillips song, appearing in Phillips' album The World from the Side of the Moon)
- 2015: "When the Morning Comes" (title track) / "All I Want Is Love" / "The Future's Right in Front of Me" (3 tracks on A Great Big World's second album When the Morning Comes released 13 November 2015)
