= Collateral =

Collateral may refer to:

== Business and finance ==
- Collateral (finance), a pledge of property by a borrower to secure repayment of a loan
- Marketing collateral, promotional media used in marketing and sales

== Film ==
- Collateral (film), a 2004 thriller starring Tom Cruise and Jamie Foxx
- Colateral (documentary), 2020, directed by Venezuelan journalist Lucrecia Cisneros

== Music ==
- Collateral (album), 2015, by NERVO
- Collateral (Phillip Phillips album), 2018
- "Collateral", a Twelve Foot Ninja song from their 2016 album Outlier

== Television ==
- Collateral (TV series), a 2018 BBC crime drama
- "Collateral" (Holby City), a 2014 TV episode
- "Collateral" (Justified), a 2015 TV episode
- "Collateral" (Matlock), a 2026 TV episode
- "Collateral" (NCIS: Los Angeles), a 2012 TV episode
- "Collateral" (Smallville), a 2011 TV episode

== Other uses ==
- Collateral (kinship), kin that are not in a direct line of descent

== See also ==
- Collateralization the development of alternative blood vessels to serve an inadequately supplied organ or vascular bed
