= Roar (song) =

2013 single by Katy Perry

Single by Katy Perry

from the album Prism
- Written: March 2013
- Released: August 10, 2013
- Recorded: March 2013
- Studio: Luke's in the Boo (Malibu, California); Playback Recording Studio (Santa Barbara, California); MXM Studios (Stockholm, Sweden); Secret Garden Studios (Montecito, California)
- Genre: Power pop
- Length: 3:43
- Label: Capitol
- Songwriters: Katy Perry; Lukasz Gottwald; Max Martin; Bonnie McKee; Henry Walter
- Producers: Dr. Luke; Max Martin; Cirkut

Katy Perry singles chronology
"Wide Awake" (2012)	"Roar" (2013)	"Who You Love" (2013)

Music video
- "Roar" on YouTube

"Roar" is a song by American singer-songwriter Katy Perry. It was released on August 10, 2013, by Capitol Records as the lead single from her fourth studio album, Prism (2013). Perry co-wrote the song in March 2013 with Bonnie McKee and its producers Dr. Luke, Max Martin, and Cirkut. "Roar" was recorded that month at Luke's in the Boo in Malibu, California, Playback Recording Studio in Santa Barbara, California, Secret Garden Studios in Montecito, California, and MXM Studios in Stockholm, Sweden. The track is a power pop song containing elements of arena rock and lyrics centering on standing up for oneself and self-empowerment.

The song was a commercial success, topping charts in Australia, Austria, Canada, Ireland, Israel, Lebanon, New Zealand, Scotland, Slovenia, South Korea, the United Kingdom, and the United States. "Roar" was the fifth-best-selling single worldwide in 2013 according to the International Federation of the Phonographic Industry (IFPI), and has since gone on to sell 15 million copies. "Roar" has sold 6.6 million copies in the US, over 1 million in the United Kingdom, and was Australia's best-selling song of the year with 560,000 copies sold within that time. It was also the seventh best-selling single of the entire 2010s decade in Australia. It is certified five times diamond in Brazil, two times diamond in Australia, fifteen times platinum in the US, and Diamond in Canada and France. When "Roar" was certified Diamond by the Recording Industry Association of America (RIAA), Perry became the first artist to have three Diamond-certified singles in the country, the others being "Firework" and "Dark Horse".

To promote the song, Perry performed under the Brooklyn Bridge at the 2013 MTV Video Music Awards, on The X Factor Australia in October 2013, at the Sydney Opera House also in October 2013, and on the German TV show Schlag den Raab in November 2013. Grady Hall and Mark Kudsi directed the song's music video, which features Perry trying to adapt to the jungle and taming a tiger after surviving a plane crash. It has reached over 4 billion views on Vevo. The song was nominated for Song of the Year and Best Pop Solo Performance at the 56th Annual Grammy Awards, and won two People's Choice Awards for Favorite Song and Favorite Music Video. In 2015, Perry would perform the song at the Super Bowl XLIX halftime show in Glendale, Arizona.

== Production and composition ==
"Roar"
A 23-second sample of "Roar", a pop song with influences of rock subgenres that lyrically, revolves around a theme of empowerment.

The song was mixed by Serban Ghenea at MixStar Studios. "Roar" was recorded in four other studios: Luke's in the Boo, Playback Recording Studio and Secret Garden Studios, all located in the state of California, as well as MXM Studios in Stockholm, Sweden. Perry co-wrote the song with Bonnie McKee and its producers Dr. Luke, Max Martin, and Cirkut. All its development took place in March 2013. McKee told MTV that "Roar" is "kind of a 'pick yourself up and dust yourself off and keep going', female-empowerment song" and "kind of an epiphany song." Perry said she wrote the song after undergoing therapy, saying she was "sick of keeping all these feelings inside and not speaking up for myself".

Musically, "Roar" is a power pop song that features elements of arena rock. Throughout the song, Perry "flexes diva-like vocals", singing the lyric "Hey!" several times in a way resemblant of The Lumineers. The song's instrumentation is composed of "pounding" pianos and "booming" bass drums. Musicnotes published this song in the key of B♭ major in a 4/4 time signature with a moderate tempo of 90 beats per minute. Perry's vocal range spans from the low note B♭_{3} to the high note E♭_{5}, while the music follows the chord progression of B♭–Cm–Gm–E♭. The song shares the theme of empowerment with Perry's single "Firework". Perry described the track as a song speaking about standing up for oneself.

== Release ==
Perry announced "Roar" would be the first single from Prism with the release of a video teaser featuring the singer burning a blue wig. More video teasers were released onto YouTube, showing Perry at a funeral with a coffin decorated with the singer's famous pink and white pinwheels dress. It features a tiger print border around Perry, who wears a blue Japanese silk sukajan jacket with the image of a tiger printed on its back.. A lyric video produced by Joe Humpay, Aya Tanimura, Tim Zimmer, and Tuan Le was uploaded to YoutTube. The video depicts Perry performing everyday activities, including eating breakfast, using the bathroom, and taking a bath, while texting the song's lyrics to friends. Some words are replaced with emoji characters. Music producer Dillion Francis accused the video of plagiarizing the instant-messaging concept used in his music video for "Messages".

The first video teaser for "Roar" was released on August 2, 2013, along with an announcement that the American release was scheduled for August 12 with a subsequent release to mainstream radio on August 13. However, the song debuted two days earlier than expected by leaking on August 10. The UK release was originally scheduled for September 8, but on August 30 Perry announced the release date would be moved up to September 1.

== Critical reception ==
Miriam Coleman from Rolling Stone appreciated the song's "easy poppy beat" and its "repeated refrains", factors she believed contributed to make the song a "determined note for the new album". James Montgomery of MTV News described it as "one of the more perfect pop songs to come down the pipeline in quite a while". Gerrick D. Kennedy from Los Angeles Times also gave a positive review, classifying "Roar" as a "sweet, poppy confection with a bit of bite". Melinda Newman from HitFix saw the song as a "great change of pace" for Perry, whilst Andrew Hampp from Billboard believed it to be a return to the style of her album One of the Boys, but criticized its tempo and its lyrics that "rarely rise above easy clichés and rhymes". Sal Cinquemani from Slant Magazine described the song as "more of a yelp than a roar".

== Accolades ==
=== Awards and nominations ===
Name of award, year listed, category, and result
Award	Year	Category	Result	Ref.
Capricho Awards de Gato Nacional	2013	International Hit	Won	
Digital Spy Reader Awards	2013	Best Song	Nominated	
The Official Number One Awards (Note: The Number One Award for singles was first introduced by the Official Charts Company (OCC) in December 2011, followed by the introduction of the Number One Award for albums in 2015.)	2013	Number One Single	Won	
The Official Specialist Number One Awards (Note: The Specialist Number One Awards were launched in January 2021. These awards recognize all number one albums and singles that have reached the top of any OCC chart, excluding the Official Singles and Official Albums charts, for any prior years.)	2013	Number One Singles Downloads	Won	
The Official Vodafone Big Top 40 Number One Awards (Note: The Official Vodafone Big Top 40 Number One Awards were introduced in 2009 and are given to artists who top the Big Top 40 chart. They are awarded for each week they spend at number one.)	2013	Number One Award	Won	
The Official Vodafone Big Top 40 Number One Awards	2013	Number One Award	Won	
The Official Vodafone Big Top 40 Number One Awards	2013	Number One Award	Won	
Queerty Awards	2013	Anthem of the Year	Nominated	
Vevo Certified Awards	2013	Vevo Certified Award	Won	
ARIA Number One Chart Awards	2014	Number One Single	Won	
ARIA Number One Chart Awards	2014	Year-End Number One Single	Won	
ASCAP Pop Music Awards	2014	Most Performed Song	Won	
Billboard Music Awards	2014	Top Hot 100 Song	Nominated	
Billboard Music Awards	2014	Top Digital Song	Nominated	
Billboard Music Awards	2014	Top Radio Song	Nominated	
Billboard Music Awards	2014	Top Streaming Song (Video)	Nominated	
Grammy Awards	2014	Song of the Year	Nominated	
Grammy Awards	2014	Best Pop Solo Performance	Nominated	
MTV Video Music Awards Japan	2014	Best Video of the Year	Nominated	
MTV Video Music Awards Japan	2014	Best Female Video	Nominated	
Myx Music Awards	2014	Favorite International Video	Won	
Nickelodeon Kids Choice Awards	2014	Favourite Song	Nominated	
NRJ Music Awards	2014	International Song of the Year	Won	
People's Choice Awards	2014	Favorite Song	Won	
People's Choice Awards	2014	Favorite Music Video	Won	
Premios Juventud	2014	Favourite Song, Not in Spanish	Nominated	
Radio Disney Music Awards	2014	Song of the Year	Nominated	
RTHK International Pop Poll Awards	2014	Top Ten International Gold Songs	Won	
RTHK International Pop Poll Awards	2014	Super Gold Song	Won	
Webby Awards	2014	Online Film and Music Video (Note: The lyric video for "Roar" received an honorary award.)	Honoree	
CMT Music Awards	2015	Performance of the Year (Note: The CMT Crossroads live performance of "Roar" with Kacey Musgraves was nominated.)	Nominated	
RIAA Diamond Awards	2017	Diamond Song Award	Won	
Now That's What I Call Music! Awards	2018	Song of the Teens	Nominated	
Spotify Awards	2023	Billion-Play Award (Note: Spotify awards plaques to artists when their songs reach a billion streams on the platform.)	Won	
MTV Video Music Awards	2024	VMAs Most Iconic Performance (Note: The live performance of "Roar" at the 2013 MTV Video Music Awards won the award.)	Won	
QQ Music
QQ Music	2025	20th Anniversary Top Western Songs	Won	

=== Listicles ===
Name of publication, year listed, name of listicle, and result
Publication	Year	Listicle	Result	Ref.
Entertainment Weekly	2013	Best Songs of the Year	5th	
Google	2013	Most Googled Songs in Australia	5th	
Google	2013	Most Googled Song Lyrics in Australia	6th	
Rolling Stone	2013	Best Songs of the Year	18th	
Billboard	2017	Best Empowerment Songs	Placed	
HuffPost	2017	Best Women's empowerment Songs	Placed	
Oprah Daily	2022	Best Women's empowerment Songs	12th	
Glamour UK	2023	Best Women's empowerment Songs	8th	
Paste	2023	Best Number One Songs of 2013	5th	
Rolling Stone	2025	Best Max Martin Songs	37th	
Time Out	2025	Best Inspirational Songs	14th	

== Plagiarism allegations ==
Upon the release of "Roar", many accused Perry of copying Sara Bareilles's "Brave". When asked about the controversy between the two songs, Bareilles answered: "Katy's a friend of mine and we've known each other a really long time", and was upset that there was a "negative spin on two artists that are choosing to share positive messages." She also mentioned knowing about "Roar" before its release and stated "If I'm not mad I don't know why anybody else is upset". Dr. Luke replied to the accusations on August 14, 2013: "Roar was written and recorded BEFORE Brave came out." In response to the attention "Brave" received as a result of the plagiarism accusations, Bareilles's record label, Epic Records, decided to promote "Brave" to the mainstream pop radio format.

== Commercial performance ==
=== Worldwide ===
According to the International Federation of the Phonographic Industry (IFPI), "Roar" sold 9.9 million units (combined sales and track-equivalent streams) globally throughout 2013 and was the fifth-best-selling single of the year. As of November 2019, the song has sold 15 million copies worldwide.

=== The Americas ===
On the Billboard Hot 100, the song debuted at number 85 on the week ending August 24, 2013, due to radio airplay. The following week, during its first week on sale, "Roar" sold 557,000 digital copies, earning Perry the highest first-week sales numbers of 2013 and also her biggest digital song sales week ever, breaking her previous record held by "Firework", which sold 509,000 digital copies for the week ending January 8, 2011. The song soared eighty-three positions to number two in its second week, becoming Perry's twelfth top-ten entry in the United States, and her ninth consecutive single to reach the top three on the Hot 100. After another week at number two, "Roar" reached number one for the chart dated September 14, 2013, becoming Perry's eighth number one on the Hot 100 and her ninth digital number-one single, after selling 448,000 copies. "Roar" spent a total two weeks at number one before it was surpassed by Miley Cyrus's "Wrecking Ball". On its seventh frame, the song moved 2–1 (peak audience impressions of 159 million) and became Perry's sixth number one on the Billboard Hot 100 Airplay, as well as becoming her fastest climb to the top position.

"Roar" also reached number one on both the US Mainstream Top 40 and Adult Pop Songs. The number-one position on the Pop Songs chart gave Perry her tenth number one, tying her with Rihanna for the most number ones on the airplay-based chart. The number-one position on the Adult Pop Songs chart also gave Perry multiple milestones; it became her eighth chart-topper, tying her with Maroon 5 and Pink as the act with the most number-ones there. It also made the fastest ascension to the top spot; a record previously held by Perry's own single "California Gurls" (2010). It also set airplay records in both of the charts, by becoming the most weekly-played song in history, with 16,065 and 5,309 plays per week, respectively.

The song has also reached the top spot on both the Adult contemporary chart and Hot Dance Club Songs. In addition to this, the track also reached number one on both the On Demand and Streaming charts, with a weekly peak of 2.1 million and 12 million, respectively. "Roar" surpassed digital sales of four million in its seventeenth week, faster than any other song in digital history. Its sales reached 4.41 million by the end of 2013, becoming the sixth best-seller of the year. As of August 2020, the song has sold 6,600,000 copies in the US. In June 2017, the song was certified Diamond by the Recording Industry Association of America (RIAA), thus making Perry the first artist to achieve three Diamond certified singles, following "Dark Horse" and "Firework". As of July 2024, "Roar" has since been certified 15× Platinum by the RIAA, for sales and equivalent-units of 15 million in the country.

On August 31, 2013, "Roar" debuted at number one on the Canadian Hot 100 on the strength of digital downloads. In doing so, it became only the eleventh song to debut at number one on the chart, and it also became Perry's third number-one debut, making her the artist with most number-one debuts at the time. It also became Perry's ninth Canadian Hot 100 number one, breaking the tie she shared with Rihanna for the most chart toppers. It has so far spent five non-consecutive weeks atop the chart. "Roar" was also in the top of the Canadian Digital Chart for three non-consecutive weeks; there, it was Perry's sixth number-one single.

In Mexico, "Roar" reached number one on the Monitor Latino English-language airplay chart. The song peaked at number two in the Venezuelan Pop Rock Chart.

=== Europe ===
In the United Kingdom, "Roar" entered at number one on the UK Singles Chart on September 8, 2013, selling 179,500 copies in its first week and ending the prolonged number-one run of Ellie Goulding's "Burn". The song became Perry's fourth UK number-one single. The single spent two weeks atop the chart before being succeeded by "Talk Dirty" by Jason Derulo ft. 2 Chainz. The song also debuted atop the adjacent UK chart of Scotland and the Irish Singles Chart. "Roar" was the 6th best-selling song of 2013 in the United Kingdom where it became her second single after "Firework" to sell over a million copies in January 2015, thus making Katy Perry one of only 18 artists ever to achieve more than one million sales in the nation. It has sold 1,112,787 copies in the United Kingdom as of September 2017, and has been certified quadruple platinum by the British Phonographic Industry (BPI). According to Phonographic Performance Limited (PPL), "Roar" was the seventh most played song across the nation in 2014.

"Roar" reached number four on the Italian Singles Chart, where it was eventually certified platinum by the Federation of the Italian Music Industry, for sales of over 15,000 digital copies. In Spain, the single peaked at number five on the sales chart, according to PROMUSICAE. In Austria, it became a number-one on the Ö3 Austria Top 40, while in Germany and Switzerland, it reached numbers two and three, respectively. In the Belgian Ultratop 50, "Roar" peaked at number five in Flanders and number seven in Wallonia. In France the song peaked at number five and stayed 53 weeks, becoming Perry's fourth top-five hit after "I Kissed A Girl", "If We Ever Meet Again", and "California Gurls". In Norway, it stayed 24 weeks and peaked at number four, becoming Perry's fifth top five in the country. "Roar" found placings among the top-ten of the airplay charts in Czech Republic, Hungary, and Slovakia. Within the Billboard digital charts of Greece, Luxembourg and Portugal, "Roar" peaked at number two in both the Greece and Luxembourg charts and at number eight in the Portuguese chart.

In Russia, on the TopHit Weekly General airplay chart, "Roar" debuted at number 395 on August 25, 2013, and it has climbed the chart, peaking at number five on November 17, 2013. On the TopHit Weekly Audience Choice chart, it peaked at number three on the issue dated October 27, 2013.

=== Africa and Asia-Pacific ===
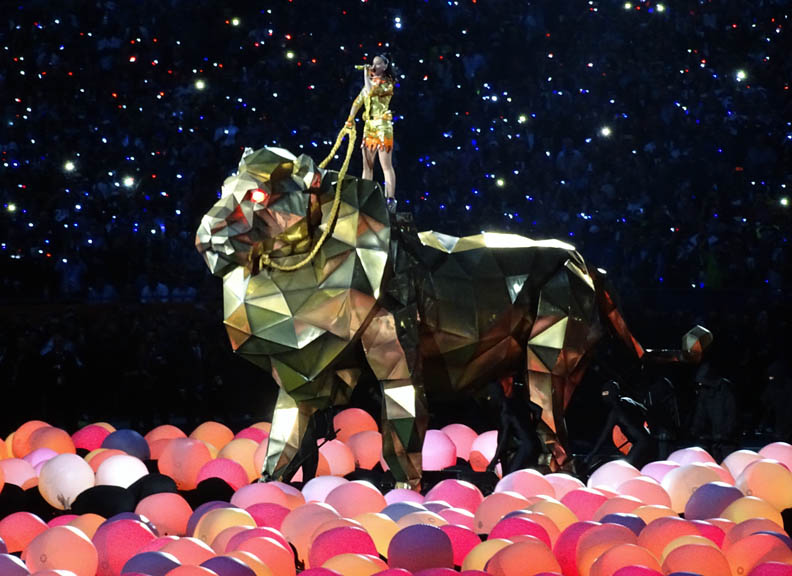
Perry performing "Roar" during the Super Bowl XLIX halftime show

"Roar" entered at the top of the New Zealand Singles Chart after just four days on sale, becoming Perry's ninth number-one single, second top debut and her eleventh top ten. After less than five weeks, the Recording Industry Association of New Zealand certified the single quadruple platinum, denoting sales exceeding 60,000 units. The song is listed as the 48th best-selling single of all time in New Zealand, making Perry the only singer to have the most entries, which including "California Gurls", "Firework" and "E.T.". In Australia, the song became Perry's third song to top the ARIA Singles Chart after "I Kissed a Girl" and "California Gurls". It was the country's highest performing song of the year, topping the charts for 9 weeks and selling 560,000 copies by the end of 2013. "Roar" has since been certified 20× platinum by the Australian Recording Industry Association (ARIA). On the Gaon Chart of South Korea, it reached number one on the international chart. In Japan, the song entered the Japan Hot 100 at number seven. They reached number one in both the Media Forest airplay chart in Israel, and the Lebanese Singles Chart. Similarly, in South Africa, the song peaked at number two on the EMA airplay chart.

== Music video ==
=== Production and release ===
Filming of the music video for "Roar", began on August 7, 2013 and ended on August 9, 2013. A lyric video was released on August 12, 2013. The video was released on September 5, 2013, directed by Grady Hall and Mark Kudsi, and filmed at the Los Angeles County Arboretum and Botanic Garden. A 21-second teaser of the video had previously been uploaded on August 25, 2013. Nokia posted a two-minute behind the scenes video on September 4, 2013. On November 14, 2013, an extended 17-minute behind-the-scenes video was uploaded to Vevo.

The music video for "Roar" was the fourth most viewed music video in 2013 worldwide. On July 7, 2015, the music video became the fourth video to reach one billion views on Vevo, making Perry the first artist in history to have two music videos with over a billion views. Four years later, it was ranked fifth globally among the most-watched videos of the 2010s decade, and it also ranked fourth in the United Kingdom. During May 2024, it reached four billion views, becoming the most viewed music video by a female artist on YouTube at that time.

=== Synopsis ===
At the beginning of the video, Perry and her negligent boyfriend (played by actor and model Brian Nagel) have crashed their plane in the middle of the jungle. Perry shows signs of worry, while her boyfriend takes selfies and dumps his bags on her to explore. As it turns to night, they wander through the jungle as he throws things back at her. Suddenly, he is attacked by a tiger as the music abruptly pauses and Perry dumps her bags and runs off screaming. She approaches a lake and is almost bitten by a crocodile when she tries to take a drink. She sits on a rock and ends up with a tarantula crawling on her. As she looks into the lake while singing the chorus, she sees a reflection of a tiger instead of herself. Behind her, in the darkness, there are dozens of pairs of blinking eyes, but they are revealed to be fireflies which fly around her before forming an image of a roaring tiger in the sky.

Perry in the music video for "Roar" dressed as "Queen of the Jungle"

Presumably, a few days later, Perry has since made friends with a monkey and uses her stiletto heel to form a spear where she is now barefoot and only wearing what is left of her outfit. She uses the spear to shoot a banana, which she gives to the monkey. In another scene, she bathes in the lake, with the help of an elephant who sprays her with water from the lake using its trunk. Perry helps a crocodile by brushing its teeth using a toothbrush she has salvaged and tries to reach her clothes which have been taken by the elephant. At night, she holds a torch and explores a cave. Inside, she watches an animated drawing on the wall in which humans try to kill a tiger with fire; attempting to burn it as it grows stronger and shooting spears which it sends firing back towards them with its roar. The next morning, Perry emerges from the cave wearing a leopard-print bikini top, a grass skirt, and unspecified lacings on her legs. She displays a boost of confidence and holds the spear she made earlier. She stands on top of a waterfall, overlooking the jungle, and then swings across the sky on a vine.

With the help of the monkey, Perry builds a cat toy that she uses to distract the tiger who killed her boyfriend earlier in the video. The two of them roar at each other until her roar tames the tiger as it sits in front of her submissively. Afterwards, she is shown sitting on a giant grass throne, wearing a flower crown as the rest of the jungle animals sit around her, including the tiger, monkey and elephant. The tiger is shown wearing a collar that says "Kitty Purry", a reference to her real-life cat of the same name. Perry takes selfies with the monkey on her boyfriend's phone, applies lipstick made from berry juice, and gives the elephant a pedicure with paint made from berries.

She then awakens from sleeping in the plane, leading the viewer to think all the previous events have just been a dream, but walks out of the plane wreckage still in the jungle, stretching her arms and yawning with the animals sitting around her.

=== Reception ===
James Montgomery from MTV News believed that the video drew inspiration from Sheena, Queen of the Jungle and stated the video did not take itself too seriously, describing it as "camp". Slant Magazine writer Sal Cinquemani was neutral about the video, noting that although Prism was being billed as a departure for Perry, both "Roar" and its video were not.

Ramon Jimenez Jr., former secretary of Philippines' Department of Tourism, highlighted the appearance of Taal Volcano in the music video. He concluded that Perry was blown away by the sight when she visited the Philippines in 2012 where she wrapped the final show of California Dreams Tour. He stated "Yes, [it is] a picture of the Philippines in what is obviously paradise. I am very happy, it's no secret that when Katy Perry went to the country, she fell in love with Philippines. I would not be surprised if she made the choice [of including Taal in the video]. [But] I do not know that for a fact."

One month after its release, People for the Ethical Treatment of Animals (PETA) accused Perry of using exotic animals in the video for "Roar". Merrilee Burke from PETA stated: "Animals used for entertainment endure horrific cruelty and suffer from extreme confinement and violent training methods." Burke also allged that the animals involved in the music video were provided by a company that was criticized by US officials. Perry responded by obtaining a letter from the American Humane Association, which had representatives present at the three-day shoot. It stated that "After reviewing the reports, we believe that the Guidelines for the Safe Use of Animals in Filmed Media were followed and that no animal was harmed in the making of this music video".

== Promotion and live performances ==
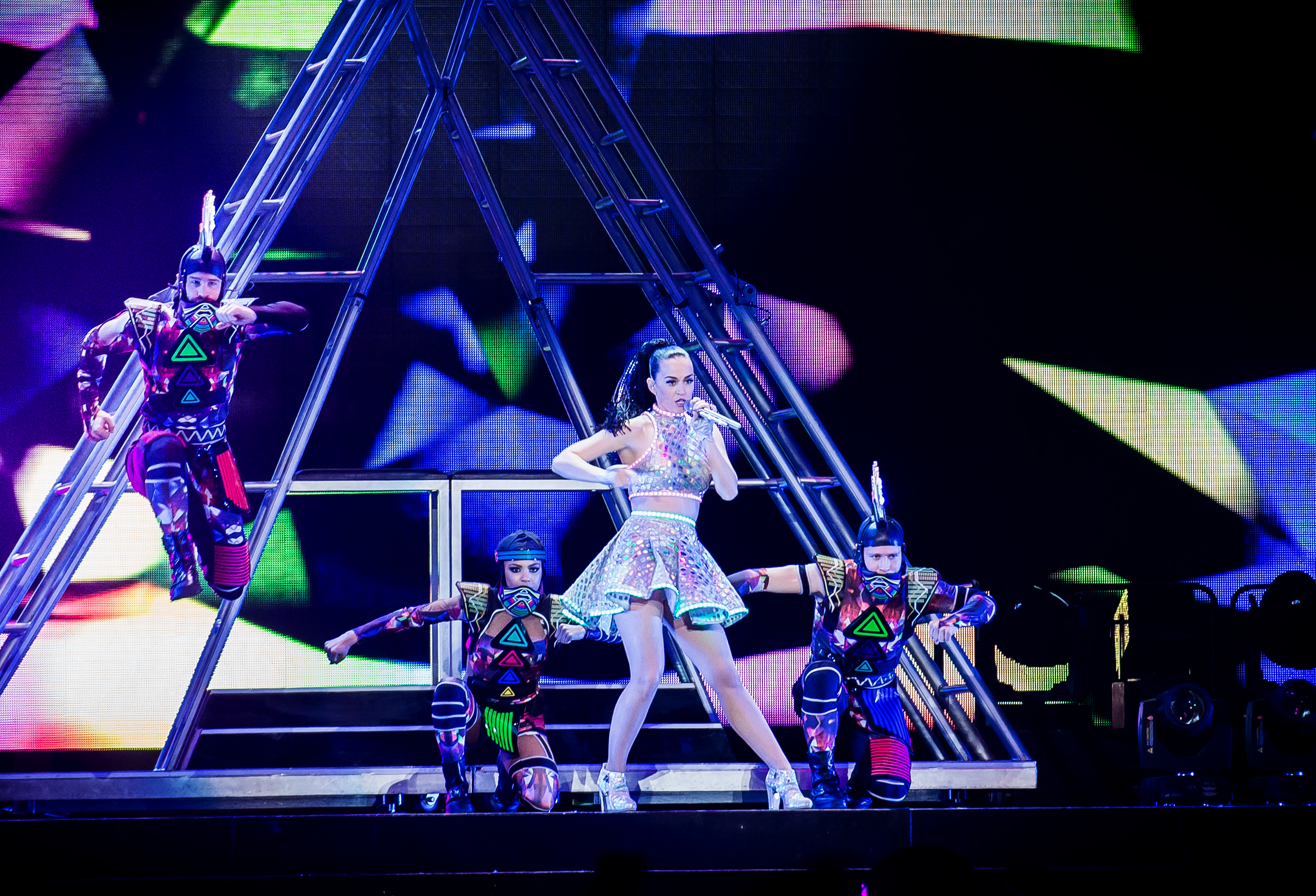
Perry performing "Roar" in Berlin

On September 16, 2013, the song was unexpectedly used during player introductions by the Cincinnati Bengals in their home opener against the rival Pittsburgh Steelers on Monday Night Football, to tie in the song's jungle theme with the team's nickname. Throughout the game, the song was also played sporadically during game breaks. Although the Bengals won the game 20–10, the song drew much criticism by Bengals fans and even some of the team's players. One Bengals fan even told the Wall Street Journal that Steeler fans sitting near him were laughing at the Bengals fans throughout the game; the Steelers themselves have used the Styx song "Renegade" frequently at Heinz Field since 2001. Four days after the game, the team publicly apologized, announcing that while the song would not be nixed from Paul Brown Stadium's playlist completely, the team would use a hard rock or classic rock song for player introductions moving forward.

"Roar" was also used as the theme song of world number 1 tennis player Serena Williams during the 2014 US Open Championships. Williams, dressed in a matching leopard-themed dress, won the championship.

== Live performances ==
Perry first performed "Roar" at the 2013 MTV Video Music Awards, in a specially-made boxing ring under the Brooklyn Bridge, at the end of the ceremony. She performed the song on Saturday Night Live on October 12, 2013. While hosting We Can Survive: Music for Life on October 23, 2013, she performed the song with Sara Bareilles, Bonnie McKee, Ellie Goulding, Kacey Musgraves, and duo Tegan and Sara. She also performed the song on the Australian version of The X Factor on October 28, 2013. Perry then performed the song the following day at the Sydney Opera House. She performed the song on German TV show Schlag den Raab on November 16, 2013. On December 14, 2013, Perry performed "Roar" at the NRJ Music Awards, but suffered technical difficulties which resulted in her performance being stopped by the host halfway through who asked for it to be restarted. This led many to believe that Perry had initially been lip-syncing the performance. NRJ later released an apology to Perry, stating that she had been singing live but that the wrong mix of the song was played over her live vocals, which resulted in her being visually out of sync with the backing track.

On May 25, 2014, Perry performed the song at BBC Radio 1's Big Weekend in Glasgow. On February 1, 2015, Perry performed the song during the Super Bowl XLIX halftime show. On July 28, 2016, she performed it at the 2016 Democratic National Convention. On May 27, 2017, Perry performed the song as her finale at BBC Radio 1's Big Weekend in Hull. On June 4, 2017, Perry performed "Roar" at the One Love Manchester benefit concert for the victims of the Manchester Arena bombing.

On May 7, 2023, Perry performed "Roar" at the Coronation Concert outside Windsor Castle in celebration of the coronation of King Charles III and Queen Camilla. On January 30, 2025, Perry performed "Roar" at Intuit Dome in Inglewood, California for FireAid to help with relief efforts for the January 2025 Southern California wildfires. On January 17, 2026, Perry performed "Roar" on Joy Awards 2026 that took place in Saudi Arabia alongside Firework and Dark Horse.

== Formats and track listings ==
CD single
No.	Title	Length
1.	"Roar"	3:42
2.	"Roar" (Instrumental)	3:42
Total length:		7:24

== Credits and personnel ==
Credits adapted from Prism album liner notes.

- Katy Perry – vocals and songwriting
- Bonnie McKee – lyrics
- Dr. Luke – songwriting and production
- Max Martin – songwriting and production
- Cirkut – songwriting and production
- Michael Ilbert – recording
- Sam Holland – recording
- Peter Carlsson – recording
- Clint Gibbs – recording
- Elliott Lanam – recording assistant
- Justin Fox – recording assistant
- Rachael Findlen – recording assistant
- John Hanes – mixing
- Serban Ghenea – mixing
- Chris Gehringer – mastering
- Irene Richter – production coordinator

== Charts ==
=== Weekly charts ===
Weekly chart performance
Chart (2013–2015)	Peak position
Australia (ARIA)	1
Austria (Ö3 Austria Top 40)	1
Belgium (Ultratop 50 Flanders)	5
Belgium (Ultratop 50 Wallonia)	6
Brazil (Billboard Brasil Hot 100)	28
Brazil Hot Pop Songs	5
Bulgaria Airplay (BAMP)	1
Canada Hot 100 (Billboard)	1
Canada AC (Billboard)	1
Canada CHR/Top 40 (Billboard)	1
Canada Hot AC (Billboard)	1
CIS Airplay (TopHit)	10
Croatia International Airplay (Top lista)	1
Czech Republic Airplay (ČNS IFPI)	2
Czech Republic Singles Digital (ČNS IFPI)	22
Denmark (Tracklisten)	2
Euro Digital Song Sales (Billboard)	1
Finland (Suomen virallinen lista)	4
Finnish Airplay (Radiosoitto)	18
France (SNEP)	5
Germany (GfK)	2
Greece Digital Songs (Billboard)	2
Hong Kong (HKRIA)	5
Hungary (Rádiós Top 40)	3
Hungary (Single Top 40)	8
Iceland (RÚV)	9
Ireland (IRMA)	1
Israel (Media Forest)	1
Italy (FIMI)	4
Japan Hot 100 (Billboard)	4
Lebanon (Lebanese Top 20)	1
Luxembourg Digital Song Sales (Billboard)	2
Mexico Anglo (Monitor Latino)	1
Netherlands (Dutch Top 40)	2
Netherlands (Single Top 100)	5
New Zealand (Recorded Music NZ)	1
Norway (VG-lista)	4
Perú (UNIMPRO)	1
Poland Airplay (ZPAV)	2
Portugal Digital Song Sales (Billboard)	5
Romania (Airplay 100)	66
Russia Airplay (TopHit)	10
Scottish Singles Sales (Official Charts)	1
Slovakia Airplay (ČNS IFPI)	2
Slovakia Singles Digital (ČNS IFPI)	81
Slovenia (SloTop50)	1
South Africa Airplay (EMA)	2
South Korea (Gaon Chart International)	1
Spain (Promusicae)	5
Sweden (Sverigetopplistan)	5
Switzerland (Schweizer Hitparade)	3
Turkey (Number One Top 20)	7
Ukraine Airplay (TopHit)	14
UK Singles (Official Charts)	1
UK Streaming Chart	1
US Billboard Hot 100	1
US Adult Contemporary (Billboard)	1
US Adult Pop Airplay (Billboard)	1
US Dance Club Songs (Billboard)	1
US Dance Airplay (Billboard)	5
US Pop Airplay (Billboard)	1
US Rhythmic Airplay (Billboard)	6
Venezuela Pop Rock (Record Report)	2

=== Monthly charts ===
Monthly chart performance
Chart (2013–2014)	Peak position
Russia Airplay (TopHit)	12
Ukraine Airplay (TopHit)	15

=== Year-end charts ===
Year-end chart performance
Chart (2013)	Position
Argentina International Digital Sales (CAPIF)	5
Australia (ARIA)	1
Austria (Ö3 Austria Top 40)	22
Belgium (Ultratop Flanders)	38
Belgium (Ultratop Wallonia)	48
Canada (Canadian Hot 100)	10
CIS (TopHit)	76
Denmark (Tracklisten)	33
France (SNEP)	30
Germany (Media Control AG)	23
Hungary (Rádiós Top 40)	25
Ireland (IRMA)	9
Italy (FIMI)	24
Italy Airplay (EarOne)	21
Japan (Japan Hot 100)	21
Mexico (Monitor Latino)	92
Netherlands (Dutch Top 40)	13
Netherlands (Single Top 100)	14
New Zealand (Recorded Music NZ)	3
Russia Airplay (TopHit)	77
South Korea (Gaon International Chart)	67
Slovenia (SloTop50)	4
Spain (PROMUSICAE)	43
Sweden (Sverigetopplistan)	38
Switzerland (Schweizer Hitparade)	29
Ukraine Airplay (TopHit)	140
UK Singles (Official Charts Company)	6
US Billboard Hot 100	10
US Adult Contemporary (Billboard)	21
US Adult Top 40 (Billboard)	20
US Dance Club Songs (Billboard)	27
US Dance/Mix Show Airplay (Billboard)	42
US Mainstream Top 40 (Billboard)	13
Worldwide Singles (IFPI)	5

Year-end chart performance
Chart (2014)	Position
Australia (ARIA)	60
Belgium (Ultratop Wallonia)	80
Canada (Canadian Hot 100)	40
CIS (TopHit)	90
France (SNEP)	119
Italy (FIMI)	81
New Zealand (Recorded Music NZ)	38
Russia Airplay (TopHit)	98
Slovenia (SloTop50)	31
Sweden (Sverigetopplistan)	93
Ukraine Airplay (TopHit)	49
UK Singles (Official Charts Company)	88
US Billboard Hot 100	46
US Adult Contemporary (Billboard)	11
US Adult Top 40 (Billboard)	39

=== Decade-end charts ===
Decade-end chart performance
Chart (2010–2019)	Position
Australia (ARIA)	7
UK Singles (Official Charts Company)	67
US Billboard Hot 100	73

== Certifications and sales ==
Region	Certification	Certified units/sales
Australia (ARIA)	22× Platinum	1,540,000^{‡}
Austria (IFPI Austria)	2× Platinum	60,000^{*}
Belgium (BRMA)	Gold	15,000^{*}
Brazil (Pro-Música Brasil)	5× Diamond	1,250,000^{‡}
Canada (Music Canada)	Diamond	800,000^{‡}
Denmark (IFPI Danmark)	Gold	15,000^{^}
Finland	7× Platinum	28,000
France (SNEP)	Diamond	333,333^{‡}
Germany (BVMI)	3× Gold	450,000^{‡}
Italy (FIMI)	2× Platinum	60,000^{‡}
Mexico (AMPROFON)	2× Platinum+Gold	150,000^{*}
New Zealand (RMNZ)	7× Platinum	210,000^{‡}
Norway (IFPI Norway)	8× Platinum	480,000^{‡}
South Korea	—	135,221 (Note: South Korea sales figures as of January 2014.)
Spain (Promusicae)	2× Platinum	120,000^{‡}
Sweden (GLF)	4× Platinum	160,000^{‡}
United Kingdom (BPI)	5× Platinum	3,000,000^{‡}
United States (RIAA)	15× Platinum	15,000,000^{‡}
Streaming
Denmark (IFPI Danmark)	2× Platinum	3,600,000^{†}
Greece (IFPI Greece)	Gold	1,000,000^{†}
Japan (RIAJ)	Gold	50,000,000^{†}
Summaries
Worldwide	—	15,000,000 (Note: Worldwide sales figures as of November 2019.)
^{*} Sales figures based on certification alone.^{^} Shipments figures based on certification alone.^{‡} Sales+streaming figures based on certification alone.^{†} Streaming-only figures based on certification alone.

== See also ==
- List of best-selling singles in Australia
- List of best-selling singles in the United States
- List of Billboard Adult Contemporary number ones of 2013
- List of Billboard Adult Contemporary number ones of 2014
- List of Billboard Dance Club Songs number ones of 2013
- List of Billboard Hot 100 number-one singles of the 2010s
