= American Idol Season 11 Highlights (Phillip Phillips EP) =

EP by Phillip Phillips
- Released: July 3, 2012
- Recorded: 2012
- Genre: Pop
- Length: 19:31
- Label: 19

Phillip Phillips chronology
American Idol Season 11 Highlights (2012)	The World from the Side of the Moon (2012)

American Idol Season 11 Highlights is a compilation extended play by Phillip Phillips based on some of his American Idol performances. The EP was released exclusively through Walmart, and consists of a few studio recordings made by Phillips during season 11 of American Idol. It includes a duet with Elise Testone, his coronation song "Home", and performances that were well received by the judges. As of September 2012, it had sold 82,000 copies.

Similar EPs were also released through Walmart by fellow contestants from the Top 5, Jessica Sanchez, Joshua Ledet, Hollie Cavanagh and Skylar Laine.

== Track listing ==
No.	Title	Original artist(s)	Length
1.	"Home"	Phillip Phillips	3:29
2.	"Superstition"	Stevie Wonder	5:13
3.	"Volcano"	Damien Rice	4:06
4.	"We've Got Tonight"	Bob Seger	4:09
5.	"Stop Draggin' My Heart Around" (featuring Elise Testone)	Stevie Nicks & Tom Petty	2:34

== Charts ==
Chart (2012)	Peak position
U.S. Billboard 200	25
