= American Idol Season 11 Top 10 Highlights =

Compilation album by Various Artists
- Released: July 3, 2012
- Recorded: 2012
- Genre: Pop
- Length: 41:48
- Label: 19

American Idol Season 11 Top 10 Highlights is a compilation album released on July 7, 2012. The album was released exclusively through Walmart and contains one cover song from each of the top 10 finalists during season 11 of the television show American Idol. As of July 2012, it has sold 4,000 copies.

It was rated 2.5 stars by AllMusic.

== Track listing ==
No.	Title	Original artist(s)	Length
1.	"It's a Man's Man's Man's World" (Joshua Ledet)	James Brown	3:23
2.	"I Will Always Love You" (Jessica Sanchez)	Dolly Parton	4:20
3.	"Volcano" (Phillip Phillips)	Damien Rice	4:06
4.	"Gunpowder & Lead" (Skylar Laine)	Miranda Lambert	2:55
5.	"Master Blaster (Jammin')" (DeAndre Brackensick)	Stevie Wonder	3:37
6.	"The Power of Love" (Hollie Cavanagh)	Jennifer Rush	4:52
7.	"New York State of Mind" (Erika Van Pelt)	Billy Joel	5:10
8.	"Whole Lotta Love" (Elise Testone)	Led Zeppelin	3:10
9.	"Everything" (Colton Dixon)	Lifehouse	5:29
10.	"A Song for You" (Heejun Han)	Leon Russell	4:51

== Charts ==
Chart (2012)	Peak position
U.S. Billboard 200	127
