= The World from the Side of the Moon =

Studio album by Phillip Phillips
- Released: November 19, 2012
- Genre: Pop rock
- Length: 45:18
- Label: 19 Recordings
- Producers: Drew Pearson; Gregg Wattenberg

Phillip Phillips chronology
American Idol Season 11 Highlights (2012)	The World from the Side of the Moon (2012)	Behind the Light (2014)

Singles from The World from the Side of the Moon
- 1. "Home" Released: May 23, 2012; 2. "Gone, Gone, Gone" Released: February 11, 2013; 3. "Where We Came From" Released: July 29, 2013

The World from the Side of the Moon is the debut album by American rock band Phillip Phillips. It was released on November 19, 2012 by 19 Recordings, and includes Phillips' coronation song, "Home". The album was certified Platinum by the Recording Industry Association of America in August 2013.

The album spawned two hit singles "Home" and "Gone, Gone, Gone", both singles charted the U.S. Billboard Hot 100 and hit number-one on the Adult Contemporary chart for more than three weeks. Both "Home" and "Gone, Gone, Gone" also received certifications from the Recording Industry Association of America (RIAA); "Home" received quadruple-platinum certification, while "Gone, Gone, Gone" received Platinum.

== Background ==
Phillip Phillips, the winner of American Idol season 11, began writing songs with collaborators and recording rough tracks for the album before the American Idol Tour started in July 2012. He collaborated with David Ryan Harris on "Tell Me a Story", which he described as his favorite song in the album and the one he is most proud of. Other songwriters he collaborated with include Greg Holden and Drew Pearson who wrote his coronation song "Home". After the success of this song, Phillips indicated that the album would have a couple of songs similar to "Home". He wrote with his brother-in-law Benjamin Neil "Drive Me", a song he had originally wanted to be his coronation song. His girlfriend Hanna Blackwell also contributed lines to the lyrics on the bonus track "Take Me Away". All but three of the tracks on the main album were written or co-written by him, with four of the songs he wrote himself. He cowrote "Get Up Get Down" with the producer Greg Wattenberg and Derek Fuhrmann in Wattenberg's New York studio. Songs selected by 19 were presented to him but some were discarded, amongst those he chose were "Gone, Gone, Gone".

The album title came from the lyrics of the first song on the album, "Man on the Moon". Phillips described it as the experience of watching himself in a DVD of the whole Idol season someone gave him, "so I was kind of watching myself from a whole different world that no one else really knows. It's interesting to see how it happened and so fast. That's how I picked the title: I felt like I watched myself grow and this whole album is representing where I am."

The producer of the album was Gregg Wattenberg. The album was recorded in three weeks at the Quad Studios in New York after the Idol tour had finished. He had originally planned to release his album early 2013, but later the date of the album release was rescheduled to November 19, 2012.

The album was an expanded version of his "Moon" album was released. It included three live recordings, including "Gone, Gone, Gone", "Where We Came From", and "Man on the Moon". Those three tracks were also on Phillip Phillips Live EP, also out on November 19.

== Critical reception ==
Professional ratings
Aggregate scores
Source	Rating
Metacritic	61/100
Review scores
Source	Rating
AbsolutePunk.net	84%
AllMusic	2.5/5 stars
Billboard	71/100
Entertainment Weekly	(B)
HitFix	(B)
Idolator	4/5 stars
Newsday	(B)
Rolling Stone	2.5/5 stars
Slant Magazine	2.5/5 stars

The World from the Side of the Moon has received mixed to positive reviews from professional music critics, and has an overall Metacritic rating of 61 indicating "generally favorable reviews". Most critics noted influences from Dave Matthews Band and Mumford & Sons in the album. Glenn Gamboa of Newsday opined that Phillips "offers up Dave Matthews Band's jamming-blues-rock hybrid to a younger generation in "Get Up Get Down," while also giving the indie-leaning folk of current darlings Mumford & Sons an attractive American face in "Gone Gone Gone."" Gary Graff of Billboard noted that Phillips' song "Home", "aligned him with the Mumford & Sons nu-folk movement," but considered "the album actually plays out more like the year's second-best Dave Matthews Band release." Stephen Thomas Erlewine of Allmusic thought the similarities to Dave Matthews Band to be "near farcical," and the similarities to other bands led Jody Rosen of Rolling Stone to wonder if Phillips is redundant "when we've already got Dave Matthews and Jason Mraz, why do we need another earnestly raspy balladeer with ace acoustic-guitar skills?" Rosen nevertheless thought that "he's far better in originals like "Gone, Gone, Gone" and his hit "Home," which build from folksy picking to hooting power-ballad choruses, a pleasantly popified take on Arcade Fire."

Emily Tan of Idolator was enthusiastic and thought that the album "showcases Phillips’ potential as a musician, singer and songwriter who can rise above the generic pop that these reality competitions sometimes spawn." Katie Hasty of HitFix considered that "this collection is shot after shot at the Next Big Single," and added that "some melodies will achieve exactly the radio single sound Universal undoubtedly hoped Phillips could achieve." Kristin Coachman of Blogcritics.org commented that Phillips in the album "reflects every bit of the gravelly voiced pop rock artist, with jazz leanings that he portrayed during his Idol run." Grady Smith of Entertainment Weekly viewed the songs written by Phillips alone to be "more circuitous, brooding" and "less compelling" than those he co-wrote with other songwriters, but nevertheless concluded that the album is "the most relevant debut album the Idol machine has cranked out in years."

== Chart performance ==
The album debuted at No. 4 in the Billboard 200 with sales of 169,000 copies, and it stayed for seven weeks in the top 10 on The Billboard 200. It also debuted at No. 1 in the Rock Albums and No. 2 in the Digital Albums charts. It was certified Gold by the RIAA on January 9, 2013, and Platinum on August 21, 2013. The album has sold 1,033,000 copies as of November, 2013. It was on the Billboard Top 200 album chart for 61 weeks. That puts in #2 of all the debut albums by American Idol winners.

In Canada, the album reached No. 9 in its album chart on its debut. The album was certified gold in Canada on January 17, 2013.

== Singles ==
Phillip Phillips' coronation song "Home", which was released in May 2012 straight after the finale of American Idol, was included in his album. The song was still rising in the radio chart before the album was released, therefore no other single was released in advance of the album release. Instead, "Where We Came From" was released for promotional purpose on November 6, 2012, before the album debut, and it also served as a free download on the album's pre-order.

In December 2012, Phillips revealed that "Gone Gone Gone" would be the second single. The song was released to AAA and HAC radio on February 11, 2013, and U.S. Mainstream Top 40 radio on May 28, 2013.

"Where We Came From" was the third single from the album. It was released to radio on July 29, 2013, and debuted on the AAA chart in August 2013. The music video was filmed in August 2013 by director Cameron Buddy.

== Track listing ==
No.	Title	Writer(s)	Producer(s)	Length
1.	"Man on the Moon"	Phillip Phillips	Gregg Wattenberg	3:35
2.	"Home"	Drew Pearson; Greg Holden	Pearson	3:30
3.	"Gone, Gone, Gone"	Wattenberg; Derek Fuhrmann; Todd Clark	Wattenberg	3:29
4.	"Hold On"	Phillips	Wattenberg	4:11
5.	"Tell Me a Story"	Phillips; David Ryan Harris	Wattenberg	4:21
6.	"Get Up Get Down"	Phillips; Wattenberg; Fuhrmann	Wattenberg	3:16
7.	"Where We Came From"	Phillips; Jon Green	Wattenberg	3:33
8.	"Drive Me"	Phillips; Ben Neil	Wattenberg	3:49
9.	"Wanted Is Love"	Phillips	Wattenberg	3:46
10.	"Can't Go Wrong"	Phillips; Holden; Pearson	Wattenberg	3:37
11.	"A Fool's Dance"	Phillips	Wattenberg	4:33
12.	"So Easy"	Peter Amato; Pete Sallis; Stephen Wrabel	Wattenberg	3:41
Total length:				45:18

Deluxe edition bonus tracks
No.	Title	Writer(s)	Producer(s)	Length
13.	"Hazel"	Phillips	Wattenberg	2:45
14.	"Wicked Game"	Chris Isaak	Wattenberg	4:13
15.	"Home" (Live)	Pearson; Holden		4:18

Spotify/Apple Music/iTunes Deluxe edition bonus tracks
No.	Title	Writer(s)	Length
16.	"Gone, Gone, Gone" (Live from Saratoga Springs, NY - SPAC 8/30/13)	Wattenberg; Derek Fuhrmann; Todd Clark	6:17
17.	"Man on the Moon" (Live from Saratoga Springs, NY - SPAC 8/30/13)	Phillip Phillips	5:10
18.	"Where We Came From" (Live from Burgettstown, PA - First Niagra 8/25/13)	Phillips; Jon Green	7:18

Target deluxe edition bonus tracks
No.	Title	Writer(s)	Length
16.	"Take Me Away"	Phillips, Hannah Blackwell	5:38
17.	"Thriller"	Rod Temperton	4:00

== Charts and certifications ==
=== Weekly charts ===
Chart (2012–13)	Peak position
Australian Albums (ARIA)	59
Canadian Albums (Billboard)	6
New Zealand Albums (RMNZ)	32
US Billboard 200	4
US Top Rock Albums (Billboard)	1

Chart (2014)	Peak position
Scottish Albums (Official Charts)	48
UK Albums (Official Charts)	58

=== Year-end charts ===
Chart (2013)	Position
Canadian Albums (Billboard)	18
US Billboard 200	14
US Top Rock Albums (Billboard)	4

=== Decade-end charts ===
Chart (2010–2019)	Position
US Billboard 200	126
US Top Rock Albums (Billboard)	49

=== Certifications ===
Region	Certification	Certified units/sales
Canada (Music Canada)	Platinum	80,000^{^}
United States (RIAA)	Platinum	1,033,000
^{^} Shipments figures based on certification alone.

== Release history ==
Phillips ran a very limited-time promotion during which fans could order the deluxe version of the album, and he would personally sign the booklet. The promotion ended only a few hours after it began. Interscope announced that the album will be rereleased with additional live tracks on the anniversary of its release, November 19, 2013.

List of release dates, showing region, label, format and edition(s)
Region	Date	Format(s)	Label	Edition(s)
United States	November 19, 2012	CD, digital download	Interscope Records, 19 Recordings	Standard, deluxe
United Kingdom	September 8, 2014	CD, digital download	Interscope Records, 19 Recordings	Standard, deluxe
