= Gone, Gone, Gone (Phillip Phillips song) =

Single by Phillip Phillips

from the album The World from the Side of the Moon
- Released: February 11, 2013
- Recorded: 2012
- Genre: Pop rock; folk rock
- Length: 3:29
- Label: Interscope
- Songwriters: Derek Fuhrmann; Todd Clark; Gregg Wattenberg
- Producer: Gregg Wattenberg

Phillip Phillips singles chronology
"Home" (2012)	"Gone, Gone, Gone" (2013)	"Where We Came From" (2013)

Music video
- "Gone, Gone, Gone" on YouTube

"Gone, Gone, Gone" is a song recorded by American recording artist Phillip Phillips from his debut album The World from the Side of the Moon. It was released on February 11, 2013, by Interscope Records as the second single from the album. The song was co-written by Derek Fuhrmann, Todd Clark, and Gregg Wattenberg, Wattenberg also produced the song himself. "Gone, Gone, Gone" became a commercial success in the United States as it was certified platinum by the Recording Industry Association of America (RIAA), and has sold more than two million digital copies since its release.

== Background and composition ==
The song was co-written by Derek Fuhrmann, formerly of Omnisoul, Todd Clark, and Gregg Wattenberg. Phillips revealed on December 19, 2012 to Yahoo Canada Music that the second single would be "Gone, Gone, Gone".

It’s a good little love song. Todd Clark and Derek Fuhrmann, they wrote [it] and brought it to me and I thought it was a beautiful song. The more I’ve played it live, the more I’ve made it more my own and people seem to really connect with it and really enjoy it so I’m excited to see how that song’s going to do." - Phillip Phillips

The sheet music for the song is published in F♯ major, with a tempo of 116-120 beats per minute.

== Critical reception ==
"Gone, Gone, Gone" received positive reviews from music critics. Music blog POP! Goes The Charts stated that "it's a solid recording... a much stronger release than "Home"," comparing the arrangement to the John Butler Trio.

Lynsey Parker of Yahoo Music wrote that, as a "rousing folk-rock anthem filled with stompy marching-band beats, chanty choruses, winsome guitars, and declarations of undying loyalty, "Gone, Gone, Gone" is arguably just as catchy as "Home," if not more so."

Digital Journal called it "a breath of fresh air", while Grady Smith of Entertainment Weekly thought the song "melodic and memorable and could easily cement Phillips’ status as a relevant 2013 artist".

Simon Cleary of musicinsideu.com praised the lyrical content of the song which he described as being about "the backbone, the cornerstone of true love," and added that "not many people still dare to believe this kind of love exists anymore. Even fewer believe it's possible for them to live true love. Phillip's got the courage to believe, and to live, and to love."

== Chart performance ==
"Gone, Gone Gone" reached No. 12 in the Billboard Bubbling Under chart when Phillip Phillips' debut album, The World from the Side of the Moon, was released on November 19, 2012. It sold 31,000 copies for the week. The song was released to HAC and AAA radio stations on February 11, 2013, and it entered the Billboard Hot 100 at No.100 on March 13, 2013. It climbed to No. 59 the next week after Phillips performed the song on the twelfth season of American Idol which saw its weekly downloads boosted by 257% to 65,000. It reached No. 1 in the AAA chart in April 2013, the Triple A Audience chart, as well as the recurrent AAA chart in July 2013. The song was No. 1 in a total of eight Billboard charts. "Gone, Gone, Gone" peaked at position #24 on the Billboard Hot 100. On August 26, 2013, "Gone, Gone, Gone" became Phillips' second No. 1 on the Adult Contemporary chart, making him one of the few solo males to take their first two Adult Contemporary chart entries to No. 1.

The song sold its first million copies by July 2013, and was certified platinum by the Recording Industry Association of America on August 1, 2013. It reached its 2 million sales mark in May 2014.

== Music video ==
The music video was directed by Joseph Toman and was shot in Springfield, Missouri and Palm Springs, Los Angeles. The video premiered on Phillips's Vevo site on February 15, 2013.

The video starts with the stuttering frames of home movie as it begins to play, and Phillips going on a stroll at sunset. It interspersed shots of Phillips singing with grainy home video footage spanning decades to tell the story of love and family and the human experience. "I wanted the video to feel generational, not just about the present, but the people before us that paved the way," says the director, "It's a celebration of life, and hopefully a piece that everyone can find something in to relate to."

== Live performances ==
On January 16, 2013, Phillip Phillips performed the song on The Ellen DeGeneres Show and Jimmy Kimmel Live! to coincide with the twelfth season premiere of American Idol. Phillips performed the song on the March 14 results show on the twelfth season of American Idol. He subsequently performed the song on a number of television shows, including NBC's Today and The Tonight Show with Jay Leno. He was also invited to the pregame show for Super Bowl XLVIII where the song was performed.

== In popular culture ==
"Gone Gone Gone" was used in a campaign by Do Something and VH1 to rally young people to create a crowd-sourced music video. The best user-submitted videos were mixed into a Band Together cover of the song released on YouTube.

"Gone Gone Gone" was used in the 2013 films Grudge Match, Delivery Man including on its TV spots, and in the 2014 superhero film The Amazing Spider-Man 2.

== Charts ==
=== Weekly charts ===
Chart (2012–14)	Peak position
Canada Hot 100 (Billboard)	28
US Billboard Hot 100	24
US Hot Rock & Alternative Songs (Billboard)	3
US Adult Alternative Airplay (Billboard)	1
US Adult Contemporary (Billboard)	1
US Adult Pop Airplay (Billboard)	3
US Pop Airplay (Billboard)	18
US Rock & Alternative Airplay (Billboard)	35

=== Year-end charts ===
Chart (2013)	Position
Canada (Canadian Hot 100)	65
US Billboard Hot 100	61
US Hot Rock Songs (Billboard)	10
US Adult Alternative Songs (Billboard)	16
US Adult Contemporary (Billboard)	9
US Adult Top 40 (Billboard)	4
Chart (2014)	Position
US Adult Contemporary (Billboard)	29

== Certifications ==
Region	Certification	Certified units/sales
Brazil (Pro-Música Brasil)	Platinum	60,000^{‡}
Canada (Music Canada)	Platinum	80,000^{*}
United Kingdom (BPI)	Silver	200,000^{‡}
United States (RIAA)	Platinum	2,000,000
^{*} Sales figures based on certification alone.^{‡} Sales+streaming figures based on certification alone.

== Release history ==
Country	Date	Format	Label
United States	February 11, 2013	Adult album alternative, Adult contemporary music	Interscope Records
United States	May 28, 2013	Top 40/Mainstream radio	Interscope Records

== See also ==
- List of number-one adult contemporary singles of 2013 (U.S.)
