= Home (Phillip Phillips song) =

Single by Phillip Phillips

from the album The World from the Side of the Moon
- Released: May 23, 2012
- Recorded: 2012
- Genre: Folk rock
- Length: 3:30
- Label: Interscope
- Songwriters: Greg Holden; Drew Pearson
- Producer: Drew Pearson

Phillip Phillips singles chronology
"Home" (2012)	"Gone, Gone, Gone" (2013)

Music video
- "Phillip Phillips - Home" on YouTube

"Home" is the debut single and coronation song from American Idol season 11 winner Phillip Phillips. The song was co-written by Drew Pearson and Greg Holden, and produced by Pearson. Phillips first performed the song on the season's final performance night on May 22, 2012, and then again on the finale after he was declared the winner. His recording of "Home" was released as a single on May 23, 2012 and included as a track on the compilations American Idol Season Finale - Season 11 EP and Journey to the Finale released at the same time. The song was also included on his debut album, The World from the Side of the Moon, released that November.

The single debuted at No. 10 on the Billboard Hot 100 with a first week sales figure of 278,000 downloads. It has the biggest digital sales week for any Idol winner's coronation song, and it became the best selling of all coronation songs, as well as the best-selling song by any Idol alum in the United States. It has sold over 5 million copies in the United States.

== Background ==
The song was written by Drew Pearson and Greg Holden, and chosen by Jimmy Iovine as a coronation song for the eventual winner of Season 11 of American Idol, Phillip Phillips. According to Drew Pearson, it was originally intended for Greg Holden, but was submitted to Idol as a possible finale number by Pearson's publishing company, Pulse Recordings. Pearson and Holden had previously not met before but were brought together to write the song, with Holden the primary lyricist. The song was written in three hours in Pearson's studio in Burbank, California in November 2011. Originally it had only two verses, but an arrangement change was made about a month after it was written, and the second verse was repeated. Pearson cited Mumford & Sons, Arcade Fire, and a few Irish bands as influences for the song. A demo was recorded, and Holden had performed the song in his tour, but he expressed no intention of releasing his recording of the song. According to Holden, the song is about a friend who was going through a very difficult time, and it was his way of reaching out and saying that "you know someone's here for you".

After the release of the song, Phillips said that while the song and its writers are "really good", "it's not really something I would write". He also revealed that he had wanted to use a song he co-wrote with his brother-in-law, "Drive Me," as the coronation song. In interviews after the finale, he said, "The song that I did tonight that supposedly is my single, it's not really my single, I told them it's not my single." He also said, "I have my own stories to tell," and added "[but] I couldn’t do my song [on the finale]; we just didn’t have enough time." Philip stated that he writes songs in the "jazz and rock alternative sound; not really rock-rock." Phillips said that "I didn't have time to let it grow and become my own before we recorded it"." Later he said he was "starting to grow a connection" with the song, and that "I kind of sing it like me, and on the guitar I do some different strummings on some parts, so it's coming along."

== Composition ==
The song is written in the key of C major with a bright tempo.

== Reception ==
=== Critical ===
"Phillip Phillips - Home"
A 20 second sound sample of "Home" .

The song "Home" was well-received when it was first performed on American Idol. Phillips received a standing ovation—the only one of the night—from the judges. Randy Jackson said, "Dude, I loved the song, I love you, I loved the production, I loved the marching band--everything about that was perfect!" Jennifer Lopez said, "That was a Phillip song and there is nothing on the radio that sounds like that!" and Steven Tyler offered the opinion that, "By virtue of your vulnerability and style, you made the world your home."

Professional reviewers have praised the song unanimously, calling it one of the best American Idol coronation songs of all time. Popdust gave it a good review, saying, "it runs with the necessary thematic elements needed to market someone who came from a reality competition show, while picking up more interesting styles that focus on instrumentals and arrangement in addition to vocals." American Songwriter thought that the song "has all the elements of a current hit: British folksiness, anthemic marching-band-ness, rootsy singalong", and suggested that Phillips "got lucky with a pretty good [song]".

EW Music Mix gave the song an A−, and likened it to Mumford & Sons and Fleet Foxes. They added, "The triumphant track is easily the coolest, most relevant song ever used as a reality TV coronation song." Vulture's blog critic also noted the song's similarity to Mumford & Sons, and that it reminded him of Edward Sharpe and the Magnetic Zeros's song also called "Home". He was enthusiastic about the song and thought that "when the drumline walks out onstage...it hits a groove and becomes the first of these Idol winner songs I can actually imagine becoming a hit song." The influence of Mumford & Sons in the song led its band member Ben Lovett to wonder if they had recorded the song when he first heard it.

Spin, who titled their post "'American Idol' Shocker: Phillip Phillips' Coronation Song 'Home' Doesn't Suck", called the tune "shockingly good — especially for an Idol coronation song, which have a tendency to be horrifyingly embarrassing."

=== Commercial ===
"Home" debuted on the Billboard Hot 100 at No. 10, the first time in four years a coronation single from an American Idol winner has reached the top 10. David Cook's single "The Time of My Life" debuted at No. 3 in the week ending May 25, 2008. "Home" sold 278,000 the first week, the biggest digital sales week ever for a winner's coronation song, surpassing David Cook's "Time of My Life," which had first week sales of 236,000 in 2008. It is also the second-best digital sales week ever for any "Idol" contestant, behind Kelly Clarkson's 2009 song "My Life Would Suck Without You" which sold 280,000 in its debut week.

The song was later used in the NBC women's gymnastics coverage of the 2012 Summer Olympics, and the song re-entered the Hot 100 at 84 on August 1 on the strength of a one-night boost in sales after its first airing. The song then sold over 105,000 copies in a three-day span the next week, and totalled 228,000 for the week. It also re-entered the Top 10 and reached a new high of No. 9 in the Hot 100 chart the same week, the first song to reach the Hot 100's Top 10 in separate chart runs in a single calendar year. The following week its sales exceeded a million. The song hit No. 1 on 11 separate Billboard charts, including Rock Digital Songs, Hot Digital Songs, Hot Digital Tracks, adult alternative Triple A, Triple A Audience, Adult Top 40, and Adult Contemporary. The song reached a new peak at No. 8 in the Hot 100 chart in the week his album The World from the Side of the Moon debuted in the Billboard 200 chart in November. It climbed to No. 7 a week later, dropped to No. 8 and No. 9 in subsequent weeks in December and January, then resumed its ascent to a new peak at No. 6 in mid-January 2013. Together with increasing radioplay, it again started posting sales of more than 100,000 units per week from mid-November until late February 2013. This song reached its 5 million sales mark in the US in March 2014. As of December 2015, the song has sold 5,400,000 copies in the US.

== Music video ==
The music video was directed by Joseph Toman and was shot over three days (July 14–16) while on the road with the American Idol tour, traveling from Denver to Salt Lake City. The video premiered on Phillip Phillips' Vevo site on August 2, 2012. Much of the video interweaves black-and-white imagery of American landscapes with footage of Phillips jamming on the tour bus.

The purpose of the video, according to the director, was to "make something that felt real and show people who Phillip really is", to "give a sense of journey, both for the viewer and the star", and "the idea of feeling home, at peace, even when you can't actually be 'home.' "

== In popular culture ==
Phillips performed this song during the 36th Annual Capitol Fourth on July 4, 2012. The song quickly became a song popularly used as backing soundtrack in films, television shows, and commercials. It appeared in the trailer for the film Trouble with the Curve, the trailer for the 2014 Disneynature film Bears, as well as the ending credits of Parental Guidance and Monster Trucks. It was in a television commercial for Extreme Makeover: Home Edition, played at the end of Suburgatory episode "Krampus," and was performed as a mash-up with Simon & Garfunkel's "Homeward Bound" on Glee. The song was used in a number of commercials – it was first used in a commercial for American Family Insurance in the US, then Vizio, Coldwell Banker, Mazda, and Walmart. It was also used by Tim Hortons in their advertisement for their new Tassimo T-discs in Canada, and by Vax in the United Kingdom.

On April 17, 2013, two days after the Boston Marathon bombing, the song was used in a photo montage dedicated to the first responders, as part of the pre-game ceremony before the Boston Bruins game against the Buffalo Sabres at the TD Garden, in Boston, Massachusetts. The song was also used to close out the 2014 Dinesh D'Souza film America: Imagine the World Without Her in a 3-minute sequence celebrating the values of United States.

In 2016, the song was used in the US version of The Passion. It is sung by Jencarlos and Prince Royce, and appears on the official soundtrack album.

In November 2020, the song was among 20 songs that President Barack Obama said defined his presidency.

=== Use in the Olympics ===
NBC featured "Home" during segments profiling the U.S. women's gymnastics team during its coverage of the 2012 United States Olympic Trials and the 2012 Summer Olympics. The song had been introduced to NBC's Olympics producer David Michaels (brother of Al Michaels) by his daughter Megan. She was in turn, contacted by Phillips' manager Myles Lewis from 19 Entertainment, who referred him to Michaels to coordinate its use. The usage of the song by NBC caused "Home" to experience a major resurgence in sales.

In response, Phillips commented that "It's an honor for them to use that song, and I'm so proud of it and how well it has done."

== Charts ==
=== Weekly charts ===
Chart (2012–2013)	Peak position
Australia (ARIA)	56
Belgium (Ultratip Bubbling Under Flanders)	11
Belgium (Ultratip Bubbling Under Wallonia)	26
Canada Hot 100 (Billboard)	6
Czech Republic Airplay (ČNS IFPI)	47
Japan Hot 100 (Billboard)	70
Netherlands (Single Top 100)	76
New Zealand (Recorded Music NZ)	28
UK Singles (Official Charts)	60
US Billboard Hot 100	6
US Hot Rock & Alternative Songs (Billboard)	2
US Adult Alternative Airplay (Billboard)	1
US Adult Contemporary (Billboard)	1
US Adult Pop Airplay (Billboard)	1
US Alternative Airplay (Billboard)	39
US Pop Airplay (Billboard)	8
US Rock & Alternative Airplay (Billboard)	26

=== Year-end charts ===
Chart (2012)	Position
US Billboard Hot 100	49
US Adult Contemporary (Billboard)	37
US Adult Top 40 (Billboard)	28

Chart (2013)	Position
Canada (Canadian Hot 100)	25
US Billboard Hot 100	46
US Adult Contemporary (Billboard)	4
US Adult Top 40 (Billboard)	22
US Hot Rock Songs (Billboard)	9
US Adult Alternative Songs (Billboard)	18

=== All-time charts ===
Chart	Position
US Adult Pop Songs (Billboard)	46

== Certifications ==
Region	Certification	Certified units/sales
Brazil (Pro-Música Brasil)	Platinum	60,000^{‡}
Canada (Music Canada)	4× Platinum	320,000^{*}
New Zealand (RMNZ)	Gold	7,500^{*}
United States (RIAA)	4× Platinum	5,400,000
^{*} Sales figures based on certification alone.^{‡} Sales+streaming figures based on certification alone.

== Release history ==
Region	Date
United States	May 23, 2012
Italy	February 15, 2013
United Kingdom	June 3, 2013

== See also ==
- List of number-one digital songs of 2012 (U.S.)
- List of Adult Top 40 number-one singles of 2012
- List of Billboard Adult Contemporary number ones of 2013
