= Phillip Phillips =

American singer

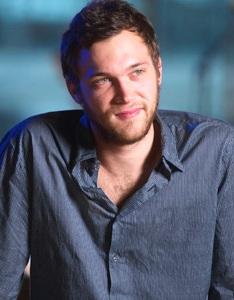
- Phillips at the Walmart Soundcheck; December 2013

Background information
- Born: Phillip LaDon Phillips Jr. September 20, 1990 (age 36); Albany, Georgia, U.S.
- Origin: Leesburg, Georgia, U.S.
- Genres: Pop rock; folk rock
- Occupations: Singer; musician; songwriter
- Instruments: Vocals; guitar
- Years active: 2012–present
- Labels: 19; Interscope
- Website: www.phillipphillips.com

Phillip LaDon Phillips Jr. (born September 20, 1990) is an American singer-songwriter who rose to fame after winning the eleventh season of American Idol in 2012. His coronation song, "Home", became the best-selling coronation song in American Idol history.

His debut album The World from the Side of the Moon was released on November 19, 2012, and was on the Billboard 200 album chart for 61 weeks. It has been certified Platinum by the RIAA. The album included the singles "Home" and "Gone, Gone, Gone". He followed up with Behind the Light, in 2014 with the singles "Raging Fire" and "Unpack Your Heart". His third album, Collateral, was released in 2018 and included the song "Miles". Phillip Phillips fourth studio album Drift Back was released in June 2023 and it included the single "Dancing with Your Shadows". Phillips toured with John Mayer, Gavin DeGraw, the Goo Goo Dolls, and has shared the stage with Bruce Springsteen.

Phillips has sold over 7.8 million digital singles and has sold over 3 million album equivalents. He accumulated over 1.1 billion on-demand streams and over 1.2 billion Pandora streams.

== Early life ==
Phillip Phillips was born in Albany, Georgia, to Sheryl Jean (née Jacks) and Phillip LaDon "Donnie" Phillips, Sr. He moved with his family to Leesburg, Georgia when he was 12. He has two older sisters, LaDonna, the eldest, and Lacey. Phillips grew up in Sasser and Leesburg, and attended Lee County High School. He graduated from Albany Technical College with a major in Industrial Systems Technology, but missed the graduation ceremony due to his obligations to American Idol. Prior to appearing on American Idol, he worked at his family's pawn shop.

Phillips started playing music, particularly the guitar, when he was 14. He was mentored by his long-time friend and brother-in-law, Benjamin Neil, whom he credits for piquing his interest in music. In 2009, he formed the Phillip Phillips Band with Neil and another brother-in-law, Todd Urick, and performed in various local venues and events. He won a local singing competition, "Albany Star", in 2010.

Phillips' favorite singer is Jonny Lang. Other favorites include John Butler, Dave Matthews, and Damien Rice. He also enjoyed Mumford & Sons and Tool. He grew up listening mainly to '60s and '70s music such as Jimi Hendrix and Led Zeppelin; "Then as I got older I found Damien Rice and Dave Matthews and John Butler, which is what really set it off for me in terms of finding my voice as a musician." He has described his music as "jazz and rock alternative sound".

Prior to trying out for American Idol, Phillips also auditioned on the second season of America's Got Talent.

== American Idol ==
=== Overview ===
Phillips auditioned in Savannah, Georgia. He sang "Superstition" by Stevie Wonder. One of the show's executive producers, Megan Michaels-Wolflick, stated "I remember the day in Savannah in 2011 when Phillip Phillips walked in the room and I thought, "This guy is going to win this season." As he walked in front of American Idol judges for his initial audition, Steven Tyler whispered to Jennifer Lopez, "I got a funny feeling about this." The judges asked him to perform a second song with his guitar, and he performed Michael Jackson's "Thriller". He advanced to the Hollywood rounds, and later to the Las Vegas round.

On February 23, 2012, Phillips was chosen as one of the Top 25 semi-finalists, and was voted into the Top 13.

His performance style on the show has been compared to Dave Matthews, and he covered one of his songs, "The Stone", in the competition. When asked about Phillips' imitation of his style, Dave Matthews said: "More power to him, I don't mind," and added "He should kick my ass, [then] maybe I can retire and he can take over my band." Mentor Stevie Nicks said Phillips would have been good enough to join Fleetwood Mac back in 1975, after his performance of Jonny Lang's "Still Rainin", for which he received a standing ovation from the judges.

After the Top 13 performance night, Phillips was taken to a doctor for possible kidney stones. He had eight procedures while he was performing on Idol, and considered quitting the show due to the pain.

For his Top 3 performance, Phillips sang Bob Seger's "We've Got Tonight". For Top 4, he did a cover of Damien Rice's "Volcano" - which has been heralded as one of the best American Idol performances of all time. As the sole contestant who was never in jeopardy of elimination in any week of the competition, Phillips became the winner on the finale against Jessica Sanchez after a record-breaking 132 million votes were cast. His coronation song, "Home", was released after his performance, and had the biggest digital sales week for any Idol winner's coronation song.

Phillips said, "It was crazy and it changed my life completely. I didn't know what to expect, I just loved playing music." "It never seemed like a competition. I always made sure I was having fun and the band was having a good time."

American Idol season 11 performances and results
Episode	Theme	Song choice	Original artist	Order #	Result
Audition	Auditioner's Choice	"Superstition"	Stevie Wonder	N/A	Advanced
Audition	Auditioner's Choice	"Thriller"	Michael Jackson	N/A	Advanced
Hollywood 1	First Solo	"Papa's Got a Brand New Bag"	James Brown	N/A	Advanced
Hollywood 2	Group Performance	"Broken Strings" with Heejun Han, Richie Law and Jairon Jackson	James Morrison feat. Nelly Furtado	N/A	Advanced
Hollywood 3	Second Solo	"Wicked Game"	Chris Isaak	N/A	Advanced
Las Vegas	Songs of the 1950s Group Performance	"I Only Have Eyes for You" with Neco Starr, Jairon Jackson and Heejun Han	Dick Powell & Ruby Keeler	N/A	Advanced
Final Judgment	Final Solo	"Nice & Slow"	Usher	N/A	Advanced
Top 25 (13 Men)	Personal Choice	"In the Air Tonight"	Phil Collins	9	Advanced
Top 13	Stevie Wonder	"Superstition"	Stevie Wonder	13	Safe
Top 11	Year They Were Born	"Hard to Handle"	Otis Redding	1	Safe
Top 10	Billy Joel	"Movin' Out (Anthony's Song)"	Billy Joel	6	Safe
Top 9	Their Personal Idols	Trio "Landslide" / "Edge of Seventeen" / "Don't Stop" with Colton Dixon & Elise Testone	Fleetwood Mac / Stevie Nicks	3	Safe
Top 9	Their Personal Idols	Solo "Still Rainin'"	Jonny Lang	9	Safe
Top 8	Songs from the 1980s	Solo "That's All"	Genesis	4	Safe
Top 8	Songs from the 1980s	Duet "Stop Draggin' My Heart Around" with Elise Testone	Stevie Nicks & Tom Petty	8	Safe
Top 7	Songs from the 2010s	Duet "Somebody That I Used to Know" with Elise Testone	Gotye feat. Kimbra	3	Safe
Top 7	Songs from the 2010s	Solo "Give a Little More"	Maroon 5	8	Safe
Top 7^{1}	Songs from Now & Then	"U Got It Bad"	Usher	4	Safe
Top 7^{1}	Songs from Now & Then	"In the Midnight Hour"	Wilson Pickett	11	Safe
Top 6	Queen	"Fat Bottomed Girls"	Queen	5	Safe
Top 6	Contestant's Choice	"The Stone"	Dave Matthews Band	11	Safe
Top 5	Songs from the 1960s	Solo "The Letter"	The Box Tops	2	Safe
Top 5	Songs from the 1960s	Duet "You've Lost That Lovin' Feelin'" with Joshua Ledet	The Righteous Brothers	4	Safe
Top 5	British Pop	"Time of the Season"	The Zombies	8	Safe
Top 4	California Dreamin'	Solo "Have You Ever Seen the Rain?"	Creedence Clearwater Revival	1	Safe
Top 4	California Dreamin'	Duet "This Love" with Joshua Ledet	Maroon 5	5	Safe
Top 4	California Dreamin'	Quartet "Waiting for a Girl Like You" with Hollie Cavanagh, Joshua Ledet & Jessica Sanchez	Foreigner	7	Safe
Top 4	Songs They Wish They'd Written	"Volcano"	Damien Rice	8	Safe
Top 3	Judges' Choice	"Beggin'"	The Four Seasons	3	Safe
Top 3	Contestant's Choice	"Disease"	Matchbox Twenty	6	Safe
Top 3	Jimmy Iovine's Choice	"We've Got Tonight"	Bob Seger	9	Safe
Finale	Simon Fuller's Choice	"Stand by Me"	Ben E. King	2	Winner
Finale	Favorite Performance	"Movin' Out (Anthony's Song)"	Billy Joel	4	Winner
Finale	Winner's Single	"Home"	Phillip Phillips	6	Winner
^Note 1 Due to the judges using their one save on Jessica Sanchez, the Top 7 remained intact for another week.

== Career ==
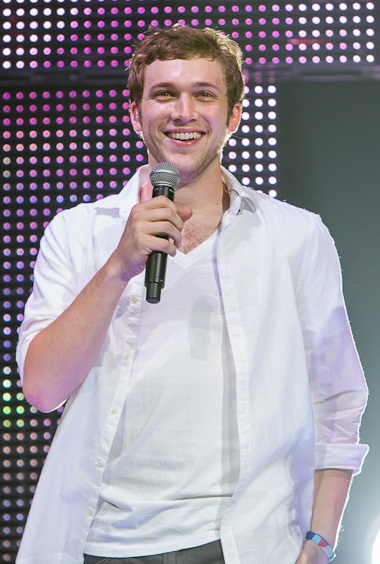
Phillips at the American Idols Live! Tour in Seattle, July 2012

After winning American Idol, Phillips went on the American Idols Live! Tour 2012 from July to September with the rest of the top ten finalists. He performed the National Anthem at the opening game of the 2012 World Series on October 24, 2012. On November 15, he joined forces with the PS22 chorus of Staten Island for a concert to raise money for those affected by Hurricane Sandy. He also performed at the National Christmas Tree Lighting Ceremony on December 6, 2012.

Phillips' coronation song, "Home", was a great success with sales of over 5 million copies in the US. It has been used in NBC's coverage of the Olympics, L.A. Marathon, various commercials, film trailers, and TV shows. He performed "Home" on the PBS Independence Day celebration TV special, A Capitol Fourth. He appeared at the 83rd MLB All-Star Game held at Kansas City on July 10 and sang his coronation song. On October 9, 2012, he joined other musicians in the One World concert held in Syracuse University to honor the Dalai Lama. He also performed "Home" on the CNN Heroes special aired on December 2, 2012, and the CBS's A Home for the Holidays on December 19, 2012.

Phillip has performed on The Today Show and Good Morning America Concert Series, Late Show with David Letterman, Jimmy Kimmel Live!, The Tonight Show With Jay Leno, The Ellen DeGeneres Show, Live With Kelly, The View, and Conan. He has also appeared at the American Music Awards and Billboard Music Awards.

Phillips made the Forbes Highest Earning American Idol list for each of the three years he was qualified. For the list published in January 2014 and January 2015, he ranked number three. For the list published January 2016, he ranked number four.

=== 2012–2013: The World from the Side of the Moon ===
Phillips released his debut album, The World from the Side of the Moon, on November 19, 2012. The album was produced by Gregg Wattenberg, with Phillips writing or co-writing the majority of the disc. On November 6, 2012, "Where We Came From" was released for sale in advance of the album, and was a free download on pre-orders. The album debuted at No. 4 in the Billboard 200 with sales of 169,000 copies, and was certified Platinum by RIAA in August 2013. The World from the Side of the Moon was on the Billboard Top 200 album chart for 61 weeks. That puts in number two of all the debut albums by American Idol winners.

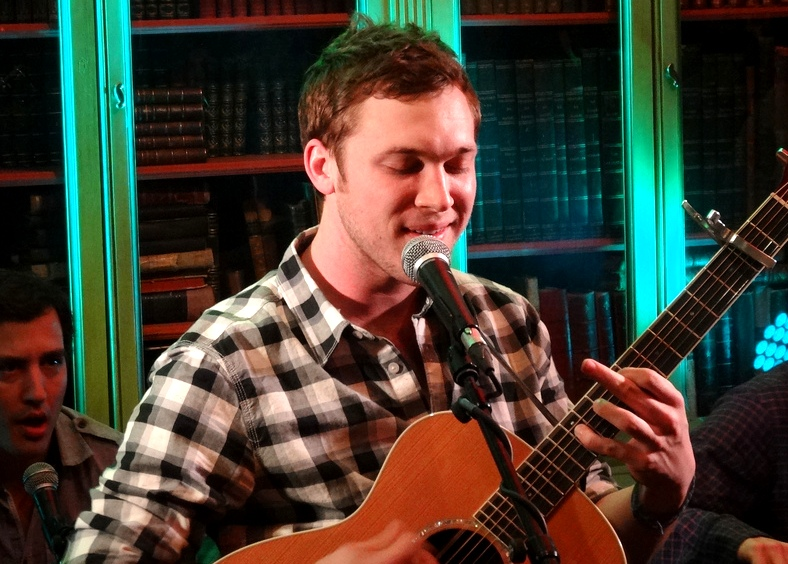
Phillips in Paris, March 2013

In January 2013, Phillips appeared on the cover of Billboard magazine with Interscope Records founder and CEO and American Idol mentor, Jimmy Iovine. "Phillip is a true artist and the fact that people are embracing his album shows they accept him as an artist." said Iovine.

On January 29, 2013, Phillips began a tour in North America as the opening act for Matchbox Twenty. He also headlined ten college dates in January with a four-piece acoustic band, and a further college tour with an electric band from March through May after his tour with Matchbox Twenty. Nine of his college tour dates were postponed due to a continuing health issue.

From July 6 to October 5, 2013, he toured as the opening act for John Mayer's Born and Raised World Tour, followed by his own college tour and then further dates with John Mayer until December 17. He also performed at the international music festival Rock in Rio, in Rio de Janeiro on September 21, the same day as John Mayer and Bruce Springsteen. In 2014, a solo tour of Canada was also scheduled, as well as other dates in the US.

The third single released from the album was "Where We Came From".

"Gone, Gone, Gone" from the album was released as a single on February 11, 2013. Phillips performed the song live on the March 14, 2013 edition of American Idol. "Gone, Gone, Gone" was also used as the twelfth season's "send-off" song, played as the backing track for the montages that highlight each week's eliminated finalist. The song was also used in the film, The Amazing Spider-Man 2.

Phillips capped off 2013 with a nomination from the American Music Awards for Best New Artist. He joined Kelly Clarkson and Carrie Underwood as the only American Idol winners to receive this nomination.

=== 2014–2016: Behind the Light ===
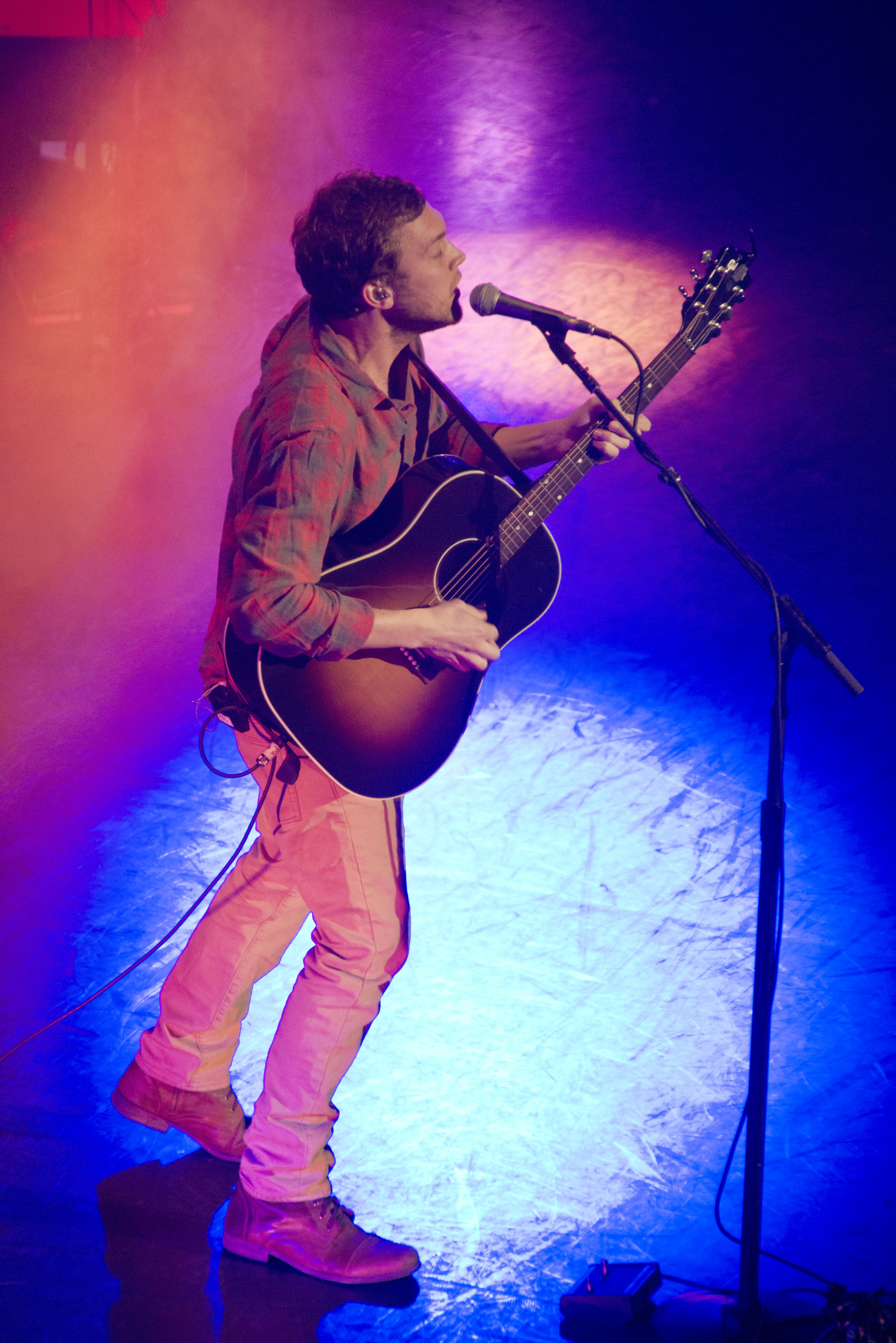
Phillips performing in 2014

In March 2013, Phillips stated that he was "always writing" and that his second studio album would be released sometime in 2014. The album, Behind the Light, was released on May 19, 2014. The debut single, "Raging Fire", from his second album was released digitally on March 3, 2014. The song was featured in the National Hockey League's Playoffs. Phillips received his first BMI pop music song writing award for "Raging Fire". A promotional single, "Fly", was released alongside the album's pre-order on April 22, 2014. On March 6, 2014, Phillips returned to the thirteenth season of American Idol to perform his single "Raging Fire", then he also performed it again with contestant Sam Woolf as a duet for the series finale on May 21, 2014.

Phillips toured with O.A.R. in the summer of 2014. In 2014, he also launched the Behind the Light Fall Tour in the United States to support his second album.

The second single released from the album was "Unpack Your Heart". The song was featured in a TV commercial for Ram 1500 trucks, which premiered at the 2014 American Music Awards.

In January 2015, Phillips filed a lawsuit against his label 19 Recordings, seeking to be released from his contract". The dispute was settled in June 2017.

On April 7, 2016, Phillips returned to the American Idol stage for the series finale of the fifteenth season and performed a opening alumni ensemble for One Voice with Barry Manilow and also a tribute to David Bowie with four other winners; David Cook, Kris Allen, Lee Dewyze, and Nick Fradiani. Former Idol judge Simon Cowell said Phillip Phillips was the only contestant he liked after he left the show. Jennifer Lopez, who was a judge on the eleventh season, revealed that Phillips is her favorite American Idol winner.

He performed at the 2016 Invictus Games closing ceremony in Orlando, Florida on May 12, 2016.

On June 17, 2016, Phillips started a co-headlining tour with Matt Nathanson at the San Diego County Fair and ending on August 13 at the Wisconsin State Fair.

=== 2017–2019: Collateral and acting ===
During summer 2017, Phillips was the opening act on the Live Nation Goo Goo Dolls' Long Way Home tour.

On October 18, 2017, Phillips performed at the CMT Artists of the Year awards, where he did a cover of Sam Hunt's "Body Like a Back Road", which won Song of the Year.

Phillips released the single "Miles" to radio on August 11, 2017, through 19R/Interscope. It was the lead single to the new album.

In January 2018, Phillips appeared in an episode of Hawaii Five-0, playing a diamond smuggler.

Phillips' third studio album, Collateral was released January 19, 2018. Producer Ryan Hadlock has been Phillips' primary collaborator, and he also worked with Nathan Chapman, Jon Nite, John Paul White and Todd Clark, with whom he wrote the singles "Gone, Gone, Gone" and "Raging Fire". He performed "The Magnetic Tour" from February 9, 2018 to April 14, 2018 with over 40 shows to support the album.

In the summer of 2018, Phillips hit the road headlining his solo tour and a co-headlining tour with Gavin DeGraw including over 30 shows.

In September 2019, Phillips teamed with American Authors and Maddie Poppe on a new version of the song "Bring It on Home".

=== 2020–2022: Pandemic support ===
On May 3, 2020, Phillips returned to American Idol season 18 and opened the Top 11 by performing "Home". The episode "On with the Show: Homeward Bound" featured the theme of songs about home. The show was broadcast from homes of the participants due to the pandemic health crisis.

Phillips performed on the Idol alumni ensemble (including Alejandro Aranda, Fantasia, Gabby Barrett, Jordin Sparks, Katharine McPhee, Kellie Pickler, Laine Hardy, Lauren Alaina, Ruben Studdard and Scotty McCreery) for "We Are the World" with Lionel Richie on the season finale on May 17, 2020.

Phillips performed at pandemic relief efforts for Sendero Together for Texas and for the Phoebe Hospital Foundation to help support frontline medical heroes battling COVID-19 in southwest Georgia.

On July 17, 2021, Phillips performed "Home" in support of the Project Angel Food telethon. The telethon help raise $1M to sustain the expanded service to those in need, preparing and delivering over one million medically tailored meals.

On April 17, 2022, Phillips returned to the twentieth anniversary of American Idol to perform his single "Love Like That". It was also his tenth year anniversary since winning the show.

In the fall of 2022, Phillips hit the road headlining his Where We Came From Tour with guest American Authors.

=== 2023–2025: Drift Back and other works ===
Phillips' fourth studio album, Drift Back was released on June 9, 2023. It includes the single "Dancing with Your Shadows". This was his first release as an indie artist and the single charted at number 12 on Hot Adult Contemporary (HAC) radio airplay without the benefit of a record label. His second single from the album, "Love Like That" charted at number 12.

He was invited back to the twenty-first season of American Idol to be a mentor for the contestants during Hollywood week. He and Catie Turner headed the songwriting group, which consisted of original songs written and performed by the contestants.

Phillips performed "Gone, Gone, Gone" at the 2023 National Memorial Day Concert in honor of Gold Star families, which aired on May 28, 2023, on PBS.

On June 8, 2023, Phillips sang the National Anthem at the third game of the 2023 Stanley Cup Final.

He made his Grand Ole Opry debut on June 14, 2023.

On November 10, 2023 Phillip Phillips performed at the 2023 Biofreeze USA Pickleball National Championship in Dallas. Phillips is an avid fan of the sport who has competed in tournaments.

In the fall of 2023, he headlined the Drift Back Tour in 23 cities to support his new album.

=== 2026–present: The Masked Singer, Let's Go Far ===
In 2026, Phillips competed in season fourteen of The Masked Singer as "Pugcasso" who resembled a pug colored like the arts of Pablo Picasso. He became the runner-up and did an encore of "Home".

In the Fall of 2026, Phillip Phillips will embark on the 30 city Let's Go Far tour to support his new EP.

== Personal life ==
Phillips has suffered from a congenital kidney condition. Soon after American Idol finished, he had large kidney stones removed and underwent reconstructive surgery on his kidney.

On December 26, 2014, Phillips announced his engagement to girlfriend Hannah Blackwell. The two were married at the Resora Plantation in Albany, Georgia, on October 24, 2015.

Phillips and Blackwell's son was born on November 10, 2019. They welcomed a daughter on June 19, 2025.

Phillips has supported organizations including the Sarah Foundation and the Gibson Flood Relief Campaign. as well being an ambassador for Brave Beginnings. He has also supported DoSomething, National Park Foundation, NCIRE – the Veterans Health Research Institute, Save the Music Foundation, and Habitat for Humanity.

== Discography ==
- The World from the Side of the Moon (2012)
- Behind the Light (2014)
- Collateral (2018)
- Drift Back (2023)

== Filmography ==
Film and television roles
Year	Title	Role	Notes
2016	Pure Genius	Himself	
2018	Hawaii Five-0	Neil Voss	Episode: "Na Keiki a Kalaihaohia" ("The Children of Kalaihaohia")
2026	The Masked Singer	Pugcasso	Runner Up

== Tours ==
Headlining

- College Tour (2013)
- Canada Tour Spring (2014)
- Behind the Light Fall Tour (2014)
- The Magnetic Tour (2018)
- An Evening with Phillip Phillips (Winter Acoustic Tour 2020)
- Where We Came From Fall Tour (2022)
- Drift Back Fall Tour (2023)
- Let's Go Far Fall Tour (2026)

Co-headlining

- American Idols Live! Tour 2012 (2012)
- Summer Tour (2014) (with O.A.R.)
- With Matt Nathanson (2016)
- With Gavin DeGraw (Summer 2018)

Supporting

- North Tour (2013) with Matchbox Twenty
- Born and Raised World Tour (2013) with John Mayer
- Long Way Home Tour (2017) with Goo Goo Dolls

== Awards and nominations ==
Year	Association	Category	Work	Result
2012	Teen Choice Awards	Choice Love Song	"Home"	Nominated
2012	Teen Choice Awards	Choice Music: Breakout Artist	Himself	Nominated
2013	World Music Awards	World's Best Song	"Home"	Nominated
2013	World Music Awards	World's Best Male Artist	Himself	Nominated
2013	Billboard Music Awards	Top Rock Song	"Home"	Nominated
2013	Billboard Music Awards	Top Rock Album	The World from the Side of the Moon	Nominated
2013	MuchMusic Video Awards	International Video of the Year - Artist	"Home"	Nominated
2013	Teen Choice Awards	Choice Male Artist	Himself	Nominated
2013	Teen Choice Awards	Choice Rock Song	"Gone, Gone, Gone"	Nominated
2013	American Music Awards	New Artist of the Year	Himself	Nominated
2014	BMI Pop Music Awards	Award-Winning Songs – "Raging Fire"	Songwriter	Won

== See also ==
- List of Idols winners
