= Jessica Sanchez discography =

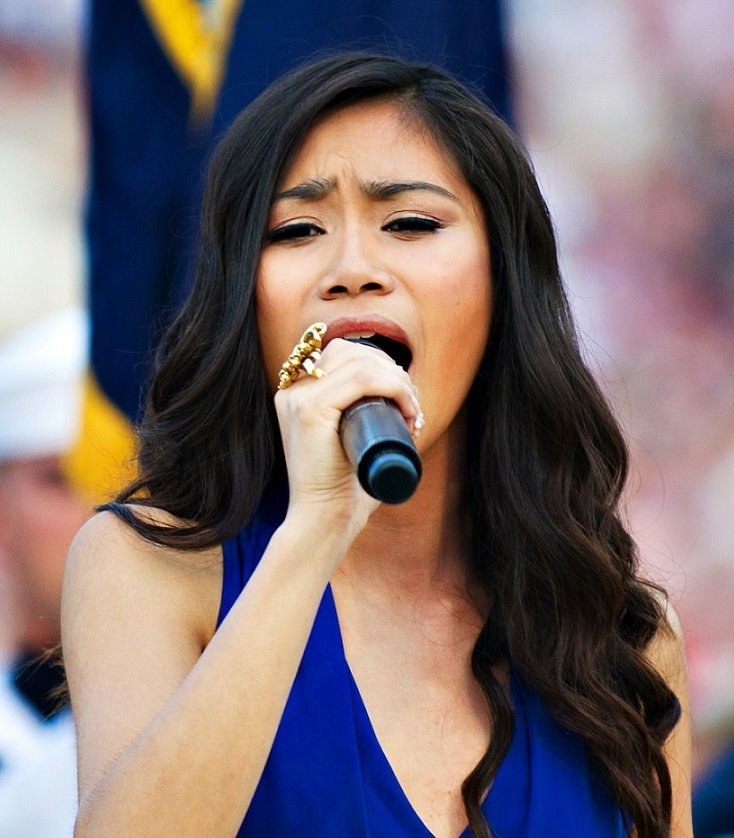
- Sanchez in 2012
- Studio albums: 1
- Extended plays: 3
- Compilation albums: 1
- Singles: 13
- B-sides: 16
- Music videos: 11

This is the discography of American R&B/pop singer-songwriter and actress Jessica Sanchez. She was the runner-up on the eleventh season of American Idol.

Two compilations of her performances from American Idol were released. The digital album, Jessica Sanchez: Journey to the Finale, was released on iTunes after the finale, and American Idol Season 11 Highlights was released in July 2012. Her post-Idol debut studio album, Me, You and the Music was released in the United States on April 30, 2013. Her debut single "Tonight" features American R&B singer Ne-Yo, while the song's accompanying music video was shot in downtown Los Angeles on March 1, 2013, with director Justin Francis. The single released on March 22, 2013.

== Albums ==
=== Studio albums ===
Title	Details	Peak chart positions		Sales
Title	Details	US	US Dig.	Sales
Me, You and the Music	Released: April 30, 2013; Label: Interscope/19; Formats: CD, LP, digital download	26	16	US: 17,000

=== Compilation albums ===
Title	Details	Peak chart positions			Sales
Title	Details	US	US Heat.	US Indie	Sales
Jessica Sanchez: Journey to the Finale	Release date: May 24, 2012; Label: 19; Formats: Digital download	126	1	21	US: 6,000

== Extended plays ==
Title	Details	Peak chart positions	Sales
Title	Details	US	Sales
American Idol Season 11 Highlights	Release date: July 3, 2012; Label: 19; Formats: Walmart exclusive EP	77	US: 15,000
Christmas with Jessica	Release date: December 8, 2015; Label: Independent; Formats: Digital download	—	Undisclosed
A Classic Christmas	Release date: November 29, 2024; Label: Independent; Formats: Digital download	—	Undisclosed

== Singles ==
=== As lead artist ===
Title	Year	Peak chart positions			Album
Title	Year	US Pop	US Dance	AUS	Album
"Don't Stop the Music"	2009	—	—	—	Non-album single
"Change Nothing"	2012	—	—	—	Non-album single
"Jump In" (with Apl.de.ap)	2012	—	—	—	Non-album single
"Tonight" (featuring Ne-Yo)	2013	48	—	42	Me, You & the Music
"Lead Me Home"	2013	—	—	—	Heartbeat of Home
"This Love"	2014	—	—	—	Non-album single
"Two Forevers" (with Christian Bautista)	2015	—	—	—	Kapit
"Call Me"	2016	—	—	—	Non-album single
"Stronger Together"	2016	—	4	—	Non-album single
"Caught Up" (with Ricky Breaker)	2018	—	—	—	Non-album single
"Millionaire"	2018	—	—	—	Non-album single
"Another Silent Christmas" (with Christian Bautista)	2018	—	—	—	Non-album single
"Love You" (credited as JES)	2019	—	—	—	Non-album single
"A Whole New World" (with Leroy Sanchez)	2019	—	—	—	Non-album single
"Angels" (credited as JES)	2019	—	—	—	Non-album single
"Us"	2021	—	—	—	Non-album single
"Baddie"	2022	—	—	—	Non-album single
"—" denotes releases that did not chart or were not released in that territory.

=== As featured artist ===
Title	Year	Album
"Just You and Me" (Brandon Kane featuring Jessica Sanchez)	2010	Non-album single
"First Kiss" (Ne-Hy featuring Jessica Sanchez)	2012	Non-album single
"Vacation" (DJ Komori featuring Jessica Sanchez)	2014	Non-album single
"My Heart Goes" (Ricardo Padua featuring Jessica Sanchez)	2015	Non-album single

=== Promotional recordings ===
Title	Year	Album
"I Will Always Love You"	2012	Jessica Sanchez: Journey to the Finale
"Turn the Beat Around"	2012	Jessica Sanchez: Journey to the Finale
"Everybody Has a Dream"	2012	Jessica Sanchez: Journey to the Finale
"Sweet Dreams"	2012	Jessica Sanchez: Journey to the Finale
"How Will I Know"	2012	Jessica Sanchez: Journey to the Finale
"Stuttering"	2012	Jessica Sanchez: Journey to the Finale
"Fallin'"	2012	Jessica Sanchez: Journey to the Finale
"Try a Little Tenderness"	2012	Non-album single
"Bohemian Rhapsody"	2012	Non-album single
"Dance with My Father"	2012	Jessica Sanchez: Journey to the Finale
"Proud Mary"	2012	Jessica Sanchez: Journey to the Finale
"You Are So Beautiful"	2012	Non-album single
"Steal Away"	2012	Non-album single
"Eternal Flame" (with Hollie Cavanagh)	2012	Non-album single
"And I Am Telling You I'm Not Going"	2012	Jessica Sanchez: Journey to the Finale
"My All"	2012	Non-album single
"I Don't Want to Miss a Thing"	2012	Jessica Sanchez: Journey to the Finale
"I'll Be There"	2012	Non-album single
"I Have Nothing"	2012	Non-album single
"The Prayer"	2012	Non-album single
"—" denotes releases that did not chart or were not released in that territory.

=== Guest appearances ===
Title	Year	Other artist(s)	Album
"We Are the World 25 for Haiti (YouTube edition)"	2010	57 YouTube musicians	Non-album single
"Clarity"	2013	Glee cast	Glee: The Music, The Complete Season Four
"Wings"	2013	Glee cast	Glee: The Music, The Complete Season Four
"Hourglass"	2013	Zedd	iTunes Session
"The Night I Danced with You"	2014	Jencarlos Canela	Home of Heartbeat
"Beauty and the Beast"	2017	Matt Bloyd	Covers, Vol. 2
"Can You Feel the Love Tonight"	2019	Matt Bloyd	King

== Music videos ==
Title	Year	Other artist(s)	Director(s)
"Jump In"	2012	Apl.de.ap	Marc Andre Debruyne
"Tonight"	2013	Ne-Yo	Justin Francis
"Lead Me Home"	2013	None	Unknown
"Vacation"	2014	None	Unknown
"This Love"	2015	None	Gabriel Valenciano
"Two Forevers"	2015	Christian Bautista	Unknown
"The Feeling"	2016	Leroy Sanchez	Ryan Parma
"Stronger Together" (Tracy Young remix)	2016	None	Gus Black
"Beauty and the Beast"	2017	Matt Bloyd	Baxter Stapleton
"Caught Up"	2018	Ricky Breaker	Leandro Crease
"Another Silent Christmas Song"	2018	Christian Bautista	Unknown
"A Whole New World"	2019	Leroy Sanchez	Ryan Parma
"Us"	2021	None	Chris Ruel; Chris Soriano
"Baddie"	2022	None	Alfredo Flores
