= The Final 1 season 2 =

The Final 1
- Season 2
- Hosted by: Shaun Jansen; Nadiah M. Din
- Judges: Taufik Batisah; Ken Lim; Jaclyn Victor; Kit Chan (guest); Corrinne May (guest)
- Winner: Jermaine Leong
- Runner-up: Charlene Su
- Finals venue: Capitol Theatre

Release
- Original network: MediaCorp Channel 5
- Original release: 5 July – 4 October 2015

Season chronology
- ← Previous; Season 1

The second season of The Final 1 premiered on MediaCorp Channel 5 on 5 July 2015. It is a Singaporean reality-singing competition programme created by the director of Hype Records Ken Lim. It was won by Jermaine Leong.

Taufik Batisah and Lim returned for their second season as judges, and were joined by new judge Jaclyn Victor who replaced Kit Chan. Chan later returned to the show as a guest judge while Victor was away for her maternity leave. Season one's runner-up Shaun Jansen joined the show as the host.

Similar to the previous season, the winner would receive a cash prize and a management contract worth $100,000.

== Show changes ==
On 30 June 2015, it was announced via a promotional video of the show that returning judges Taufik Batisah and Ken Lim would be serving on the judging panel for the second season. Season one judge Kit Chan did not appear in the video, and therefore was ruled out of returning to the show. It was not announced whether the show would bring in a third judge to replace Chan, though the season began with only Batisah and Lim as the judges for the first two episodes. On the third episode, it was announced by Lim that the show would be bringing in a third and final judge for the season, and revealed to be Jaclyn Victor.

Vanessa Vanderstraaten and Mike Kasem did not return to host the second season. They were replaced by Shaun Jansen, who was only officially introduced by Lim and made his first appearance in the seventh episode.

In this season, a few major changes to the format of the show was made. Contrary to the previous season, the public would not be allowed to vote for their favourites and play a part in deciding the contestants to advance in the competition. The judges would instead be the ones making the decision to eliminate contestants from the competition to ensure those "getting through to the next round will be only purely on [their] vocals and talent". The public would only be allowed to cast their votes when the competition is left with the final two contestants to decide on the winner.

Unlike the previous season where the show was mainly taped at the MediaCorp TV Theatre, most of the competition rounds would be recorded at The Ground Theatre at *SCAPE this season. In addition, apart from the final three episodes which would be shown live, all episodes would be pre-recorded and the results shows were discontinued. Results from the previous week would only be revealed during the following week's show.

The upper age limit for the contestants is reduced to 26 in this season (down from 32 the last season), which brings the eligible age-range to 16 to 26 years old.

== Online and regional auditions ==
The show is open to all citizens and permanent residents of Singapore aged 16 to 26 as of 1 January 2015. The online auditions began on 22 February 2015 and ended on 20 March 2015 at noon. To participate in the auditions, all contestants must register themselves at the official website of the show and submit an audition video of no more than three minutes long. Over 1,000 audition clips were submitted for the competition.

Auditionees who have submitted their online video were later invited to attend a face-to-face audition session conducted by the producers. The producers auditions were conducted in all of the five Community Development Council (CDC) districts in Singapore, with the contestants attending the one in the area they reside in. The audition sessions at the Central and South West districts were also opened for walk-in auditionees who did not register themselves for the online auditions.

At the end of the regional auditions, the producers shortlisted a group of potential contestants for the judges, Batisah and Lim, who then selected 12 males and 12 females to advance to the next round of the competition as the final 24.

Episode air date	Audition CDC district	Date	Venue	Number of contestants advanced
5 July 2015	Central	5 April 2015	Buona Vista Community Club	6
5 July 2015	Central	11 April 2015	AMK Hub	6
5 July 2015	North West		Chong Pang Community Club	5
5 July 2015	South West	4 April 2015	Boon Lay Community Club	3
5 July 2015	South East		Changi Simei Community Club	3
5 July 2015	North East		Tampines Changkat Community Club	7
Total number of contestants advanced				24

== Top 24 finalists ==
The following is a list of top 24 finalists who failed to reach the top 16 rounds:

Males

Contestant	Age (on show)	Occupation	Audition CDC district	Audition song
Brendon Chua	22	National serviceman	North West	"Jealous"
Iqbal	23	National serviceman	Central	"All of Me"
James Rainier	23	National serviceman	South West	"Thank You"
Toh Yi Fan	18	Student	South East	Not aired

Females

Contestant	Age (on show)	Occupation	Audition CDC district	Audition song
AJ	16	Student	South West	"Domino"
Vanessa Devi	19	Student	Central	"Love Me Harder"
Cheryl Lim	23	Wedding and events planner	South East	"If I Ain't Got You"
Priscilla Tan	26	Performer	North East	"When I Was Your Man"

== Top 24 rounds ==
The top 24 finalists were separated by gender, and performed in groups of four for the first round. The groups and song choices were all chosen by the producers. The second round involved solo performances, with the judges selecting contestants they were uncertain of moving on to the next round to perform again. After this round, the judges eliminated two contestants from each of the gender groups.

The judges later announced they have to eliminate more contestants from the remaining 20, and called out the bottom 3 contestants of each gender group. The contestants who were not called out were declared safe, and each of them had to pick one contestant from the opposite gender group to advance with them to the final 16. Two contestants (one from each gender group) were saved from elimination via majority votes by their fellow contestants, and the rest were eliminated.

Category	Group	Song	Solo round			Result
Category	Group	Song	Order	Contestant	Song	Result
Boys	1	"Teenage Dream"	1	Leon Neoh	"Jealous"	Advanced
Boys	1	"Teenage Dream"	4	Gareth Fernandez	"I Can't Make You Love Me"	Advanced
Boys	1	"Teenage Dream"	7	Sam Driscoll	"Blank Space"	Saved (by contestants)^{1}
Boys	1	"Teenage Dream"	N/A	Lee Wei Lun	N/A (not selected to perform)	Advanced
Boys	2	"Walking on Sunshine"	2	Brendon Chua	"Jealous"	Eliminated (by contestants)^{1}
Boys	2	"Walking on Sunshine"	5	James Rainier	"I Can't Make You Love Me"	Eliminated (by contestants)^{1}
Boys	2	"Walking on Sunshine"	6	Isaac Ong	"I Can't Make You Love Me"	Advanced
Boys	2	"Walking on Sunshine"	N/A	Bernard Dinata	N/A (not selected to perform)	Advanced
Boys	3	"Bang Bang"	3	Marcus Ng	"Jealous"	Advanced
Boys	3	"Bang Bang"	8	Azhar Aziz	"I'll Be There"	Advanced
Boys	3	"Bang Bang"	9	Iqbal	"I'll Be There"	Eliminated (by judges)
Boys	3	"Bang Bang"	N/A	Toh Yi Fan^{3}	N/A (not aired)^{3}	Eliminated (by judges)
Girls	1	"Steal My Girl"	1	Jermaine Leong	"Blank Space"	Advanced
Girls	1	"Steal My Girl"	6	Vanessa Devi	"I'll Be There"	Eliminated (by judges)
Girls	1	"Steal My Girl"	N/A	Shanice Hedger	N/A (not selected to perform)	Advanced
Girls	1	"Steal My Girl"	N/A	Ruth Mathews	N/A (not selected to perform)	Advanced
Girls	2	"Uptown Funk"	2	Farhanah Khan	"Blank Space"	Saved (by contestants)^{2}
Girls	2	"Uptown Funk"	7	Eunice Png	"I Can't Make You Love Me"	Advanced
Girls	2	"Uptown Funk"	8	Odelle Sabrin	"I Can't Make You Love Me"	Advanced
Girls	2	"Uptown Funk"	N/A	Cheryl Lim	N/A (not selected to perform)	Eliminated (by contestants)^{2}
Girls	3	"Use Somebody"	3	AJ	"Blank Space"	Eliminated (by judges)
Girls	3	"Use Somebody"	4	Charlene Su	"I Can't Make You Love Me"	Advanced
Girls	3	"Use Somebody"	5	Priscilla Tan	"Blank Space"	Eliminated (by contestants)^{2}
Girls	3	"Use Somebody"	N/A	Lou Peixin	N/A (not selected to perform)	Advanced

1. The first five majority votes cast by Jermaine Leong, Ruth Mathews, Shanice Hedger, Odelle Sabrin and Eunice Png were all directed to Sam Driscoll. Lou Peixin and Charlene Su did not need to vote as there was already a majority.
2. Priscilla Tan received two minority votes from Leon Neoh and Marcus Ng; Cheryl Lim received two minority votes from Bernard Dinata and Isaac Ong; and Farhanah Khan received three majority votes from Gareth Fernandez, Lee Wei Lun and Azhar Aziz.
3. Toh Yi Fan, better known as Tzire, was credited on the show as "Y.Fan". The identity of "Y.Fan" was unknown at first, as he was not featured in the first episode and only appeared very briefly in wide shots during the group performance round. However, Toh confirmed his participation in the top 24 rounds, with an uploaded picture of himself with his fellow group members on Instagram.

== Top 16 finalists ==
The following is a list of top 16 finalists who failed to reach the finals:

Males

Contestant	Age (on show)	Occupation	Audition CDC district	Audition song
Sam Driscoll	21	National serviceman	North East	"Shake It Off"
Leon Neoh	23	Student	South East	"Valerie"
Marcus Ng	18	Student	North West	"You'll Be in My Heart"

Females

Contestant	Age (on show)	Occupation	Audition CDC district	Audition song
Farhanah Khan	23	Student	South West	"I Will Survive"
Ruth Mathews	17	Student	North West	"Lay Me Down"
Eunice Png	26	Singer-songwriter	North West	"Price Tag"

== Top 16 rounds ==
The top 16 finalists were once again divided into two gender-separated groups, with the male group airing on 19 July 2015 and the female group airing on 26 July 2015. The top four males and top four females, along with the two wild card choices by the judges, advanced to the finals as the final 10.

Besides their performance, the top 16 contestants were also evaluated on their relatability to the audience. After the first six contestants of each gender group has performed, the two contestants with the highest score from the judges were sent straight through to the final 10. The competition then continued with last two contestants performing their songs, and the judges advanced two more contestants with the highest score to the finals.

Midway through the episode on 19 July 2015, Ken Lim introduced Malaysian singer and Malaysian Idol winner Jaclyn Victor as the third judge of the season.

=== Males – Relatability ===
Order	Contestant	Song	Result
1	Bernard Dinata	"The Man Who Can't Be Moved"	Advanced
2	Gareth Fernandez	"Ordinary People"	Advanced
3	Isaac Ong	"Rude"	Wild Card
4	Marcus Ng	"I Want You"	Wild Card
5	Leon Neoh	"Mama Do (Uh Oh, Uh Oh)"	Wild Card
6	Sam Driscoll	"The A Team"	Wild Card
7	Azhar Aziz	"Stay"	Advanced
8	Lee Wei Lun	"Yellow"	Advanced

=== Females – Relatability ===
Order	Contestant	Song	Result
1	Lou Peixin	"Try"	Advanced
2	Shanice Hedger	"My Immortal"	Wild Card
3	Ruth Mathews	"Domino"	Wild Card
4	Eunice Png	"Poker Face"	Wild Card
5	Farhanah Khan	"Hold On, We're Going Home"	Wild Card
6	Charlene Su	"You Ruin Me"	Advanced
7	Odelle Sabrin	"Gravity"	Advanced
8	Jermaine Leong	"Lay Me Down"	Advanced

=== Wild Card round – Marketability ===
Following those eight contestants advancing on 19 and 26 July 2015, the remaining eight top 16 finalists competed in the Wild Card round for the final two spots in the top 10. The contestants were put to the test of their marketability as an artiste in the entertainment industry. To showcase their ability to sing in at least two languages, all contestants performed an ethnic song of their choice. Following another performance by each Wild Card contender, the judges selected two contestants, regardless of gender, to advance to the final group of 10. The episode was aired on 2 August 2015.

Order	Contestant	Song	Result
1	Shanice Hedger	"Beribu Sesalan"	Advanced
2	Leon Neoh	"爱我别走"	Eliminated
3	Ruth Mathews	"至少还有你"	Eliminated
4	Marcus Ng	"专属天使"	Eliminated
5	Farhanah Khan	"Kamu Yang Kutunggu"	Eliminated
6	Sam Driscoll	"第一个清晨"	Eliminated
7	Eunice Png	"如果没有你"	Eliminated
8	Isaac Ong	"我愿意"	Advanced

== Finalists ==
The following is a list of top 10 finalists:

Contestant	Age (on show)	Occupation	Audition CDC district	Audition song
Jermaine Leong	16	Student	North East	"It Will Rain"
Charlene Su	20	Student	North East	"Slow Motion"
Odelle Sabrin	22	Student	North West	"Titanium"
Isaac Ong	26	Student / Social entrepreneur	North East	"Lean on Me"
Azhar Aziz	20	National serviceman	North East	"Ordinary People"

Contestant	Age (on show)	Occupation	Audition CDC district	Audition song
Lee Wei Lun	23	Student	North East	"P.D.A. (We Just Don't Care)"
Shanice Hedger	19	Student	Central	"Bang Bang"
Bernard Dinata	19	National serviceman	Central	"Just the Way You Are"
Lou Peixin	22	Student	Central	"Love Never Felt So Good"
Gareth Fernandez	25	Student / Performer	Central	"Stay with Me"

== Finals ==
The finals began its airing on 9 August. In this season, there are eight weeks of the finals (the top 10 and top 9 weeks were shown together in a single episode) and 10 finalists, with one finalist eliminated per week based on the judges' scores (with the exception of the top 8 week, where the judges eliminated two contestants). The results shows were discontinued, and results from the previous week would only be revealed during the following week's show. Therefore, all the contestants from the previous week would turn up for the performance show on the following week, but only the ones that are safe from elimination would get to perform.

Each of the episodes would come with a theme, which are all in relation to the contestants' development as an artiste. Hence, apart from their usual performances, the contestants were also assessed on the exercises that they were tasked to complete each week, all based on the respective weekly themes.

Shaun Jansen was officially introduced as the host of the season at the start of the top 8 performance show.

=== Top 10 – Identity ===
- Group performance: "A Sky Full of Stars"

This week, the contestants were tasked to build on their unique identity as a performer through makeup, hair and clothing style makeovers.

Order	Contestant	Song	Result
1	Gareth Fernandez	"Valerie"	Eliminated
2	Lou Peixin	"Titanium"	Safe
3	Bernard Dinata	"Not Over You"	Safe
4	Charlene Su	"She Will Be Loved"	Safe
5	Azhar Aziz	"Hold Back the River"	Safe
6	Odelle Sabrin	"When Love Takes Over"	Safe
7	Lee Wei Lun	"You Give Me Something"	Safe Last
8	Jermaine Leong	"Almost Is Never Enough"	Safe
9	Isaac Ong	"Just the Way You Are"	Safe
10	Shanice Hedger	"Royals"	Safe

=== Top 9 – Pop Culture ===
This week, the contestants collaborated with students from Republic Polytechnic to create online viral videos exploring the pop culture.

Order	Contestant	Song	Result
1	Azhar Aziz	"Mirrors"	4th
2	Shanice Hedger	"Love Me Harder"	3rd
3	Odelle Sabrin	"Rumour Has It"	2nd
4	Bernard Dinata	"Latch"	5th
5	Jermaine Leong	"Love on Top"	8th
6	Isaac Ong	"Heartbeat Song"	1st
7	Charlene Su	"Diamonds"	7th
8	Lou Peixin	"Dark Horse"	Eliminated
9	Lee Wei Lun	"Wrecking Ball"	6th

=== Top 8 – Foundation ===
Each contestant paid tribute to their families and friends for their support, and performed a song as a dedication to them.

Order	Contestant	Song	Result
1	Isaac Ong	"What Are Words"	4th
2	Odelle Sabrin	"Mama's Song"	Bottom 3
3	Shanice Hedger	"Flashlight"	Bottom 3
4	Azhar Aziz	"You Make It Real"	2nd
5	Bernard Dinata	"Home"	Bottom 3
6	Lee Wei Lun	"She Is Love"	3rd
7	Charlene Su	"Dance with My Father"	1st
8	Jermaine Leong	"You Are for Me"	5th
Final showdown details
1	Odelle Sabrin	"The First Time Ever I Saw Your Face"	Safe
2	Bernard Dinata	"What's Going On"	Eliminated
3	Shanice Hedger	"Purple Rain"	Eliminated

Owing to the judges unable to decide on the contestants to eliminate from the competition, the bottom 3 contestants were allowed to perform on the following week. Based on the final showdown performances, the judges voted to send one of the bottom 3 to the next round of the competition.

Judges' votes to save

- Batisah: Shanice Hedger – felt Hedger delivered the performance with "so much fire and conviction"
- Victor: Odelle Sabrin – gave no reason, but stated it was without a doubt that she had to save Sabrin
- Lim: Odelle Sabrin – stated his decision was based on who performed better in the final showdown

=== Top 6 – Sustainability ===
- Guest mentors: Alison Leong & Georgina Chang

This week, the contestants were evaluated by the guest mentors on their sustainability in the entertainment industry via a questions-and-answers session. The judges have also chosen songs based on the theme "Classics" for the contestants to perform.

Order	Contestant	Song	Result
1	Charlene Su	"The Colour of My Love"	2nd
2	Azhar Aziz	"Addicted to Love"	Bottom 2
3	Lee Wei Lun	"High and Dry"	Bottom 2
4	Isaac Ong	"Don't Let the Sun Go Down on Me"	1st
5	Jermaine Leong	"Let's Stay Together"	3rd
6	Odelle Sabrin	"The First Time Ever I Saw Your Face"	4th
Final showdown details
1	Azhar Aziz	"Tears in Heaven"	Safe
2	Lee Wei Lun	"Every Breath You Take"	Eliminated

Owing to a tie in the judges' scores, the bottom 2 contestants were allowed to perform on the following week. Based on the final showdown performances, the judges voted to send one of the bottom 2 to the next round of the competition.

Judges' votes to save

- Lim: Lee Wei Lun – felt Lee did a better job in giving a "creative performance"
- Batisah: Azhar Aziz – went with the performance he felt more connected with
- Chan: Azhar Aziz – went with the performance that moved her

=== Top 5 (first week) – Sustainability ===
- Guest mentor: Zul Sutan

This week, besides evaluating the contestants' sustainability in the entertainment industry, guest mentor Zul Sutan provided guidance to the contestants on their performances during the rehearsals. Once again, the contestants performed songs based on the theme "Classics". Victor did not appear on the judging panel in this episode as she was away for her maternity leave, and was replaced by former judge Kit Chan who returned to the show as a guest judge.

Order	Contestant	Song
1	Isaac Ong	"Play That Funky Music" / "Give Up the Funk (Tear the Roof off the Sucker)"
2	Charlene Su	"Sir Duke"
3	Jermaine Leong	"Superstar"
4	Odelle Sabrin	"Don't You Worry 'bout a Thing"
5	Azhar Aziz	"Tears in Heaven"

=== Top 5 (second week) – Media ===
This week, the contestants were assessed on their interaction with the media via interviews with the practitioners. There were no eliminations based on the previous week's performances, as all top 5 contestants were allowed to sing their first song. The contestants were then ranked based on their performance of the first song, and the one with the lowest ranking was eliminated. The top 4 contestants also sang their second song after the announcement of the results as their victory song.

Order	Contestant	Song	Result
1	Jermaine Leong	"I Will Never Let You Down"	1st
2	Isaac Ong	"Skinny Love"	2nd
3	Odelle Sabrin	"I Could Fall in Love"	3rd
4	Azhar Aziz	"Demons"	Eliminated
5	Charlene Su	"Only Love Can Hurt Like This"	4th
Victory songs
1	Jermaine Leong	"Never Gone"	1st
2	Isaac Ong	"Iris" / "I'll Be"	2nd
3	Odelle Sabrin	"Try"	4th
4	Charlene Su	"Valentine"	3rd

=== Top 4 – Production Numbers ===
- Group performance: "September" / "Shut Up and Dance"

Order	Contestant	Song	Result
1	Jermaine Leong	"Clarity"	1st
2	Isaac Ong	"I Lived"	Eliminated
3	Charlene Su	"One Last Time" / "Where Are Ü Now"	3rd
4	Odelle Sabrin	"Rolling in the Deep"	2nd
Victory songs
1	Jermaine Leong	"Wasting All These Tears"	N/A
2	Odelle Sabrin	"Love Me like You Do"	N/A
3	Charlene Su	"Ghost"	N/A

=== Top 3 – Originality ===
Order	Contestant	Song	Result
1	Jermaine Leong	"I Promise"	1st
2	Charlene Su	"Breathe"	Bottom 2
3	Odelle Sabrin	"Tell Me"	Eliminated
4	Jermaine Leong	"Fly Away"	1st
5	Odelle Sabrin	"Save Me"	Eliminated
6	Charlene Su	"Safe in a Crazy World"	Bottom 2

=== Top 2 – Competitor's Previous Performance / Contestant's Choice / Winner's Single ===
Order	Contestant	Song	Result
1	Charlene Su	"Superstar"	Runner-up
2	Jermaine Leong	"The Colour of My Love"	Winner
3	Charlene Su	"Clown"	Runner-up
4	Jermaine Leong	"Over the Rainbow"	Winner
5	Charlene Su	"Shine"	Runner-up
6	Jermaine Leong	"Shine"	Winner

== Elimination chart ==
Females	Males	Top 24	Top 16	Top 10	Wild Card	Winner

Did Not Perform	Safe	Safe Last	Eliminated

Stage:		Top 24	Top 16		Wild Card	Finals							
Week:		12/7	19/7	26/7	2/8	9/8	16/8	30/8	6/9	13/9	27/9		4/10
Place	Contestant	Result											
1	Jermaine Leong	Top 16		Top 10			8th	5th	3rd	1st	1st	1st	Winner
2	Charlene Su	Top 16		Top 10			7th	1st	2nd	4th	3rd	Bottom 2	Runner-up
3	Odelle Sabrin	Top 16		Top 10			2nd	Bottom 3	4th	3rd	2nd	Elim	
4	Isaac Ong	Top 16	Wild Card		Top 10		1st	4th	1st	2nd	Elim		
5	Azhar Aziz	Top 16	Top 10				4th	2nd	Bottom 2	Elim			
6	Lee Wei Lun	Top 16	Top 10				6th	3rd	Elim				
7	Shanice Hedger	Top 16		Wild Card	Top 10		3rd	Elim^{1}					
8	Bernard Dinata	Top 16	Top 10				5th	Elim^{1}					
9	Lou Peixin	Top 16		Top 10			Elim						
10	Gareth Fernandez	Top 16	Top 10			Elim							
11–16	Farhanah Khan	Top 16		Wild Card	Elim								
11–16	Marcus Ng	Top 16	Wild Card		Elim								
11–16	Sam Driscoll	Top 16	Wild Card		Elim								
11–16	Ruth Mathews	Top 16		Wild Card	Elim								
11–16	Leon Neoh	Top 16	Wild Card		Elim								
11–16	Eunice Png	Top 16		Wild Card	Elim								
17–20	Brendon Chua	Elim (by contestants)											
17–20	James Rainier	Elim (by contestants)											
17–20	Cheryl Lim	Elim (by contestants)											
17–20	Priscilla Tan	Elim (by contestants)											
21–24	AJ	Elim (by judges)											
21–24	Vanessa Devi	Elim (by judges)											
21–24	Iqbal	Elim (by judges)											
21–24	Toh Yi Fan	Elim (by judges)											

^Note 1 Hedger received a vote from Batisah for her final showdown performance, while Dinata received none from any of the judges. Therefore, Hedger finished in seventh place, while Dinata finished in eighth.

== Guest performances ==
Week	Performer(s)	Title	Performance type
Top 5 Week 1	Zul Sutan, Bernard Dinata, Shanice Hedger & Lou Peixin	"Change the World" / "Waiting on the World to Change"	live
Top 2	Jaclyn Victor & The Final 1 Top 9 Girls	"I'm Every Woman"	live
Top 2	Taufik Batisah & The Final 1 Top 9 Boys	"Superstition"	live
Top 2	Azhar Aziz, Bernard Dinata, Lee Wei Lun & Leon Neoh	"Wake Me Up"	live
Top 2	Shanice Hedger, Farhanah Khan, Lou Peixin & Odelle Sabrin	"Black Magic"	live
Top 2	Farisha Ishak, Jermaine Leong & Charlene Su	"Don't Be So Hard on Yourself"	live
Top 2	Jessica Sanchez & Charlene Su	"Dance with My Father"	live
Top 2	Jessica Sanchez & Jermaine Leong	"Clarity"	live
Top 2	Jessica Sanchez	"I Have Nothing" / "And I Am Telling You I'm Not Going"	live
Top 2	Jermaine Leong & Charlene Su	"Stay with Me"	live
Top 2	Jermaine Leong	"Shine"	live
