= Jermaine Leong =

English singer from Singapore

- Also known as: 梁任宇
- Born: Jermaine Leong; 19 December 1998 (age 27); Singapore
- Occupations: Singer, Actor
- Instrument: Vocals
- Years active: 2009–present
- Label: Hype Records

Jermaine Leong (born 19 December 1998; Chinese: 梁任宇; pinyin: Liáng Rènyǔ) is an English singer and actress from Singapore. She was the winner of the second season of The Final 1 in 2015. Thereafter, she has been managed by Hype Records.

== Career ==
Leong started as a child actor in Housewives' Holiday, a 2009 Chinese drama televised on Mediacorp Channel 8.

In 2010, she was cast in okto's Dream School 1 and 2, a television series with song and dance elements.

In 2012, Leong was selected to sing Singapore Youth Festival's 2012 theme song "Live Our Story".

In 2018, Leong took on the lead role in Mediacorp Channel 5's FAM !, co-starring with Gurmit Singh, Vernetta Lopez and Benjamin Kheng.

=== The Final 1 and debut album ===
In 2015, Leong auditioned for the second season of The Final 1, singing Bruno Mars' It Will Rain. After the regional auditions, the producers shortlisted her as a potential contestant and eventually moved on to the next round as one of the 12 girls in the final 24.

At the Top 24 round as part of Group 1, Leong sang Steal My Girl together with Vanessa Devi, Shanice Hedger and Ruth Matthews as the whole group, and Blank Space in the solo round, and was sent through to the next round. She sang Lay Me Down in the Top 16 round and made it through to the finals, singing A Sky Full of Stars as a group of top 10 finalists and Almost Is Never Enough in the solo segment of the Identity round.

Following the eliminations of Lou Peixin and Shanice Hedger, Leong made it to the last semi-final show along with Charlene Su and Odelle Sabrin as the final three contestants and as females. On 4 October, Jermaine duetted with Jessica Sanchez, the runner-up of the eleventh season of the American Idol. During the same night, she sang her winner's single, "Shine", a song written and composed by Ken Lim.

At the end of the final results show, Leong won the competition.

== Personal life ==
Leong was born in Singapore on 19 December 1998. She studied in CHIJ Our Lady of the Nativity, CHIJ Saint Joseph's Convent, and in Temasek Polytechnic, studying for Diploma in Communications & Media Management.

Jermaine has been singing contemporary worship music at the New Creation Church.

== Discography ==
Singles
Year	Title	Album	Notes	Ref
2015	Shine	non album release	Composed by Ken Lim as winning song for The Final 1 (season 2)	
2015	I Promise	non album release	Self-composed and written, debuted at The Final 1 (season 2)	

== Filmography ==
=== Television series ===
Year	Title	Role	Notes	Ref.
2021	Teenage Textbook	Amy		
2018	FAM!	Samantha Tan		
2015	Love is Love: Sunrise	Jessie		
2015	Yolo Pronto			
2014–2015	Fablelicious		Season 1 and 2	
2012	The Private Bengs			
2011–2013	Zero Hero	Sister Sting	Season 1 to 3	
2011	Super Duper Smartimizer			
2011	Stranded 荒岛历险记	Ah Ya (阿雅)		
2010	Fighting Spiders		Season 2	
2010–2011	Dream School		Season 1 and 2	
2010	Knockout			
2009	Housewives' Holiday 煮妇的假期			
2009	Splash			

=== Variety shows ===
Year	Title	Role	Notes	Ref.
2016	My Squad is Better Than Yours	Competition singer	Formed Team Athena with The Final 1 season 1's winner, Farisha (team leader), Faith Ng and Jean Kyaw.	
2015	Star Squad	Celebrity mentor	Episode 7	
