= Anything Is Possible =

Anything Is Possible may refer to:

- Anything Is Possible (Debbie Gibson album), 1990
  - "Anything Is Possible" (Debbie Gibson song)
- Anything Is Possible (Darren Ockert album), 2005
- "Anything Is Possible" (Will Young song), 2002
- Anything Is Possible (film), 2013
- Anything Is Possible (book), 2017 novel by Elizabeth Strout

== See also ==
- Anything's Possible, a sculpture by Linda Serrao
- Anything's Possible (film), a 2022 romantic comedy
- Tout est possible!, 1974 history book of French leftism by Jean Rabaut
- 2008 NBA Finals, in which Kevin Garnett of the Boston Celtics famously said “Anything is possible!”, after the Celtics had won the finals.
