= American Idol Season 11 Highlights =

American Idol Season 11 Highlights may refer to:

- American Idol Season 11 Highlights (Hollie Cavanagh EP), 2012
- American Idol Season 11 Highlights (Jessica Sanchez EP), 2012
- American Idol Season 11 Highlights (Joshua Ledet EP), 2012
- American Idol Season 11 Highlights (Phillip Phillips EP), 2012
- American Idol Season 11 Highlights (Skylar Laine EP), 2012
