= Michael Chua =

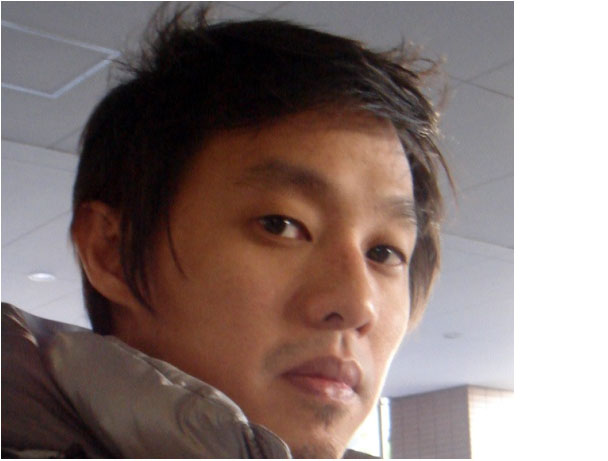
- Michael in Tokyo, Japan December 2008
- Born: Michael Chua; Singapore
- Other name: Wieszcz
- Years active: 1997 - present
- Spouse: Akemi Kumagai

Michael Chua is a film producer, film director and poet from Singapore. Michael graduated from the Film, Sound and Video department of Ngee Ann Polytechnic in 1997. Upon embarking on his professional career, he has directed and shot various projects of different genres, including music videos, commercials, TV dramas and feature length movies.

In 2013, Chua started Skyshot with his business partner to add aerial and drones capabilities to his work.

In 2021, Chua joined the Youtube series Titan Academy, directed and written by JianHao Tan, as Mr. Alan.

== Selected filmography ==
Director of Photography

- Home (Music video) (starring Kit Chan)
- Water (Music video)
- Moments of Magic (Music video) (starring Fann Wong)
- Kleenex (TV Commercial)
- Guan Xin Tai (TV Commercial)
- Indocafe (TV Commercial)
- The Best Bet (Feature Length Movie)
- Love Poetry (Telemovie) MediaCorp 5

Director

- Incredible Tales (Horror) MediaCorp 5
- Beach 360 (Travelogue) HD Channel Mediacorp
- Full Circle (Docu-Drama) MediaCorp 5
- Beyond the Dot (6x30min Infotainment) Channel News Asia
- Singapore Arrival Video (Inflight Entertainment)
- Health Sciences Authority (Corporate Video)

Executive Producer

- ALYA (13 X 1 hour Drama) (HD) Indonesia TV
- Oh Lucy! (22min Short Film)

== Awards ==
- Shadow of Death (Director of Photography)
  - Special Achievement Award at the Singapore International Film Festival 1997
  - Invited for screening at the BBC International Short Film Festival
- Saying Goodbye (Director)
  - Finalist at the Singapore International Film Festival 1997
- His Name Was Wong (Director of Photography)
  - Finalist at the Singapore International Film Festival 1997
- Sons (Director of Photography)
  - Best Film & Special Achievement Award at the Singapore International Film Festival 2000
- Oh Lucy (Executive Producer)
  - Official Selection and 2nd Prize at the Cinéfondation 2014

Awards and achievements
Preceded by Datura	Singapore International Film Festival Award for Best Short Film; 2000 for Sons	Succeeded by No Award
