= Moments of Magic =

1999 song

"Moments of Magic" is Singapore's official millennium song.

Performed by a pop trio comprising Singapore's Fann Wong, Tanya Chua and Elsa Lin, the song was released on an AVCD format in Singapore.

The theme song of Singapore's millennium celebrations on 31 December 1999 was composed by Ken Lim. The music video was directed by Eric Khoo and the Director of Photography was Michael Chua.

== Track listing ==
1. Moments of Magic (song)
2. Moments of Magic (MTV)
3. Moments of Magic (instrumental version)
4. Moments of Magic (karaoke version)
5. 分享这一刻 （Chinese Version)
