= Me, You & the Music =

Studio album by Jessica Sanchez
- Released: April 30, 2013
- Recorded: July 2012 – January 2013
- Genres: Pop; R&B
- Length: 40:11
- Labels: 19; Interscope
- Producers: Mark J. Feist; Toby Gad; Harvey Mason, Jr.; Ne-Yo; JR Rotem; AFSHeeN; Rykeyz

Jessica Sanchez chronology
American Idol Season 11 Highlights (2012)	Me, You & the Music (2013)

Singles from Me, You & the Music
- 1. "Tonight" Released: March 21, 2013

Me, You & the Music is the debut studio album by American singer Jessica Sanchez, released on April 30, 2013 by Interscope Records and 19 Entertainment. The album's lead single, "Tonight" features American R&B singer Ne-Yo and was released to all digital retailers on March 21, 2013. The song's accompanying music video was shot in downtown Los Angeles on March 1, 2013, with director Justin Francis.

== Background ==
Following the series finale of the eleventh season of American Idol Sanchez was signed to Interscope Records/19 Entertainment to begin work on her debut studio album. Recording for the album began during the American Idols Live! Tour 2012 in mid-July. She worked with producers Mark J. Feist, Harvey Mason, Jr. and Toby Gad among others for the album. It was set to feature ballads but would exhibit "more of an R&B/Pop/Urban kind of feel". The album's recording and production wrapped in mid January 2013 where the final track listing was selected mixed and mastered. It was initially set for release on May 14, 2013, but this was later moved up to April 30. Fans of American Idol have gotten used to a full-length debut from that season's winner and, typically, a few weeks later, an album from the year's runner-up. Season 11, however, was different, as Sanchez was allowed more time on the project to craft the right sound and direction for the album.

Jason Morey, executive vice president and worldwide head of music for 19 Entertainment told MTV News that the management company was in no hurry to rush Sanchez's debut out. "We wanted to develop her into an artist with longevity, and wanted her to put out a product that truly showcased her as the artist she wants to be and we wanted to take the time to make it perfect," he said. "She is truly a world class singer and we wanted to put her with the biggest producers and writers in the business ... She literally blew everyone away in the studio with her talent and as she began working, more opportunities arose for her to work with different people."' When speaking on the wait for the album Sanchez said, "I wanted to make it perfect for the fans. "I've worked in the studio before, but going to that next level with such high producers? It was crazy ... working with Ne-Yo. Everything was such a blur and I was just a fangirl the whole time." The album was later confirmed to have 11 tracks. A planned deluxe edition with 16 tracks did not eventuate.

== Commercial performance ==
Me, You & the Music entered the US Billboard 200 albums chart at number 26 with 14,000 units sold.

== Singles ==
"Tonight" is the lead single from the album and features American R&B singer Ne-Yo. It was released on March 21, 2013. Filming for the music video began on March 1, 2013 in downtown Los Angeles with director Justin Francis. Sanchez premiered the song for the first time live on the Top 9 results show on twelfth season of American Idol on March 21, 2013.

The second single was scheduled to be released in November, but due to Typhoon Yolanda, she recorded "Lead Me Home", a cover from "Heartbeat of Home" with composer Brian Bryne with sales going to people affected by the storm.

=== Promotional singles ===
"Plastic Roses" was released as a promotional single from the album, which was written and co-produced by R&B singer Ne-Yo. It was released on August 3, 2013 in the Philippines through MCA Music. "Right To Fall" was released as a promotional single.

== Critical reception ==
Professional ratings
Review scores
Source	Rating
AllMusic	3/5 stars
Idolator	3.5/5 stars

The album received mixed reviews from critics. AllMusic gave it 3 out of 5 stars, commending Sanchez's 2013 major-label debut. It stated that Me, You & the Music created a showcase for the Idol runner-up's big, soulful voice and contemporary pop style. The review compared it to Rihanna's songs that could translate to club & radio-ready songs, with "Drive By" and "Right To Fall" identified as standout tracks. However, AllMusic criticized the album for what it considered to be its weak lyrical interpretations. Emily Tan of Idolator gave 3.5 out of 5 stars said that Sanchez has proved you don't need to win a singing competition to put out a winning album.

== Track listing ==
Me, You & the Music – Standard edition
No.	Title	Writer(s)	Producer(s)	Length
1.	"Right to Fall"	Ester Dean, Harvey Mason, Jr., Damon Thomas, Chris Buettner, Marcello Pagin	The Underdogs	3:13
2.	"Tonight" (featuring Ne-Yo)	Shaffer Smith, Mikkel S. Eriksen, Tor E. Hermansen	Stargate	3:58
3.	"Don't Come Around"	J.R Rotem, Olivia Waithe, David Stewart, Tom Petty	J.R. Rotem	3:18
4.	"Crazy Glue"	Rune Westberg, Victoria Horn, J. Russel, H. Russel,	Rune Westberg	3:37
5.	"No One Compares" (featuring Prince Royce)	Geoffrey Rojas, Toby Gad, Makeba Riddick, Benny Benassi, Alle Benassi, Sanchez	Toby Gad, Benassi Bros., AFSHeeN (Additional Prod.)	3:36
6.	"In Your Hands"	Crystal Nicole Johnson, Gad	Toby Gad	4:23
7.	"Plastic Roses"	S. Smith, Jesse Wilson, Reginald Smith, Sanchez	Jesse "Corparal" Wilson, Reginald Smith, (Co) Shaffer Smith	3:31
8.	"Drive By"	Toby Gad, Jazmine Sullivan	Toby Gad	3:01
9.	"You've Got the Love"	Mason, Thomas, LaShawn Daniels, Eric Dawkins, Dewain Whitmore, Buettner, Pagin, Sanchez	The Underdogs	3:44
10.	"Gentlemen"	Gad, Sia Furler	Toby Gad	4:12
11.	"No One Compares" (Spanglish version featuring Prince Royce)	Rojas, Gad, Riddick, A. Benassi, M. Benassi, Sanchez	Toby Gad, Benassi Bros., AFSHeeN (Additional Prod.)	3:38

Me, You & the Music – fan bundle additional digital song
No.	Title	Writer(s)	Producer(s)	Length
12.	"More Than Just Friends"	Mark J. Feist	Mark J. Feist	3:17

Me, You & the Music – Philippines edition bonus tracks
No.	Title	Writer(s)	Producer(s)	Length
11.	"Fairytale"	Mikkel S. Eriksen, Tor E. Hermansen, Sanchez	Stargate	3:48
12.	"Lightning"	Mark J. Feist, Celeste Scalone	Mark J. Feist	3:33
13.	"No One Compares" (Spanglish version featuring Prince Royce)	Rojas, Gad, Riddick, A. Benassi, M. Benassi, Sanchez	Toby Gad, Benassi Bros., AFSHeeN (Additional Prod.)	3:38

- "Don't Come Around" contains an interpolation of "Don't Come Around Here No More" By Tom Petty and the Heartbreakers.

== Release formats ==
Standard version

- Jewel case packaging
- Standard 11 tracks

Philippines edition

- Jewel case packaging
- Standard 11 tracks + 2 songs

Exclusive fan bundle (available only in the US)

- Jewel case packaging
- Standard 11 tracks
- Exclusive digital booklet
- Additional digital song "More Than Just Friends"
- Collectible inspirational metal bracelet
- Instant download of Jessica's new song "Tonight ft. Ne-Yo"
- Signed album (limited copies)

== Charts ==
Chart (2013)	Peak position
US Billboard 200	26
