= The Final 1 season 1 =

The Final 1
- Season 1
- Hosted by: Vanessa Vanderstraaten; Mike Kasem
- Judges: Taufik Batisah; Kit Chan; Ken Lim
- Winner: Farisha Ishak
- Runner-up: Shaun Jansen
- Finals venue: The Star Theatre

Release
- Original network: MediaCorp Channel 5
- Original release: 24 April – 21 August 2013

Season chronology
- Next → Season 2

The first season of The Final 1 premiered on MediaCorp Channel 5 on 24 April 2013. It is a Singaporean reality-singing competition programme created by the director of Hype Records Ken Lim. The judges were singer-songwriter Taufik Batisah, singer-actress Kit Chan and Ken Lim. Fly Entertainment artiste Vanessa Vanderstraaten was employed as the host of the show. Class 95FM radio personality Mike Kasem later joined the show as the second host, and hosted the finals together with Vanderstraaten.

The show is also the first in Singapore's history to produce a female winner from an English-based major reality-singing competition programme. The past winners from Singapore Idol, a similar programme which has already ended its run in 2009, were all males.

On 21 August 2013, Farisha Ishak was announced the winner of the first season of The Final 1, beating Shaun Jansen, the recipient of the Wild Card save. She received a $50,000 record deal from Hype Records and a cash prize of $50,000.

Farisha, as the winner, signed to a record label. Ken Lim originally stated he had no plans to sign any of the other finalists from the competition. However, on 23 September, it was announced Hype Records also signed Jansen to its label.

== Online auditions ==
The show is open to all citizens and permanent residents of Singapore aged 16 to 32 as of 1 January 2013. The online auditions began on 11 January 2013 and ended on 15 February 2013. To participate in the auditions, all contestants must register themselves at the official website of the show and submit an audition video of no more than five minutes long. Over 1,000 audition clips were submitted for the competition. Out of all auditionees, 60 were selected by the judges as the top 60 contestants and they were invited to perform in front of them at the top 60 round.

== Top 60 round ==
The top 60 round were held in W Singapore Sentosa Cove where the 60 contestants that were handpicked by the judges from the online auditions competed for a place in the top 40 rounds. Although 60 online auditionees were chosen, only 56 of them turned up for this round of the competition. Hence, four of the top 60 finalists eliminated themselves from the competition prior to the start of the top 60 round. The contestants first emerged on stage in groups but performed individually with a backing track or by playing with a musical instrument. At the end of all performances, 16 contestants who did not impress the judges were eliminated, and the remaining top 40 contestants advanced to the next round.

== Top 40 finalists ==
The following is a list of top 40 finalists who failed to reach the top 20 live rounds:

Contestant	Age at time of show	Occupation	Audition song	Top 60 round song
Harris Baba	21	National serviceman	"Let Me Love You"	
Zarinah Bahtiar	28	Freelancer	"Use Somebody"	"Titanium"
Boon Hui Lu	19	Student	"Pumped Up Kicks"	Not aired
Joey Chua	18	Student	"The Voice Within"	
Farah Erfina	21	Student	"Forget You"	"Thinking of You"
Fathin Amira	20	Self-employed	"Put Your Records On"	
Trella Goh	19	Student	"If I Ain't Got You"	Not aired
Alex Hong	23	Student	"Sunday Morning"	"Like I Love You"
Hydir Idris	20	Student	"One in a Million"	"The Last Time"
Kamsani Jumahat	22	Student	"Mercy" / "I Believe I Can Fly"	"Mercy"

Contestant	Age at time of show	Occupation	Audition song	Top 60 round song
Hariz Maloy	19	Student	"It's Time"	"Brokenhearted"
Mohamed Amirul	20	Student	"Feeling Good"	"Mercy"
Mohammad Sufie	22	Musician-songwriter	"Faithfully"	
Khim Ng	20	Performer	"Nobody's Perfect"	
Sherly Ng	20	Student	"...Baby One More Time" / "This Love"	"Fallin'"
Charmaine Pelaez	26	Musician	"You Oughta Know"	
Danial Razak	21	Student	"We Found Love"	Not aired
Kassandra Sulastri	21	Freelance performer	"Rolling in the Deep"	
Maggie Syazana	18	Student	"Video Games"	
Marc Than	28	Banker	"I Don't Want to Be"	Not aired

== Top 40 rounds ==
The top 40 performance rounds started on 1 May and took place at a venue sponsored by The P' Club Group while the results were shown live from MediaCorp TV Theatre. The forty contestants who made it competed in this round and only twenty moved on. The contestants were divided into four groups of ten. Each week, the top 5 vote-getters of the week were revealed during the live results show but it was not a guarantee that they were able to advance to the next round. At the end of all top 40 rounds, all contestants were ranked and the twenty contestants with the most public votes advanced to the next round while the remaining twenty contestants were eliminated. Each group performed in front of the judges and was accompanied by a live band. From this round onwards, the results were solely based on the public votes. The viewers were able to cast their votes via telephone, SMS text voting and the show's Facebook application. Votes cast via the telephone and SMS text voting made up 60% of the total votes, while the remaining 40% was determined by the number of votes received from the show's Facebook application.

=== Group 1 ===
Order	Contestant	Song	Result	
Order	Contestant	Song	Group 1	Overall
1	Khim Ng	"Oh! Darling"	Bottom 5 (6th–9th)	Eliminated
2	Joey Chua	"How Do I Live"	Bottom 5 (6th–9th)	Eliminated
3	Farisha Ishak	"Rumour Has It"	Top 5 (2nd–3rd)	Advanced
4	Hariz Maloy	"It's Time"	Bottom 5 (6th–9th)	Eliminated
5	Gail Belmonte	"If I Ain't Got You"	Top 5 (2nd–3rd)	Advanced
6	Marc Than	"Zombie"	Bottom 5 (6th–9th)	Eliminated
7	Zarinah Bahtiar	"Only So Much Oil in the Ground"	Top 5 (4th–5th)	Eliminated
8	Viveck Raam	"Lips of an Angel"	Top 5 (1st)	Advanced
9	Trella Goh	"Stronger (What Doesn't Kill You)"	Bottom (10th)	Eliminated
10	Mohammad Sufie	"Rolling in the Deep"	Top 5 (4th–5th)	Eliminated

- Best Vocal Performance (Kit Chan's choice): Gail Belmonte, Farisha Ishak & Marc Than
- Best Individual Style (Taufik Batisah's choice): Farisha Ishak, Khim Ng & Marc Than
- Most Marketability (Ken Lim's choice): None

=== Group 2 ===
Order	Contestant	Song	Result	
Order	Contestant	Song	Group 2	Overall
1	Shanice Hedger	"Torn"	Top 5 (2nd–4th)	Advanced
2	Boon Hui Lu	"Speechless"	Bottom 5 (6th–10th)	Eliminated
3	Mohamed Amirul	"Halo" / "Sweet Dreams"	Top 5 (5th)	Eliminated
4	Kamsani Jumahat	"Superstition"	Bottom 5 (6th–10th)	Eliminated
5	Sherly Ng	"(You Make Me Feel Like) A Natural Woman"	Bottom 5 (6th–10th)	Eliminated
6	Raina Sum	"I (Who Have Nothing)"	Top 5 (2nd–4th)	Advanced
7	Hydir Idris	"The Last Time"	Bottom 5 (6th–10th)	Eliminated
8	Jean Kyaw	"Moves like Jagger"	Top 5 (2nd–4th)	Advanced
9	Yuresh Balakrishnan	"Skinny Love"	Top 5 (1st)	Advanced
10	Alex Hong	"Like I Love You"	Bottom 5 (6th–10th)	Eliminated

- Best Vocal Performance (Kit Chan's choice): Yuresh Balakrishnan, Hydir Idris & Kamsani Jumahat
- Best Individual Style (Taufik Batisah's choice): Yuresh Balakrishnan & Alex Hong
- Most Marketability (Ken Lim's choice): None

=== Group 3 ===
Order	Contestant	Song	Result	
Order	Contestant	Song	Group 3	Overall
1	Glen Wee	"High Hopes"	Top 5 (2nd–5th)	Advanced
2	Meryl Joan Lee	"Big Spender"	Top 5 (1st)	Advanced
3	Enriquo Garcia	"Harder to Breathe"	Bottom 5 (6th–8th)	Advanced
4	Kassandra Sulastri	"Domino"	Bottom 5 (9th–10th)	Eliminated
5	Cyril Toh	"A Moment Like This"	Top 5 (2nd–5th)	Advanced
6	Laraine Lam	"This Love"	Bottom 5 (6th–8th)	Advanced
7	D.J. Borries	"Who's Lovin' You"	Top 5 (2nd–5th)	Advanced
8	Fathin Amira	"If I Were a Boy"	Bottom 5 (9th–10th)	Eliminated
9	Hashy Yusof	"Black and Gold"	Top 5 (2nd–5th)	Advanced
10	Debbi Koh	"Decode"	Bottom 5 (6th–8th)	Advanced

- Best Individual Style (Taufik Batisah's choice): Glen Wee & Hashy Yusof
- Best Vocal Performance (Kit Chan's choice): Glen Wee & Hashy Yusof
- Most Marketability (Ken Lim's choice): Glen Wee & Hashy Yusof

=== Group 4 ===
Order	Contestant	Song	Result	
Order	Contestant	Song	Group 4	Overall
1	Cheryl K	"Mamma Knows Best"	Top 5 (2nd–5th)	Advanced
2	Danial Razak	"Little Things"	Bottom 5 (6th–10th)	Eliminated
3	E.T. Ong	"Toxic"	Top 5 (2nd–5th)	Advanced
4	Charmaine Pelaez	"Billie Jean"	Bottom 5 (6th–10th)	Eliminated
5	Farah Erfina	"Wings"	Bottom 5 (6th–10th)	Eliminated
6	Louisa Kan	"When I Was Your Man"	Top 5 (1st)	Advanced
7	Harris Baba	"Torn"	Bottom 5 (6th–10th)	Eliminated
8	Faith Ng	"...Baby One More Time"	Top 5 (2nd–5th)	Advanced
9	Maggie Syazana	"Valerie"	Bottom 5 (6th–10th)	Eliminated
10	Shaun Jansen	"I Don't Love You"	Top 5 (2nd–5th)	Advanced

- Best Vocal Performance (Kit Chan's choice): Shaun Jansen, Cheryl K, Louisa Kan & Danial Razak
- Best Individual Style (Taufik Batisah's choice): Shaun Jansen & Danial Razak
- Most Marketability (Ken Lim's choice): Shaun Jansen

== Top 20 finalists ==
The following is a list of top 20 finalists who failed to reach the finals:

Contestant	Age at time of show	Occupation	Audition song	Top 60 round song
D.J. Borries	22	Model	"If I Ain't Got You"	Not aired
Enriquo Garcia	21	Pyrotechnician	"I Don't Want to Miss a Thing"	Not aired
Shanice Hedger	17	Student	"Titanium"	
Cheryl K	17	Student	"Trouble" / "I Knew You Were Trouble"	
Laraine Lam	19	Student	"She Left Me"	"I Can't Make You Love Me"

Contestant	Age at time of show	Occupation	Audition song	Top 60 round song
E.T. Ong	25	Full-time performer	"Impossible"	"Grace Kelly"
Viveck Raam	20	National serviceman	"Last Request"	
Raina Sum	18	Student	"Nobody's Perfect"	
Cyril Toh	20	Student	"Try"	

== Top 20 live rounds ==
The top 20 live rounds started on 29 May. The top 20 finalists performed live at the MediaCorp TV Theatre from this round onwards, and the results were also shown live from the same venue. The remaining contestants were once again divided into groups of ten to perform on two separate nights. Similar to the top 40 rounds, each week the weekly top 4 vote-getters were revealed during the live results show but it was not a guarantee that they were able to advance to the next round. At the end of both top 20 live rounds, all contestants were ranked and the eight contestants with the most public votes advanced to the top 10 live rounds. The remaining twelve contestants were put through to the wild card round on 12 June to compete for the final two spots in the top 10. Each group performed live in front of the judges and studio audience, and was accompanied by dancers and stage props.

=== Group 1 ===
Order	Contestant	Song	Result	
Order	Contestant	Song	Group 1	Overall
1	Meryl Joan Lee	"Tainted Love"	Top 4	Advanced
2	Shanice Hedger	"Love the Way You Lie (Part II)"	Bottom 6	Wild Card
3	Gail Belmonte	"Skyscraper"	Top 4	Advanced
4	Jean Kyaw	"I Turn to You"	Top 4	Advanced
5	Viveck Raam	"I Saw Her Standing There"	Bottom 6	Wild Card
6	Cyril Toh	"If I Lose Myself"	Bottom 6	Wild Card
7	D.J. Borries	"Kiss" / "Brokenhearted"	Bottom 6	Wild Card
8	Hashy Yusof	"Heartbreaker"	Bottom 6	Wild Card
9	Yuresh Balakrishnan	"We All Try"	Bottom 6	Wild Card
10	Farisha Ishak	"Ordinary People"	Top 4	Advanced

- Most Relatability (Taufik Batisah's choice): Yuresh Balakrishnan & Farisha Ishak
- Best Stage Presence (Kit Chan's choice): Yuresh Balakrishnan, Farisha Ishak & Meryl Joan Lee
- Most Sustainability (Ken Lim's choice): Meryl Joan Lee

=== Group 2 ===
Order	Contestant	Song	Result	
Order	Contestant	Song	Group 2	Overall
1	Raina Sum	"Crazy"	Bottom 6	Wild Card
2	Laraine Lam	"Safe & Sound"	Bottom 6	Wild Card
3	Debbi Koh	"Suit & Tie"	Top 4	Advanced
4	Cheryl K	"One Night Only"	Bottom 6	Wild Card
5	E.T. Ong	"Locked Out of Heaven"	Bottom 6	Wild Card
6	Glen Wee	"Mirrors"	Top 4	Advanced
7	Louisa Kan	"Forget You"	Top 4	Advanced
8	Faith Ng	"Chasing Pavements"	Top 4	Advanced
9	Enriquo Garcia	"Marry You"	Bottom 6	Wild Card
10	Shaun Jansen	"Mr. Brightside"	Bottom 6	Wild Card

- Best Stage Presence (Kit Chan's choice): Shaun Jansen & Glen Wee
- Most Relatability (Taufik Batisah's choice): Shaun Jansen & Glen Wee
- Most Sustainability (Ken Lim's choice): Cheryl K & Glen Wee

=== Wild Card round – Ethnic Songs ===
Following those eight contestants advancing on 5 June, the remaining twelve top 20 finalists competed in the Wild Card round for the final two spots in the top 10. All contestants performed an ethnic song of their choice. Following another performance by each Wild Card contender, the judges selected two contestants to advance to the final group of 10.

Order	Contestant	Song	Result
1	Cheryl K	"Jelingan Manja"	Eliminated
2	E.T. Ong	"Hei Se You Mo"	Eliminated
3	Shanice Hedger	"Beribu Sesalan"	Eliminated
4	Enriquo Garcia	"Kiss Goodbye"	Eliminated
5	Laraine Lam	"Liu Sha"	Eliminated
6	Cyril Toh	"Tong Hua"	Eliminated
7	Shaun Jansen	"Tian Gao Di Hou"	Saved
8	Viveck Raam	"Vellai Pookal"	Eliminated
9	D.J. Borries	"Kaulah Segalanya"	Eliminated
10	Yuresh Balakrishnan	"An Jing"	Advanced
11	Raina Sum	"San Ren You"	Eliminated
12	Hashy Yusof	"Terukir Di Bintang"	Advanced

After Yuresh Balakrishnan and Hashy Yusof were selected as the two wild card picks to advance to the top 10, Ken Lim revealed that one of the wild card contestants that was not selected as the wild card pick would be saved from elimination and join the top 10 contestants to form a surprise top 11. In reference to the weekly judges' choices from the past six result shows that highlighted contestants with potential as commercial artists, the choices were converted to points and the non-selected wild card contender with the highest score was saved. Shaun Jansen was announced as the non-selected wild card contender with the highest score and was sent through to the next round as the 11th contestant.

== Finalists ==
The following is a list of top 11 finalists:

Contestant	Age at time of show	Occupation	Audition song	Top 60 round song	Contestant	Age at time of show	Occupation	Audition song	Top 60 round song
Farisha Ishak	18	Student	"Make You Feel My Love"	"American Boy"	Louisa Kan	17	Student	"Someone like You"	
Shaun Jansen	27	Marketing executive	"We Are the Champions"	"Wanted Dead or Alive"	Debbi Koh	16	Student	"Payphone"	"Diamonds"
Jean Kyaw	19	Student	"Reflection"		Yuresh Balakrishnan	20	Student	"The Girl"	"Dream a Little Dream of Me"
Glen Wee	19	Student	"Animal" / "Baby"	"Too Close"	Faith Ng	17	Student	"As Long as You Love Me"	"Wings"
Meryl Joan Lee	24	Freelance singer	"The Nearness of You"	"How Come U Don't Call Me Anymore?"	Hashy Yusof	18	Student	"Fix You"	"Candy"
Gail Belmonte	17	Student	"Listen"						

== Finals ==
The finals started on 19 June. In this season, there are nine weeks of the finals and 11 finalists, with one finalist eliminated per week based on the Singaporean public's votes (exceptions include top 8-week, where the judges were able to decide who would go home and eliminated three contestants, and the first top 4-week, which was revealed as a surprise non-elimination round). The finalists were housed at W Singapore Sentosa Cove to attend bootcamp sessions. The finals were once again broadcast from MediaCorp TV Theatre in front of a live studio audience, with the exception of the top 2 finale which took place at The Star Theatre. All performances were accompanied by a live band and backing vocalists. Class 95FM radio personality Mike Kasem was named as the second host of the show on the top 11-week.

=== Top 11 – Their Personal Branding ===
Mentor: Lionel Roudaut

The top 11 finalists were tasked to work on their personal branding, which could assist them in building fan loyalty and differentiating themselves from the others. Lasalle College of the Arts fashion design programme leader Lionel Roudaut, together with judge Kit Chan were employed as image advisers for the top 11 finalists. The contestants then worked with their respective fashion designers, hairstylists, and beauty consultants to produce their own personal image which was later presented on the show.

Order	Contestant	Song	Result
1	Louisa Kan	"Just Give Me a Reason"	Safe
2	Yuresh Balakrishnan	"Fix You"	Safe
3	Farisha Ishak	"Next to Me"	Safe
4	Faith Ng	"Beautiful"	Safe
5	Jean Kyaw	"Inseparable"	Safe
6	Meryl Joan Lee	"Angel"	Safe Last
7	Gail Belmonte	"Change Your Life"	Safe
8	Debbi Koh	"So Sick"	Safe
9	Shaun Jansen	"Hallelujah"	Safe
10	Hashy Yusof	"You're the One That I Want"	Eliminated
11	Glen Wee	"Creep"	Safe Last

- Group performance: "What Makes You Beautiful"
- Best Image (Lionel Roudaut's choice): Glen Wee

=== Top 10 – Social Media Challenge ===
Mentor: Khalid Almkhlaafy

The top 10 finalists were put to a "Social Media Challenge" in which they had to come up with creative ideas for an online viral video which reflects their own thoughts and ideals. Lasalle College of the Arts broadcast media programme leader Khalid Almkhlaafy was employed to conduct a guiding workshop for the top 10 finalists. The contestants also worked with the students from Lasalle College of the Arts to conceptualize and produce videos that were based on each of the contestants' original ideas. The videos were then uploaded to the YouTube channel of MediaCorp Channel 5 and the contestants were tasked to promote their own video on social media platforms.

Order	Contestant	Song	Featured Video	Result
1	Gail Belmonte	"Since U Been Gone"	Second Chances with Gail	Safe
2	Debbi Koh	"Somebody That I Used to Know"	Debbidoodares	Safe
3	Faith Ng	"Big Girls Don't Cry"	Impersonator Impersonations	Eliminated
4	Shaun Jansen	"Sexy and I Know It"	A Face to the Crowd	Safe
5	Yuresh Balakrishnan	"Hey Ya!"	Heart and Sound	Safe
6	Jean Kyaw	"Good Girl"	How Did She Levitate?!?!	Safe
7	Meryl Joan Lee	"I Won't Give Up"	Spontaneous #LoveThroughMusic	Safe
8	Glen Wee	"Impossible"	Glen Final 1	Safe Last
9	Louisa Kan	"Love, Me"	Pieces of You – Original	Safe
10	Farisha Ishak	"Lately"	Flash Sing at Cineleisure	Safe

- Group performance: "Get Lucky"
- Most Effective Video (Khalid Almkhlaafy's choice): Shaun Jansen (A Face to the Crowd)
- Most Viewed Video: Shaun Jansen (A Face to the Crowd)

=== Top 9 – Songs for Their Families & Friends ===
Each contestant performed a song as a dedication to their families and friends.

Order	Contestant	Song	Result
1	Farisha Ishak	"You've Got a Friend"	Safe
2	Yuresh Balakrishnan	"Can't Help Falling in Love"	Eliminated
3	Glen Wee	"I Don't Need No Doctor"	Safe
4	Debbi Koh	"Come & Get It" / "Hotel California"	Safe
5	Jean Kyaw	"To Love You More"	Safe
6	Gail Belmonte	"The Prayer"	Safe
7	Louisa Kan	"Bless the Broken Road"	Safe
8	Meryl Joan Lee	"God Bless the Child"	Safe
9	Shaun Jansen	"I'll Stand by You"	Safe Last

- Group performance: "Love Somebody"

=== Top 8 – Judges' Choice ===
Each contestant performed a song chosen by the judges.

Prior to the performance show, all contestants attended a mentoring session with their respective judge who chose their song. Similar to the Wild Card round, there was no public voting and the judges decided on the contestants to eliminate from the competition.

Order	Contestant	Song	Chosen By	Result
1	Meryl Joan Lee	"I Can't Make You Love Me"	Taufik Batisah	Safe
2	Louisa Kan	"A Thousand Years"	Taufik Batisah	Eliminated
3	Debbi Koh	"Pumped Up Kicks"	Taufik Batisah	Eliminated
4	Gail Belmonte	"Need You Now"	Kit Chan	Eliminated
5	Glen Wee	"Babylon"	Kit Chan	Safe
6	Jean Kyaw	"Skyfall"	Kit Chan	Safe
7	Shaun Jansen	"Forever and Always"	Ken Lim	Safe
8	Farisha Ishak	"I Look to You"	Ken Lim	Safe

- Group performance: "Best Day of My Life"

=== Top 5 – Songs for Their Fans ===
Each contestant performed two songs as a dedication to their fans.

Order	Contestant	Song	Result
1	Glen Wee	"Live High"	Safe
2	Jean Kyaw	"Try"	Safe Last
3	Shaun Jansen	"High and Dry"	Safe
4	Meryl Joan Lee	"Feels Like Home"	Eliminated
5	Farisha Ishak	"Get Here"	Safe
6	Jean Kyaw	"Exhale (Shoop Shoop)"	Safe Last
7	Meryl Joan Lee	"Unwritten"	Eliminated
8	Glen Wee	"Imagine"	Safe
9	Farisha Ishak	"Put Your Records On"	Safe
10	Shaun Jansen	"Semi-Charmed Life"	Safe

- Group performance: "Cups"

=== Top 4 (first week) – Meet the Press Challenge ===
Each contestant performed two songs during the performance show. In addition, each contestant was given a question by the judges to assess their ability to respond.

The top 4 finalists were put to a test in media-related situations this week. They attended a photo shoot session with 8 Days magazine, a press conference held at ME@OUE, and a radio talk show, 987 Home with Rozz, hosted by 987FM radio personality Rosalyn Lee. The most media savvy contestant was given the "Eclipse Meet the Press Challenge Award" with $500 worth of prizes.

Order	Contestant	Song	Result
1	Jean Kyaw	"Set Fire to the Rain"	Safe
2	Farisha Ishak	"Let's Stay Together"	Safe
3	Shaun Jansen	"No Woman, No Cry"	Safe
4	Glen Wee	"Angels Brought Me Here"	Safe
5	Jean Kyaw	"Dance with My Father"	Safe
6	Farisha Ishak	"One and Only"	Safe
7	Shaun Jansen	"Summer of '69"	Safe
8	Glen Wee	"Not Over You"	Safe

- Judges' questions:
  - Farisha Ishak: Should you leave the competition tonight, what would you say you can take away from this competition? What have you learnt? – posted by Taufik Batisah
  - Shaun Jansen: Are you worried that people are harping more on your looks than your talent and what do you intend to do about it? – posted by Kit Chan
  - Jean Kyaw: Do you think you should be the Final 1 and why? – posted by Ken Lim
  - Glen Wee: How much do you want to be the Final 1? What are you willing to do to be the winner? – posted by Taufik Batisah
- Group performances:
  - Farisha Ishak, Shaun Jansen, Jean Kyaw & Glen Wee: "Paparazzi"
  - Jean Kyaw & Glen Wee: "My Boo"
  - Farisha Ishak & Shaun Jansen: "You and I"
- Eclipse Meet the Press Challenge Award: Shaun Jansen – presented by Rosalyn Lee

On the results show, all contestants were declared safe and no one was eliminated. However, Ken Lim stated the elimination was confirmed and the results would be announced the following week.

=== Top 4 (second week) – Their Original Songs ===
Mentor: Rai

Each contestant performed two original songs – one that was co-written with songwriters from Ocean Butterflies Music Forest School, and the other that was written entirely by the contestants themselves. All original songs were set to showcase creativity and originality from the contestants. Rai, a singer-songwriter as well as the member of Singaporean duo Jack & Rai, was employed as songwriting advisor for the top 4 finalists.

There was no results show for this week. The contestant who received the fewest votes the previous week was eliminated at the end of the performance show.

Order	Contestant	Song	Written By	Result
1	Glen Wee	"All You've Got Is Love"	Self with Natalie Hiong & Morgan Law	Eliminated
2	Jean Kyaw	"You"	Self with Derrick Tham & Madeleine Tan	Safe
3	Farisha Ishak	"Smile"	Self with Elton Lee & Sin Sek Jhia	Safe
4	Shaun Jansen	"I Want You"	Self with Salyonn Han Koh & Maricelle Rani Wong	Safe
5	Glen Wee	"Untitled"	Self with Yuresh Balakrishnan	Eliminated
6	Jean Kyaw	"Under the Rain"	Self with Edwin Luke Wee	Safe
7	Farisha Ishak	"Life Is Beautiful"	Self	Safe
8	Shaun Jansen	"Here to Stay"	Self	Safe

It was revealed that Glen Wee received the fewest votes the previous week and was sent home. After the results were announced, Ken Lim explained the rationale of delaying the results for a week as to show the contestants the consequences of missing the opportunity to perform their best. In reference to Glen's elimination, he stated: "I did mention that all of you should treat all your performances as it would be your last. But your previous performances were not good. It's extremely unfortunate that you provided your best performance after opportunities have eluded you."

=== Top 3 – Reprise Performance ===
Each contestant reprised one of their previous performances. The rest of the top 11 finalists returned to the show this week to share about their journey throughout the competition.

There was once again no results show for this week. The public voting commenced after the performance show at 9:00pm the previous week. The voting lines and Facebook voting system stayed open till the start of the performance show at 8:00pm this week. The contestant who received the fewest votes from the one-week voting period was eliminated at the end of the performance show. Daily voting updates were published from 2 to 7 August 2013, via the MediaCorp Channel 5's Facebook page. The updates revealed the contestant with the most public votes as of 2:00pm on the particular day.

Order	Contestant	Song	Daily Voting Updates (as of 2pm)						Result
Order	Contestant	Song	2/8	3/8	4/8	5/8	6/8	7/8	Result
1	Farisha Ishak	"I Look to You"	Top	Top	Top	Bottom 2	Top	Bottom 2	Safe
2	Jean Kyaw	"Skyfall"	Bottom 2	Bottom 2	Bottom 2	Bottom 2	Bottom 2	Top	Eliminated
3	Shaun Jansen	"Sexy and I Know It"	Bottom 2	Bottom 2	Bottom 2	Top	Bottom 2	Bottom 2	Safe

- Group performance: "True Love"

=== Top 2 – Contestant's Choice / Contestant's Choice / Winner's Single ===
Each contestant performed two songs of their choice, and their debut single. The debut single, originally written by Ken Lim, was renditioned by Farisha Ishak in its disco version, while Shaun Jansen sang the pop rock version.

Besides voting through phone calls, text messaging, and Facebook, in a first for the entire season of the show, fans were offered the ability to vote for their favourite top 2 finalist through "gift-to-vote" – by purchasing the studio version of the original song performed by the respective top 2 finalists on the second top 4-week. Farisha Ishak's "Life Is Beautiful" and Shaun Jansen's "Here to Stay" are available for download via the MeRadio Store. Each song download was counted as one phone-in vote, which constituted 60% of the overall results. The "gift-to-vote" voting period commenced after the performance show at 9:00pm the previous week and ended at 11:59pm on 20 August 2013. The voting lines and Facebook voting system were made available at 8:30pm, after the first set of performances from the top 2 finalists during the performance show.

Order	Contestant	Song	Result
1	Farisha Ishak	"Ain't Nobody"	Winner
2	Shaun Jansen	"Viva la Vida"	Runner-up
3	Farisha Ishak	"Run"	Winner
4	Shaun Jansen	"Radioactive"	Runner-up
5	Shaun Jansen	"Tonight"	Runner-up
6	Farisha Ishak	"Tonight"	Winner

== Elimination chart ==
Females	Males	Top 40	Top 20	Top 11	Wild Card	Winner

Did Not Perform	Safe	Safe Last	Eliminated	Wild Card Save

Stage:		Top 40				Top 20		Wild Card	Finals								
Week:		1/5	8/5	15/5	22/5	29/5	5/6	12/6	19/6	26/6	3/7	10/7	17/7	24/7^{1}	31/7	7/8	21/8
Place	Contestant	Result															
1	Farisha Ishak	Top 20				Top 11											Winner
2	Shaun Jansen				Top 20		Wild Card	Top 11			Safe Last						Runner-up
3	Jean Kyaw		Top 20			Top 11							Safe Last			Elim	
4	Glen Wee			Top 20			Top 11		Safe Last	Safe Last					Elim		
5	Meryl Joan Lee			Top 20		Top 11			Safe Last				Elim				
6–8	Gail Belmonte	Top 20				Top 11						Elim					
6–8	Louisa Kan				Top 20		Top 11					Elim					
6–8	Debbi Koh			Top 20			Top 11					Elim					
9	Yuresh Balakrishnan		Top 20			Wild Card		Top 11			Elim						
10	Faith Ng				Top 20		Top 11			Elim							
11	Hashy Yusof			Top 20		Wild Card		Top 11	Elim								
12–20	D.J. Borries			Top 20		Wild Card		Elim									
12–20	Enriquo Garcia			Top 20			Wild Card	Elim									
12–20	Shanice Hedger		Top 20			Wild Card		Elim									
12–20	Cheryl K				Top 20		Wild Card	Elim									
12–20	Laraine Lam			Top 20			Wild Card	Elim									
12–20	E.T. Ong				Top 20		Wild Card	Elim									
12–20	Viveck Raam	Top 20				Wild Card		Elim									
12–20	Raina Sum		Top 20				Wild Card	Elim									
12–20	Cyril Toh			Top 20		Wild Card		Elim									
21–40	Harris Baba				Elim												
21–40	Farah Erfina				Elim												
21–40	Maggie Syazana				Elim												
21–40	Danial Razak				Elim												
21–40	Charmaine Pelaez				Elim												
21–40	Fathin Amira			Elim													
21–40	Kassandra Sulastri			Elim													
21–40	Boon Hui Lu		Elim														
21–40	Alex Hong		Elim														
21–40	Hydir Idris		Elim														
21–40	Kamsani Jumahat		Elim														
21–40	Mohamed Amirul		Elim														
21–40	Sherly Ng		Elim														
21–40	Zarinah Bahtiar	Elim															
21–40	Joey Chua	Elim															
21–40	Trella Goh	Elim															
21–40	Hariz Maloy	Elim															
21–40	Mohammad Sufie	Elim															
21–40	Khim Ng	Elim															
21–40	Marc Than	Elim															

^Note 1 During the week of 24 July, all contestants were declared safe and there was no eliminated contestant. However, the elimination has been confirmed and the contestant who had the fewest votes this week will be eliminated at the end of the performance show on the week of 31 July.

== Results show performances ==
Week	Performer(s)	Title	Performance type
Top 40 Group 1	Lai Yi Xuan	"Pirates of the Caribbean"	live
Top 40 Group 2	Flame of the Forest	"The Final Countdown"	live
Top 40 Group 3	Grandma Mary	"Samba Pa Ti"	live
Top 20 Group 1	Cilla Chan & Howard Chan	"Suit & Tie"	live
Wild Card round	Vocaluptuous	"Singapura, Sunny Island" / "Come Home"	live
Top 11	Hashy Yusof	"You're the One That I Want"	live
Top 10	Faith Ng	"Big Girls Don't Cry"	live
Top 9	Yuresh Balakrishnan	"Can't Help Falling in Love"	live
Top 8	Debbi Koh	"Pumped Up Kicks"	live
Top 8	Louisa Kan	"A Thousand Years"	live
Top 8	Gail Belmonte	"Need You Now"	live
Top 5	Meryl Joan Lee	"Unwritten"	live
Top 4 Week 2	Glen Wee	"Untitled"	live
Top 3	Jean Kyaw	"You"	live
Top 2	The Final 1 Top 11	"Treasure" / "Boogie Wonderland"	live
Top 2	Taufik Batisah, Farisha Ishak & Shaun Jansen	"Payphone"	live
Top 2	Taufik Batisah & Rui En	"Sky's the Limit"	live
Top 2	The Final 1 Top 11	"My Songs Know What You Did in the Dark (Light Em Up)"	live
Top 2	Jody Williams, Farisha Ishak & Shaun Jansen	"Without You"	live
Top 2	Jody Williams	"Listen"	live
Top 2	Natasha Bedingfield	"These Words"	live
Top 2	Natasha Bedingfield	"Unwritten"	live
Top 2	Farisha Ishak	"Tonight"	live

== Contestants who appeared on other shows ==
- Hydir Idris and Kamsani Jumahat originally appeared on Anugerah 2009. Hydir was eliminated in the top 3 boys semi-final round and finished in fifth place overall. Kamsani made it to the top 6 boys quarter-final round but was not offered to participate in the Wild Card round, and therefore finished in eleventh place overall. Kamsani went on to win as Karaoke World Championships Asia male champion in 2014. This is the world's biggest amateur singing competition where the world finals was held in Sweden in 2014.
- Khim Ng was a contestant on the first season of Campus SuperStar. She made it to the top 4 girls round and finished in seventh place overall.
- Meryl Joan Lee and Charmaine Pelaez originally appeared on the second season of Singapore Idol but was eliminated in the Piano Show round. Meryl was given the opportunity to participate in the Wild Card round, but rejected the offer.
- Fathin Amira finished in ninth place on the third season of Singapore Idol.
- Farah Erfina and Hashy Yusof auditioned for Anugerah and Singapore Idol respectively, but their placings are unknown.
