= American Idol Season 11 Highlights (Jessica Sanchez EP) =

EP by Jessica Sanchez
- Released: July 3, 2012
- Recorded: 2012
- Genre: Pop
- Length: 18:30
- Label: 19

Jessica Sanchez chronology
American Idol Season 11 Highlights (2012)	Me, You & the Music (2013)

American Idol Season 11 Highlights is a compilation extended play by Jessica Sanchez based on some of her American Idol performances. The EP was released exclusively through Walmart and consists of a few studio recordings made by Sanchez during season 11 of American Idol. It includes a duet with Joshua Ledet, her potential coronation song, "Change Nothing" and performances that were well received by the judges on the show. Similar EPs were also released through Walmart by fellow contestants from the Top 5, Phillip Phillips, Joshua Ledet, Hollie Cavanagh and Skylar Laine. As of August 2012, it has sold 15,000 copies.

== Track listing ==
No.	Title	Original artist(s)	Length
1.	"Change Nothing"	Jessica Sanchez	3:55
2.	"I Will Always Love You"	Dolly Parton	4:20
3.	"Sweet Dreams"	Beyoncé	4:19
4.	"Stuttering"	Jazmine Sullivan	3:17
5.	"I Knew You Were Waiting (For Me)" (featuring Joshua Ledet)	Aretha Franklin & George Michael	2:40

== Charts ==
Chart (2012)	Peak position
U.S. Billboard 200	77
