= Tonight (Jessica Sanchez song) =

Single by Jessica Sanchez featuring Ne-Yo

from the album Me, You & the Music
- Released: March 22, 2013
- Recorded: 2012
- Genre: Dance-pop
- Length: 3:58
- Label: 19; Interscope
- Songwriter(s): Shaffer Smith; Mikkel S. Eriksen; Tor E. Hermansen
- Producer(s): StarGate

Jessica Sanchez singles chronology
"Change Nothing" (2012)	"Tonight" (2013)	"Lead Me Home" (2013)

Ne-Yo singles chronology
"Play Hard" (2013)	"Tonight" (2013)	"Incredible" (2013)

Music video
- "Tonight" on YouTube

"Tonight" is a single by American recording artist Jessica Sanchez featuring Ne-Yo, taken from Sanchez's debut studio album Me, You & the Music. It was written by Ne-Yo, Mikkel S. Eriksen and Tor E. Hermansen and was produced by StarGate. "Tonight" was released to digital retailer on March 22, 2013, following her debut live performance of the single on the Top 9 results show on the twelfth season of American Idol on March 21, 2013, as the lead single from Me, You & the Music. The song's accompanying music video was shot in downtown Los Angeles on March 1, 2013 with director Justin Francis and made its world premiere on Vevo on March 21, 2013.

== Background ==
Following the series finale of the eleventh season of American Idol Sanchez was signed to Interscope Records/19 Entertainment to begin work on her debut studio album. Recording for the album began during the American Idols Live Tour in mid July 2012, she worked with producers Mark J. Feist, Harvey Mason, Jr. and Toby Gad among others for the album and is set to feature ballads but will exhibit "more of an R&B/Pop/Urban kind of feel". In an interview with MTV News, Sanchez spoke of the song, saying:

" 'Tonight' is a song about people that are usually stressed out, everybody has problems and everything, and 'Tonight' is a song about going out that night and having the best night of your life."

== Critical reception ==
Grady Smith of Entertainment Weekly said that "The song is far better than Jessica's non-starter pop singles 'Change Nothing,' which she performed at last year's finale, and 'Fairytale,' which she debuted at a showcase last year. And it's light years ahead of the generic dance tracks released by The Voice's Jermaine Paul and The X-Factor's Melanie Amaro. 'Tonight' actually sounds like it could fit right in on pop radio or blaring out of the speakers in a club. Here's the thing, though. I'm just not buying it — and that's because I still remember the Jessica Sanchez I got to know on Idol."

== Music video ==
Filming for the music video began on March 1, 2013 in downtown Los Angeles with director Justin Francis. The video premiered on Vevo on March 21, 2013.

== Live performances ==
Sanchez made her TV debut performance of "Tonight" with Ne-Yo on the Top 9 results show on the twelfth season of American Idol on March 21, 2013. On March 22, 2013, just after the performance she made on Idol, she gave her first online performance and an acoustic version. Sanchez later performed "Tonight" for both Young Hollywood and CleverTV.

== Chart performance ==
"Tonight" debuted with 14,000 digital copies sold within the first week of its release. The single has sold 39,000 copies as of May 2013 and 85,000 copies by the end of 2013.

Chart (2013)	Peak position
Australia (ARIA)	42
South Korea (Gaon)	13
US Pop Digital Songs (Billboard)	48

== Release history ==
Country	Date	Format	Label
United States	March 22, 2013	Digital Download	19 Entertainment, Interscope Records
United States	May 7, 2013	Mainstream Top 40	19 Entertainment, Interscope Records
Australia	March 29, 2013	Digital Download	19 Entertainment, Interscope Records
New Zealand	March 29, 2013	Digital Download	19 Entertainment, Interscope Records
Philippines	March 29, 2013	Digital Download	19 Entertainment, Interscope Records
Singapore	March 29, 2013	Digital Download	19 Entertainment, Interscope Records
Thailand	March 29, 2013	Digital Download	19 Entertainment, Interscope Records
