= Anything's Possible =

Public artwork in Santa Clara, California, USA

Coordinates: 37.4044°N 121.9714°W

- Artist: Linda Serrao
- Year: 2016
- Type: Bronze Sculpture
- Dimensions: 2.1 and 1.5 m (7 and 5 ft)
- Location: by Levi's Stadium, Santa Clara, California

Anything's Possible is a public artwork by artist Linda Serrao, located by Levi's Stadium in Santa Clara, CA, United States. Anything's Possible is an installation of two over-lifesize bronze figures, commissioned by the City of Santa Clara. The installation depicts a 7' Quarterback preparing to pass the football to a young fan.

== Information ==
=== Acquisition ===
The work was commissioned and installed in celebration of Super Bowl 50 which was held at Levi's Stadium in Santa Clara in 2016. The design was created in response to the City motto, "The Center of What's Possible," and represents the dream of fans to play with the stars.

=== Location history ===
The pair of figures is located at 2525 Tasman Drive, Santa Clara, CA 25054, on the plaza opposite the entrance to Levi's Stadium.

== Artist ==
Linda Serrao is a California artist working in bronze sculpture. She is a member of the National Sculpture Society. Her emphasis is on realistic figurative works which can be readily appreciated by the viewer.

== See also ==
- Public Art
- Sculpture
