= Tout est possible! =

1974 book by Jean Rabaut

- Author: Jean Rabaut
- Subject: French history, history of labor
- Publisher: Denoël–Gonthier
- Publication date: 1974
- Pages: 415

Tout est possible! Les gauchistes français 1929–1944 is a 1974 history book of French leftism by Jean Rabaut.

== Bibliography ==
- Lévy, Claude (1976). "Sur les marginaux de l'extrême-gauche (1929-1944)". Revue d'histoire de la Deuxième Guerre mondiale. 26 (104): 112–114. ISSN 0035-2314. JSTOR 25728803.
- Racine-Furlaud, Nicole (1975). "Review of Tout est possible ! Les « gauchistes » français 1929-1944. (Collection grand format Médiaitions)". Revue française de science politique. 25 (5): 972–973. ISSN 0035-2950. JSTOR 43115880.
- Rioux, Jean-Pierre (1975). "Review of Tout est possible! Les « gauchistes » français, 1929-1944". Esprit (1940-) (448 (7/8)): 149–150. ISSN 0014-0759. JSTOR 24264756.
- Vidalenc, Jean (1976). "Review of Tout est possible. Les « gauchistes » français 1929-1944". Revue d'histoire économique et sociale. 54 (3): 435–436. ISSN 0035-239X. JSTOR 24079094.
