= Change Nothing (song) =

2012 single by Jessica Sanchez

Single by Jessica Sanchez
- Released: May 23, 2012
- Recorded: 2012
- Genre: Pop
- Length: 3:55
- Label: 19 Recordings
- Songwriter(s): Joleen Belle, Jaden Michaels and Harry Sommerdahl

Jessica Sanchez singles chronology
"Change Nothing" (2012)	"Tonight" (2013)

"Change Nothing" is the debut single of American recording artist and American Idol season 11 runner-up, Jessica Sanchez. The song was written by Jaden Michaels, Joleen Belle and Harry Sommerdahl. Sanchez first performed the song, her potential coronation song had she won the title, on May 22, 2012 American Idol final performance show. After the final performance show, her recording of "Change Nothing" was released as a single on May 23, 2012.

== Critical reception ==
Andrew Unterberger of PopDust.com gave the song a rating of 2.5 saying, "You can pretty much guess most of it from the title—I love you, you're imperfect, don't change—but there's a little complexity to it lyrically, it'd probably sound great at the end of Con Air or Armageddon, and considering the low bar of Idol originals, it could be worse, probably." Unterberger criticized the judges' comments regarding the wrong song choice. He said, "Oddly, after the performance is over, each of the three judges take Jessica to task for the song itself, saying they were hoping for something more 'urban.' Um, were they watching the first two performances? Have they heard an Idol original song before? Did they think she was gonna come out in Beyoncé spandex and burst into 'Single Ladies'? Whatever, guys."

== Track listing ==
Digital download
No.	Title	Length
1.	"Change Nothing" (American Idol Performance)	3:55

== Release history ==
Country	Date	Format	Label
United States	May 23, 2012	Digital download	19 Recordings, Inc
