= Justin Francis (director) =

American cinematographer and director

Justin Francis is a Los Angeles-based film director, cinematographer and photographer. He has a long track record of executing big visions for the world's most successful artists, brands and record labels.

== Biography ==
Justin got his start shooting fashion films in New York City alongside legendary photographers such as Richard Avedon and Platon. He went on to apprentice Matthew Libatique behind the camera on Darren Aronofsky's Requiem for a Dream.

In the years since, Francis has traveled the world shooting spots, music videos and live performances, accumulating billions of views in the process. He has photographed #1 album covers for platinum-selling recording artists, including J. Cole's 2021 release The Off-Season.

Francis also has roots in the unscripted world dating back to his NYU graduate student project Footwork featuring Bobbito Garcia. He was the cinematographer on Anything Is Possible, a feature documentary for Showtime Basketball on Kevin Garnett. He was the Director of Photography on Season One of the Hulu series It's All Country.

Whether photographing top tier talent or pursuing documentary projects, Justin continually seeks to inspire and innovate in every aspect of his work.

== Partial list of music video credits ==
Francis has directed music videos for Alicia Keys, Skip Marley, Jidenna, Carly Rae Jepsen, Camila Cabello, Santana, Weezer, Wyclef, Kimbra, Pia Mia, The Fray, Nicole Scherzinger, Modest Mouse, Young the Giant, Demi Lovato, The Hives, Amos Lee, Timbaland, Mariah Carey, Bonnie McKee, Kelly Clarkson, Shawn Mendes, Lil Wayne, Trey Songz, Obie Trice, B.o.B and Busta Rhymes (co-directed with Benny Boom).

As part of The Saline Project, Francis also co-directed videos for The Cure, The Hives, Keane, Eminem, 50 Cent, Gwen Stefani, The Black Eyed Peas, The Roots, Mobb Deep, Daddy Yankee, Young Buck, The Mars Volta, Damien Marley and Nappy Roots.

As a director of photography Francis has DP'd projects featuring Pharrell, Kendrick Lamar, SZA, Nas, CL, Camila Cabello, OneRepublic, DJ Premier, Lizzo, Ciara, Jonas Blue, Kane Brown, Marshmello, Bebe Rexha, Tinashe, Why Don't We, Ella Mai, Bryce Vine, Conrad Sewell, West Life, Linkin Park, Sierra Ferrell, Mickey Guyton, Julie Williams, Wynonna Judd and Benjamin Tod.

== Partial list of commercial credits ==
Francis has directed projects for Uniqlo, Tumi, Meta, Snap, Sprint, Genesis, Target, Toyota, Tiffany & Co., Adidas, Puma, Smart Water, Gillette, NY Knicks, The General, City National Bank, Black Water, Talbots, Eileen Fisher, Kenneth Cole Productions and DP'd spots for Bacardi, Corona, NFL, Mastercard, New Balance, Sony, McDonald's, Disney, Burger King, Ritual Vitamins, Moroccanoil, Psycho Bunny, M&M's, Johnny Walker, Pepsi, Subway, Mountain Dew and Microsoft.

== Awards ==
Francis's work with Alicia Keys on "Unbreakable" won "Outstanding Video" at the 37th NAACP Image Awards. His video for the Alicia Keys song "No One" was awarded "Best R&B Video" at the 2008 MVPA Awards.

== Memberships ==
- International Cinematographers Guild
- Directors Guild of America
