= Ken Lim =

Singaporean musician and event promoter

- Born: Singapore
- Occupations: Composer, music producer, publisher, artiste manager, concert promoter, campaign management and concepts development.
- Years active: 1977–present

Chinese name
- Traditional Chinese: 林智強
- Simplified Chinese: 林智强
Transcriptions
Standard Mandarin
- Hanyu Pinyin: Lín Zhìqiáng

Ken Lim Chih Chiang (born 1964) is a Singaporean concept & campaign manager, concerts & event promoter, artist manager, composer, music producer & publisher. He was the executive director of Hype Records. He was convicted of molestation in 2025 by a Singapore court.

== Early life and career ==
Lim has represented Singapore in numerous song festivals and competitions since he was 16. Amongst them are, Asia Song Contest, Seoul Song Festival, World Popular Song Festival and Popular Song Festival.

In 1978, Ken Lim was employed as an engineer and record producer at EMI Recording Studios at the age of 14, while still attending school.

In 1984, Lim submitted his composition 'I Live in the past' to the 7th Seoul Song Festival and was selected as the final 13 songs. Together with Reggie Verghese and three other partners, Lim formed Boogie Productions Pte Ltd and took over the recording studio and equipment from EMI Singapore Pte Ltd which had closed down.

In 1992, Lim set up Hype Records, a Singaporean record company, and served as its executive director.

In 1993, Lim co-wrote the song, 'Bring Out the Love', the official song for the 1993 SEA Games held in Singapore.

In 1994, Lim released his first album Empyrean, meaning highest heaven, an instrumental and ballads album with guest singers such as Farid Ali, Harvey Malihollo and Connie Amon. The album was commissioned by a Taiwanese record label who was looking for a producer album.

In 1999, Lim was commissioned to write a Singapore National Day parade song which he wrote 'Together', a duet which was performed by Dreamz FM and Evelyn Tan. He also composed 'Moments of Magic', the theme song of Singapore's millennium celebrations.

In May 2000, the Ministry of Information and the Arts of Singapore, invited local composers were invited to rearrange the national anthem, Majulah Singapura, in F major. After selecting the version submitted by Cultural Medallion winner Phoon Yew Tien, MITA then commissioned Lim to produce a recording by the Singapore Symphony Orchestra conducted by Lim Yau, which was carried out at the Victoria Concert Hall on 20 November 2000.

In 2004, Lim became one of the judges for Singapore Idol, the first Asian show of the Idol franchise. He drew substantial attention due to his remarks and deadpan expressions, known to be brutally honest and direct with his comments. He would also later be the judge for all three seasons of Singapore Idol (2006 and 2009). For the third season, Lim wrote a song "Touched by an Angel" to be sung by the finalists in the final show and to be recorded by the winner.

In 2005, Lim produced another Singapore National Day parade song, 'Reach Out for the Skies', which was performed by Taufik Batisah and Rui En.

In 2007, Lim was also one of the judges for Asian Idol. He was also the judge for Mediacorp's reality show "Live The Dream".

In 2010, Lim wrote and produced the official theme song, Everyone, of the 2010 Summer Youth Olympics held in Singapore from 14 to 26 August 2010.

In 2013, Lim said he wanted to produce new local talent and make them to be celebrities. He then created a Singaporean reality-singing competition programme, The Final 1 in 2013. He was also one of the three judges for the show. The programme went on for a second season in 2015 with Lim as a judge again.

== Awards ==
- 'The Most Outstanding Composition Award' at the Asia Popular Song Festival in 1981

== Personal life ==
Lim is married to Judy Hsu, a Taiwanese Canadian and Singaporean PR who was a former singer and current CEO of the Consumer, Private and Business Banking (CPBB) at Standard Chartered Bank. They met while she was a recording artist and known as Hsu Zhong Wei (徐仲薇) more than 37 years ago. They have two sons.

In March 2023, Lim was charged for molestation which happened in 2021 at his Hype Records office. He was later charged in June for insulting the modesty of 3 other women over the time period of 1998 and 2013. In September, Lim received an additional charge for insulting another woman's modesty in 2012, resulting in him having a total of seven charges across five victims.Lim was convicted of molestation in November 2025 and was sentenced to 13 months' jail.
