= Jessica Sanchez =

American singer-songwriter (born 1995)

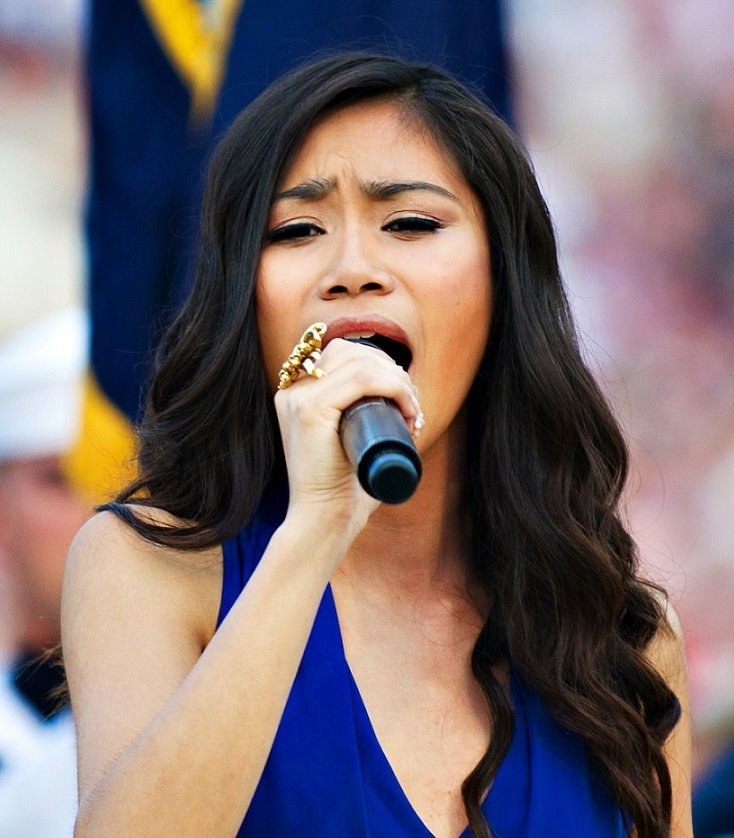
- Sanchez performing the national anthem during a Memorial Day concert at the National Mall in Washington, D.C., on May 27, 2012

Background information
- Born: Jessica Elizabeth Sanchez; August 4, 1995 (age 31); Chula Vista, California, U.S.
- Origin: San Diego, California, U.S.
- Genres: R&B; pop; soul
- Occupations: Singer; songwriter
- Instrument: Vocals
- Years active: 2006–present
- Labels: 19; Interscope; Republic
- Spouse: Rickie Gallardo (m. 2021)
- Website: www.jessicasanchezofficial.com

Jessica Elizabeth Sanchez (born August 4, 1995) is an American singer-songwriter. She rose to prominence following her runner-up finish on the eleventh season of American Idol. Her debut studio album, Me, You & the Music, peaked at number twenty-six on the US Billboard 200. In 2025, having been ousted in the semifinals of the first season, Sanchez returned nineteen years later for the twentieth season of America's Got Talent and was announced the winner on September 24, 2025.

== Early life ==
Jessica Elizabeth Sanchez was born in Chula Vista, California, on August 4, 1995. She is the daughter of Edita Sanchez (née Bugay), whose family is from Samal, Bataan, in the Philippines; and Gilbert Sanchez, a Mexican American from Texas who served as an aviation ordnanceman (Petty Officer First Class) in the United States Navy Reserve. She is the eldest of three children, with two younger brothers. Sanchez was raised in the neighborhood of Eastlake in Chula Vista. She attended Eastlake Middle School.

== Career ==
=== 2006–2011: Career beginnings ===
In 2005, Sanchez performed "Respect" by Aretha Franklin on the music television show Showtime at the Apollo. A year later, she competed on the first season of NBC's talent show competition America's Got Talent, in which she became a wildcard act, but ultimately did not qualify for the grand finals. During the 2008 NFL season, Sanchez performed "The Star-Spangled Banner" prior to the San Diego Chargers' game against the New York Jets. In 2009, she recorded a cover "Don't Stop the Music" by Rihanna for iTunes with independent record label Spin Move Records. Sanchez collaborated with the label once again in 2010 for a cover of "I'd Rather Go Blind" by Etta James for YouTube and was released as an exclusive download on the label's website. Earlier same year, she collaborated with Brandon Kane for the single "Just You and Me". Additionally, she was among the fifty-seven singers who contributed in a YouTube edition of the charity single "We Are the World 25 for Haiti", which was produced by Lisa Lavie.

=== 2012: American Idol ===
On July 8, 2011, Sanchez auditioned for the eleventh season of American Idol in San Diego, California. She progressed through subsequent rounds prior to being eliminated in the twenty-eighth episode on April 12, 2012, which the judges overturned by drawing the "Judges' Save" for her to remain in the competition. Sanchez ultimately finished as the runner-up in the grand finals behind Phillip Phillips on May 23, 2012. She subsequently performed three songs ("The Star-Spangled Banner," "God Bless America", and "The Prayer") at the PBS' National Memorial Day Concert from the west lawn of the United States Capitol in Washington, D.C., on May 27, 2012. On June 29, 2012, it was announced that Sanchez signed a record deal with Interscope Records. She later performed "You're All I Need to Get By" by Marvin Gaye and Tammi Terrell, where she was accompanied by God's Appointed People Choir at the 2012 Democratic National Convention in Charlotte, North Carolina on September 6, 2012. Furthermore, the performance was succeeded by four events towards the end of the year: the City of Hope Spirit of Life Awards Gala on October 10, 2012, the 26th Annual Carousel Ball of Hope on October 23, 2012, the 2012 Brittania Awards on November 7, 2012, and Trevor Live on December 2, 2012.

==== Performances and results ====
Episode	Theme	Song choice	Original artist	Order	Result
Audition	Auditioner's Choice	"(You Make Me Feel Like) A Natural Woman"	Aretha Franklin	—N/a	Advanced
Hollywood Round, Part 1	First Solo	"Get Me Bodied"	Beyoncé	—N/a	Advanced
Hollywood Round, Part 2	Group Performance	Unaired		—N/a	Advanced
Hollywood Round, Part 3	Second Solo	Unaired		—N/a	Advanced
Las Vegas Round	Songs from the 1950s	"It Doesn't Matter Anymore" (with DeAndre Brackensick and Candice Glover)	Buddy Holly	—N/a	Advanced
Final Judgment	Final Solo	"The Prayer"	Celine Dion and Andrea Bocelli	—N/a	Advanced
Top 25 (12 Women)	Personal Choice	"Love You I Do"	Jennifer Hudson	11	Advanced
Top 13	Whitney Houston	"I Will Always Love You"	Dolly Parton	12	Safe
Top 11	Year They Were Born	"Turn the Beat Around"	Vicki Sue Robinson	2	Safe
Top 10	Billy Joel	"Everybody Has a Dream"	Billy Joel	9	Safe
Top 9	Their Personal Idols	"Sweet Dreams"	Beyoncé	7	Safe
Top 9	Their Personal Idols	"Like a Prayer", "Borderline", and "Express Yourself" (with Hollie Cavanagh and Skylar Laine)	Madonna	11	Safe
Top 8	Songs from the 1980s	Solo "How Will I Know"	Whitney Houston	7	Safe
Top 8	Songs from the 1980s	"I Knew You Were Waiting (For Me)" (with Joshua Ledet)	Aretha Franklin and George Michael	10	Safe
Top 7 (Note: Due to the judges applying the "Judges' Save" on Sanchez, the top 7 remained intact for another week.)	Songs from the 2010s	"Stuttering"	Jazmine Sullivan	3	Saved (Note: Sanchez received the fewest votes; however, the judges applied the "Judges' Save" on her for her to remain in the competition.)
Top 7	Songs from the 2010s	"Stronger (What Doesn't Kill You)" (with Joshua Ledet and Hollie Cavanagh)	Kelly Clarkson	9	Saved
Top 7	Songs from Now & Then	"Fallin'"	Alicia Keys	5	Safe
Top 7	Songs from Now & Then	"Try a Little Tenderness"	Ray Noble Orchestra	12	Safe
Top 6	Queen	"Bohemian Rhapsody"	Queen	1	Safe
Top 6	Contestant's Choice	"Dance with My Father"	Luther Vandross	7	Safe
Top 5	Songs from the 1960s	"Proud Mary"	Creedence Clearwater Revival	5	Safe
Top 5	Songs from the 1960s	"(Your Love Keeps Lifting Me) Higher and Higher" (with Hollie Cavanagh and Skylar Laine)	Jackie Wilson	9	Safe
Top 5	British Pop	"You Are So Beautiful"	Billy Preston	11	Safe
Top 4	California Dreamin'	"Steal Away"	Jimmy Hughes	4	Safe
Top 4	California Dreamin'	"Eternal Flame" (with Hollie Cavanagh)	The Bangles	6	Safe
Top 4	California Dreamin'	"Waiting for a Girl Like You" (with Hollie Cavanagh, Joshua Ledet, and Phillip Phillips)	Foreigner	7	Safe
Top 4	Songs They Wish They'd Written	"And I Am Telling You I'm Not Going"	Jennifer Holliday	11	Safe
Top 3	Judges' Choice	"My All"	Mariah Carey	2	Safe
Top 3	Contestant's Choice	"I Don't Want to Miss a Thing"	Aerosmith	5	Safe
Top 3	Jimmy Iovine's Choice	"I'll Be There"	The Jackson 5	8	Safe
Finale	Simon Fuller's Choice	"I Have Nothing"	Whitney Houston	1	Runner-up
Finale	Favorite Performance	"The Prayer"	Celine Dion and Andrea Bocelli	3	Runner-up
Finale	Winner's Single	"Change Nothing"	Jessica Sanchez	5	Runner-up

=== 2013: Me, You & the Music ===
Sanchez performing "God Bless America" by Irving Berlin during a Memorial Day concert on the west lawn of the United States Capitol in Washington, D.C. on May 26, 2013.

"Tonight", the lead single from Sanchez's debut studio album, was released on March 22, 2013. The song featured vocals from Ne-Yo. The duo previously performed "Tonight" on the twenty-first episode of the twelfth season of American Idol March 21, 2013. The song enjoyed minor domestic commercial success, where it debuted and peaked at number 48 on the Digital Songs chart. Elsewhere, "Tonight" debuted and peaked at number 42 on the ARIA Top 100 Singles Chart in Australia. On April 1, 2013, she performed "The Star-Spangled Banner" for then United States president Barack Obama and his family at the White House for the Easter Egg Roll. Sanchez released her debut album Me, You & the Music on April 30, 2013. The album underperformed, debuting and peaked at number 26 on the Billboard 200 chart and sold 14,000 copies in its first week. Due to Me, You & the Music's aforementioned results, Sanchez quietly parted with Interscope Records.

Approximately a year since the announcement of her casting on Fox's comedy drama television series Glee, she ultimately made her first appearance on the series as a guest star in the episode "Lights Out", which premiered on April 25, 2013. Sanchez portrayed the role of Frida Romero, a student from a rival school. She reprised the role in the episode "All or Nothing", which premiered on May 9, 2013, during which she performed "Clarity" by Zedd and Foxes and "Wings" by Little Mix as a part of The Hoosierdaddies. Sanchez performed "Feel This Moment" by Pitbull and Christina Aguilera during the grand finals of the sixteenth season of ABC's dance competition Dancing with the Stars on May 21, 2013. She performed "God Bless America" in a Memorial Day concert at the United States Capitol on May 26, 2013.

Sanchez performed "The Star-Spangled Banner" and "Lupang Hinirang" at the Manny Pacquiao vs. Brandon Ríos match in The Venetian, Macau on November 23, 2013. She subsequently contributed two tracks for the Heartbeat of Home original soundtrack: "Lead Me Home", which was released as a single with an accompanying music video on November 27, 2013, and "The Night I Dance with You", which was a duet with Jencarlos Canela.

=== 2014–2018: Stand-alone singles and Christmas with Jessica ===
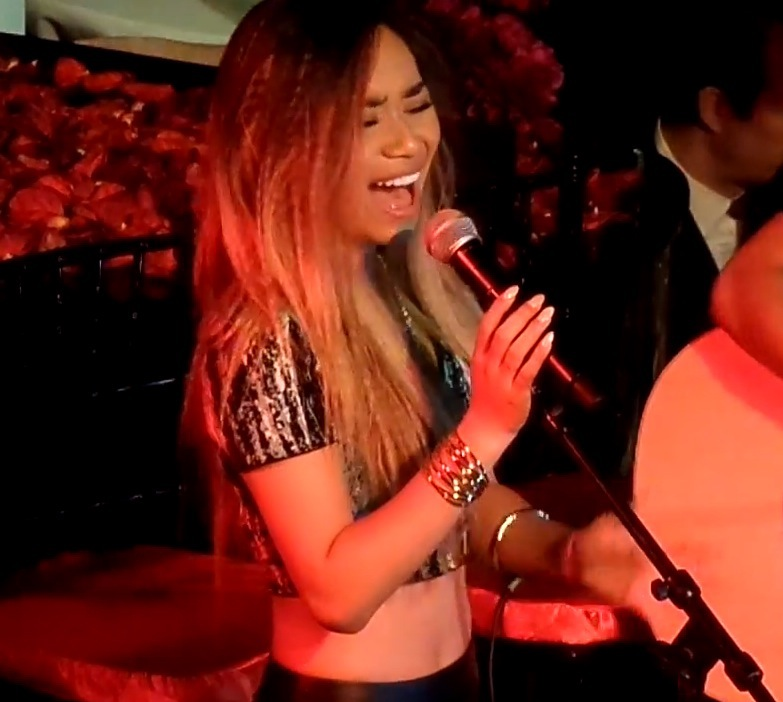
Sanchez performing "Pour It Up" by Rihanna during Crustacean's Red Hour Jam Session in Beverly Hills, California on June 25, 2014.

Accompanied by Jake Zyrus and Jennifer Hudson among others, Sanchez performed "Let It Go" by Idina Menzel at the Pinoy Relief Benefit Concert on March 11, 2014, where all the proceeds of the concert would be donated to Filipino citizens that has been affected by Typhoon Haiyan. With judge Jennifer Lopez, season 8 alumni Allison Iraheta, and season 10 alumni Pia Toscano, she performed "I Luh Ya Papi" on the twenty-first episode of the thirteenth season of American Idol on March 20, 2014. The group reunited for Crustacean's Red Hour Jam Session in Beverly Hills, California on June 25, 2014, during which Sanchez performed "Pour It Up" by Rihanna. Sanchez featured on "Vacation" by DJ Komori, which was released on October 6, 2014, in conjunction of its lyric video.

"This Love", a single teased during an interview with the online magazine She Knows on December 22, 2014, was released on January 7, 2015 with an accompanying music video, which was directed by Gabriel Valenciano. Sanchez headlined a concert billed as "Jessica Sanchez: Up Close and Personal Live in Manila" at the City of Dreams, Pasay on August 9, 2015. She performed two songs with the finalists ("Dance with My Father" by Luther Vandross with Charlene Su and ''Clarity" by Zedd and Foxes with Jermaine Leong) of the second season of MediaCorp Channel 5's singing competition The Final 1 on August 21, 2013. Sanchez collaborated with Christian Bautista for the song "Two Forevers", which was released on November 5, 2015, in conjunction of its music video, from his studio album Kapit. Sanchez released the Christmas extended play Christmas with Jessica on December 8, 2015. The record was composed of covers of famed Christmas songs including "Santa Baby" by Eartha Kitt and was recorded within two days.

She frequently collaborated with Leroy Sanchez in 2016, where the duo released a duet of "1+1" by Beyoncé on January 27, 2016, and of Justin Bieber and Halsey's "The Feeling" on March 30, 2016. Sanchez subsequently returned to American Idol for the grand finals of the fifteenth season on April 7, 2016, during which she performed "The Prayer" by Celine Dion and Andrea Bocelli. Her performance was lauded by the audience. Sanchez released the single "Call Me" on May 10, 2016. She performed the song during the Tubathon 2016 in Burbank, California on April 20, 2016. Sanchez released the single "Stronger Together" for the 2016 Democratic National Convention on July 26, 2016. The song was played following Hillary Clinton's acceptance speech at the convention. "Stronger Together" debuted and peaked at number four on the Dance Club Songs chart, becoming her first charting single since "Tonight". The song was remixed by Tracy Young and re-released on November 2, 2016, with an accompanying music video.

Sanchez appeared as a featured artist on "Beauty and the Beast" by Matt Bloyd from his extended play Covers, Vol. 2, which was released on July 20, 2017. She performed "The Star-Spangled Banner" prior to Los Angeles Chargers' match against the Oakland Raiders on October 15, 2017. Following her performance, Sanchez knelt in support of the U.S. national anthem protests.

She collaborated with Ricky Breaker for "Caught Up", which was released on April 22, 2018, in conjunction with its music video, and became her first single since "Stronger Together", which was released two years prior. Sanchez performed the song during the June 3, 2018 broadcast of ABS-CBN's musical variety show ASAP, and again inside of the Wish Bus on June 7, 2018. She subsequently reunited with Jake Zyrus for his concert billed as "Music & Me" as a musical guest on May 25, 2018, at the Sky Dome in Quezon City, Metro Manila. "Millionaire" was released on June 1, 2018. Sanchez performed at the Filipino Community of Guam’s 64th Anniversary ball at the Dusit Thani Guam Resort in Tumon on October 19, 2018. It was announced that she would be reuniting with Christian Bautista for the Christmas single "Another Silent Christmas song" on October 23, 2018. The single was subsequently released on November 2, 2018, with a music video premiering on November 16, 2018. Sanchez co-headlined a concert with Martin Nievera at Solaire Resort & Casino in Entertainment City, Bay City on November 10, 2018. The concert was her second at the resort and casino since 2014 for the first anniversary of its grand opening.

=== 2019–2024: "Love You", "Angels", "Us", and "Baddie" ===
Sanchez performed for the House of Bolkiah during the Crown Prince Haji Al-Muhtadee Billah's birthday celebration on February 18, 2019. Under the mononym Jes, she released a single titled "Love You" on April 22, 2019. In an interview with The Philippine Star on May 15, 2019, Sanchez revealed that she would be releasing her third extended play within 2019. As of 2022, it has yet to be released. She subsequently reunited with Leroy Sanchez for a duet of "A Whole New World", which was released on May 24, 2019, with an accompanying music video. Sanchez released the single "Angels" on June 21, 2019. She reunited with Matt Bloyd for a duet of "Can You Feel the Love Tonight" from his extended play King, which was released on July 17, 2019. Sanchez performed "And I Am Telling You I'm Not Going" by Jennifer Holliday during the grand finals of the first season of Idol Philippines on July 28, 2019. She became an ambassador of Frontrow on July 29, 2019, and performed at its Thanksgiving event, Frontrow All In, on November 9, 2019. Sanchez held concerts, which were billed as In the Spotlight: Jessica Sanchez, on November 22 and 29, 2019, during which she was accompanied by Lance Busa and Lucas Garcia. Sanchez collaborated again with Bautista, who was one of the judges of the second season of GMA Network's reality talent competition show The Clash, on December 6, 2019, to reprise their Christmas single "Another Silent Christmas Song" prior to performing "All I Want for Christmas is You" by Mariah Carey with the seven remaining contestants.

On May 8, 2021, she released a single titled "Us" as a response to the xenophobia and racism related to the COVID-19 pandemic. Its music video premiered on the same day and featured guest appearances from Apl.de.ap and Mark Cuban. On August 12, 2022, Sanchez released the single "Baddie", a self-written song about women's empowerment.

=== 2025: Winning America's Got Talent season 20 ===
In 2025, Sanchez auditioned for the twentieth season of America's Got Talent. In the auditions round, she received a golden buzzer from judge Sofía Vergara, sending her directly to the live shows. Sanchez advanced to the finale where she won the show on September 24, becoming the first former contestant to win in the show's history, the first solo female winner since Darci Lynne in 2017, and the fourth female singing contestant to win the competition. At 30 years old, Sanchez became the oldest female winner in the show's history.

==== Performances and results ====
Week	Song choice	Original artist	Result
Audition	"Beautiful Things"	Benson Boone	Golden Buzzer from judge Sofía Vergara
Quarterfinals	"Ordinary"	Alex Warren	Advanced
Semifinals	"Golden Hour"	JVKE	Advanced
Finals	"Die With A Smile"	Lady Gaga, Bruno Mars	N/A
Finale	"Golden Hour" with Talent Sirca Marea	JVKE	Winner

== Personal life ==
On July 15, 2025, during her return to America's Got Talent, Sanchez revealed that she had married and was pregnant with her first child. She married Rickie Gallardo in 2021, and gave birth to their daughter, Eliana Mae Gallardo, on October 13, 2025.

== Discography ==
=== Studio albums ===
- Me, You & the Music (2013)

=== Independent albums ===
- Szn (2026)

== Filmography ==
=== Television ===
Year	Title	Role	Notes
2006; 2025	America's Got Talent	Contestant	Semi-finalist (season 1), Winner (season 20)
2012–2014; 2016	American Idol	Various	Runner-Up (season 11); Guest performer (season 12–13; 15)
2013	Glee	Frida Romero	2 episodes
2026–present	ASAP XP	Herself	Recurring guest performer

== Tours ==
=== Joint tours ===
- American Idols Live! Tour 2012 (with American Idol season 11 finalists) (2012)
