= David Archuleta discography =

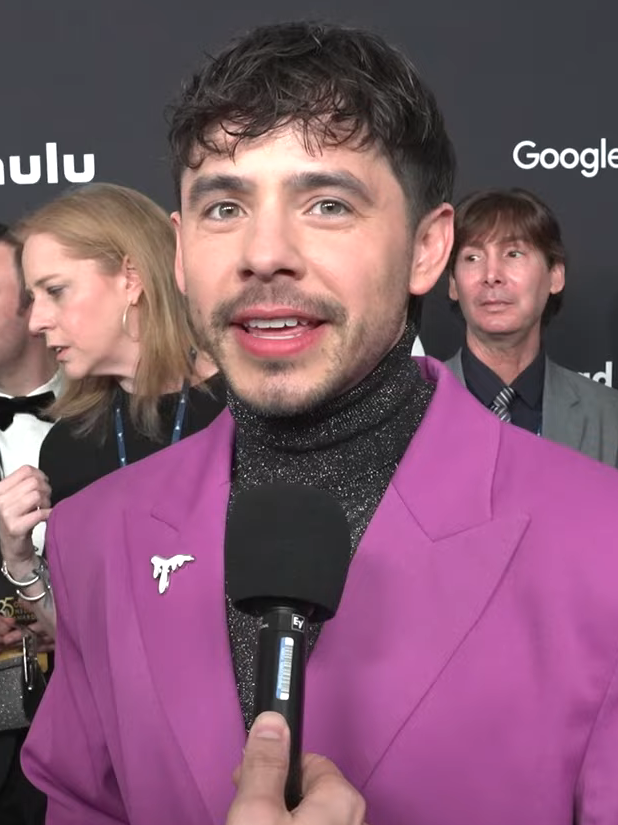
- Archuleta in 2024.
- Studio albums: 9
- Extended plays: 7
- Singles: 38
- Video albums: 1
- Music videos: 30

American singer David Archuleta has released nine studio albums, seven extended plays, 38 singles, and 30 music videos. In 2008, Archuleta released his self-titled album under Jive Records, which debuted at number two on the Billboard 200 chart and was certified Gold by the Recording Industry Association of America (RIAA) with 760,000 copies sold in United States as of January 2011. His debut single "Crush" was released on August 1, 2008, and debuted at number two on the Billboard Hot 100. In 2009, Archuleta released his second studio album and first Christmas album Christmas from the Heart under Jive Records, with sales of 246,000 in the United States. The album reached number thirty on the US Billboard 200 and number two on the US Holiday Albums chart.

In 2010, Archuleta released his third studio album The Other Side of Down under Jive Records and promoted it on The Other Side of Down Asian Tour that started in July 2011. The album reached number thirteen on the US Billboard 200. The Other Side of Down managed only 60,000 copies sold, which led him to be dropped by Jive Records in 2011 after three years with the label. In 2012, Archuleta left the recording business for a two-year mission for the Church of Jesus Christ of Latter-day Saints in Chile. Earlier that year, Archuleta signed with Philippines network TV5 for a mini-series, Nandito Ako and released his fourth studio album Forevermore. Archuleta released his fifth studio album Begin on August 7, 2012. Following his mission Archuleta released several singles and collaborations, but he made his official comeback to music in 2017 with the EPs Orion and Leo, released on May 19 and August 25, 2017, respectively. His sixth studio album Postcards in the Sky was released on October 20, 2017, and he followed that up in 2020 with his most recent album, Therapy Sessions.

== Albums ==
=== Studio albums ===
| Title | Details | Peak chart positions | | | | | Sales | Certifications (sales threshold) |
| Title | Details | US | US Holiday | US Christ | CAN | JPN | Sales | Certifications (sales threshold) |
|---|---|---|---|---|---|---|---|---|
| David Archuleta | Released: November 11, 2008; Label: Jive/Zomba; Format: CD, Digital download | 2 | — | — | 14 | 105 | US: 765,000; Worldwide: 900,000 | RIAA: Gold |
| Christmas from the Heart | Released: October 13, 2009; Label: Jive/Zomba; Format: CD, Digital download | 30 | 2 | — | 96 | — | US: 250,000 | |
| The Other Side of Down | Released: October 5, 2010; Label: Jive/Zomba; Format: CD, Digital download | 13 | — | — | 68 | — | US: 67,000 | |
| Forevermore | Released: March 26, 2012 (Philippines); Label: Ivory Records; Format: CD, digital download | — | — | — | — | — | | PARI: Gold |
| Begin | Released: August 7, 2012; Label: Highway Records; Format: CD, digital download | 28 | — | — | — | — | US: 14,000 | |
| Postcards in the Sky | Released: October 20, 2017; Label: Archie Music, Tone Tree Music; Format: CD, digital download | — | — | — | — | — | | |
| Winter in the Air | Released: November 2, 2018; Label: Archie Music; Format: CD, Digital download | 191 | 6 | 9 | — | — | | |
| Therapy Sessions | Released: May 20, 2020; Label: Archie Music; Format: CD, Digital download | — | — | — | — | — | | |
| Warm Me Up | Released: October 30, 2026; Label: Archie Music; Format: digital download | — | — | — | — | — | | |
"—" denotes a recording that did not chart or was not released in that territory.

=== Compilation albums ===
| Title | Details | Peak chart positions |
| Title | Details | US |
|---|---|---|
| No Matter How Far | Released: March 26, 2013; Label: Entertainment One; Formats: CD, digital download | 110 |

=== Live albums ===
| Title | Details | Peak chart positions | | Sales |
| Title | Details | US | US Holiday | Sales |
|---|---|---|---|---|
| Glad Christmas Tidings (Mormon Tabernacle Choir featuring David Archuleta) | Released: September 6, 2011; Label: Intellectual Reserve; Formats: CD, DVD, Digital download | 179 | 11 | US: 28,000 |

== Extended plays ==
| Title | Details |
|---|---|
| David Archuleta: American Idol | Released: 2009; Format: Digital download |
| AOL Sessions 2008 (Note: David Archuleta's AOL Session recorded in 2008.) | Released: April 24, 2009; Label: Jive/Zomba; Format: Digital download |
| Fan Pack (Note: Original EP with two new songs, only available on iTunes.) | Released: June 9, 2009; Label: Jive/Zomba; Format: Digital download |
| Four for the Fans (Note: Original EP with two bonus tracks from the album David Archuleta and the two tracks from Fan Pack EP, only available on iTunes.) | Released: July 2010; Label: Jive/Zomba; Format: Digital download |
| Orion (Note: Original EP with 4 songs, only available on iTunes.) | Released: May 19, 2017; Label: Archie Music; Format: Digital download |
| Leo (Note: Original EP with 4 songs, only available on iTunes.) | Released: August 25, 2017; Label: Archie Music; Format: Digital download |
| Earthly Delights | Released: August 15, 2025; Label: Archie Music; Format: Digital download, streaming |
| My Only Wish | Released: November 14, 2025; Label: Archie Music; Format: Digital download, streaming |
| Devout | Released: March 27, 2026; Label: Archie Music; Format: Digital download, streaming |

== Singles ==
=== As lead artist ===
| Year | Title | Peak chart positions | | | | | | | | Album |
| Year | Title | US | US Pop | US AC | US Adult | US Christ | CAN | JPN | SWE | Album |
|---|---|---|---|---|---|---|---|---|---|---|
| 2008 | "Crush" | 2 | 13 | 6 | 15 | — | 7 | 89 | 36 | David Archuleta |
| 2009 | "A Little Too Not Over You" | — (Note: "A Little Too Not Over You" did not enter the Billboard Hot 100, but peaked at number 14 on the Bubbling Under Hot 100 Singles chart.) | — | — | — | — | — | — | — | David Archuleta |
| 2009 | "Touch My Hand" | — | — | — | — | — | — | — | — | David Archuleta |
| 2009 | "Have Yourself a Merry Little Christmas" | — | — | 22 | — | — | — | — | — | Christmas from the Heart |
| 2010 | "Something 'Bout Love" | — (Note: "Something 'Bout Love" did not enter the Billboard Hot 100, but peaked at number four on the Bubbling Under Hot 100 Singles chart.) | — | — | — | — | — | — | — | The Other Side of Down |
| 2010 | "Elevator" | — | — | — | — | — | — | — | — | The Other Side of Down |
| 2010 | "Falling Stars" | — | — | — | — | — | — | — | — | The Other Side of Down |
| 2011 | "Wait" | — | — | — | — | — | — | — | — | The Other Side of Down: Asian Tour Edition |
| 2012 | "Forevermore" | — | — | — | — | — | — | — | — | Forevermore |
| 2012 | "I'll Never Go" | — | — | — | — | — | — | — | — | Forevermore |
| 2012 | "Broken" | — | — | — | — | — | — | — | — | Begin |
| 2012 | "Everybody Hurts" | — | — | — | — | — | — | — | — | Begin |
| 2013 | "Rainbow (Remix)" | — | — | — | — | — | — | — | — | Forevermore (Expanded Edition) |
| 2013 | "Don't Run Away" | — | — | — | — | — | — | — | — | No Matter How Far |
| 2014 | "Glorious" | — | — | — | — | — | — | — | — | Winter in the Air |
| 2015 | "The Prayer" (with Nathan Pacheco) | — | — | — | — | — | — | — | — | Non-album single |
| 2016 | "Numb" | — | — | — | — | — | — | — | — | Postcards in the Sky |
| 2016 | "My Little Prayer" | — | — | — | — | 28 | — | — | — | Non-album singles |
| 2016 | "Mi Pequeña Oración (My Little Prayer)" | — | — | — | — | — | — | — | — | Non-album singles |
| 2017 | "Up All Night" | — | — | — | — | — | — | — | — | Postcards in the Sky |
| 2017 | "Invincible" | — | — | — | — | — | — | — | — | Postcards in the Sky |
| 2018 | "Seasons" (featuring Madilyn Paige) | — | — | — | — | — | — | — | — | Postcards in the Sky |
| 2018 | "Christmas Every Day" | — | — | 22 | — | 39 | — | — | — | Winter in the Air |
| 2018 | "Winter in the Air" | — | — | — | — | — | — | — | — | Winter in the Air |
| 2019 | "Postcards in the Sky" | — | — | — | — | — | — | — | — | Postcards in the Sky |
| 2019 | "Paralyzed" | — | — | — | — | — | — | — | — | Therapy Sessions |
| 2019 | "Merry Christmas, Happy Holidays" | — | — | — | — | — | — | — | — | Winter in the Air |
| 2020 | "OK, All Right" | — | — | — | — | — | — | — | — | Therapy Sessions |
| 2021 | "Be That for You" | — | — | — | — | — | — | — | — | Non-album singles |
| 2021 | "Losin' Sleep" | — | — | — | — | — | — | — | — | Non-album singles |
| 2023 | "Afraid to Love" | — | — | — | — | — | — | — | — | Non-album singles |
| 2024 | "Hell Together" | — | — | — | — | — | — | — | — | Non-album singles |
| 2025 | "Crème Brulée" | — | — | — | — | — | — | — | — | Earthly Delights |
| 2025 | "Can I Call You" | — | — | — | — | — | — | — | — | Earthly Delights |
| 2025 | "Dulce Amor" | — | — | — | — | — | — | — | — | Earthly Delights |
| 2026 | "Love for Free" | — | — | — | — | — | — | — | — | |
"—" denotes a recording that did not chart or was not released in that territory.

=== As featured artist ===
| Year | Title | Peak chart positions | | Album |
| Year | Title | US | SPA | Album |
|---|---|---|---|---|
| 2009 | "I Wanna Know You" (Hannah Montana featuring David Archuleta) | 74 | — | Hannah Montana 3 |
| 2010 | "Somos El Mundo" (with Various Artists) | — | 31 | Single release only |
| 2011 | "Drummer Boy" (with Dapo) | — | — | Dapo & Friends Christmas – Volume 1 |
| 2016 | "Workin" (James The Mormon featuring David Archuleta) | — | — | Pmg |
| 2019 | "Anymore" (Madilyn Paige featuring David Archuleta) | — | — | Anymore |
| 2021 | "What a Beautiful Name" (BYU Vocal Point featuring David Archuleta) | — | — | Grace |
"—" denotes a recording that did not chart or was not released in that territory.

== Other charted songs ==
| Year | Title | Peak chart positions | | Album |
| Year | Title | US | CAN | Album |
|---|---|---|---|---|
| 2008 | "Imagine" | 36 | 31 | American Idol Performances |
| 2008 | "Don't Let the Sun Go Down on Me" | 58 | 50 | American Idol Performances |
| 2008 | "In this Moment" | 60 | 56 | American Idol Performances |
| 2008 | "Longer" | 115 | — | American Idol Performances |
| 2008 | "Angels" | 89 | — | David Archuleta |
"—" denotes a recording that did not chart or was not released in that territory.

== Other album/DVD appearances ==
=== Albums/DVDs ===
| Title | Details | Peak chart positions | | Sales |
| Title | Details | US | US Music Video | Sales |
|---|---|---|---|---|
| Glad Christmas Tidings (Mormon Tabernacle Choir featuring David Archuleta) | Released: September 6, 2011; Label: Intellectual Reserve; Formats: CD, DVD, Digital download | 179 | 39 | US: 28,000 |

=== Tracks ===
| Year | Title | Album |
|---|---|---|
| 2008 | "Angels in the Alleyway" (Merrick Christensen featuring David Archuleta) | Fear vs. Faith |
| 2008 | "The Most Beautiful Part About This Is..." (Merrick Christensen featuring David Archuleta) | Fear vs. Faith |
| 2009 | "I Wanna Know You" (Hannah Montana featuring David Archuleta) | Hannah Montana 3 |
| 2011 | "I Wanna Know You" (Hannah Montana featuring David Archuleta) | Best of Hannah Montana |

== Music videos ==
| Year | Title | Director |
|---|---|---|
| 2008 | "Crush" | Declan Whitebloom |
| 2008 | "A Little Too Not Over You" | Scott Speer |
| 2009 | "Touch My Hand" | Melina Matsoukas |
| 2010 | "Something 'Bout Love" | Declan Whitebloom |
| 2011 | "Wait" | [V] Entertainment |
| 2012 | "Nandito Ako" | Mac Alejandre |
| 2012 | "Forevermore" | Sony Music Philippines |
| 2012 | "I'll Never Go" | Sony Music Philippines |
| 2012 | "Everybody Hurts" | Jed Wells |
| 2012 | "Rainbow (Remix)" | Sony Music Philippines |
| 2013 | "Don't Run Away" | Kylie Malchus |
| 2014 | "Glorious" | Blair Treu |
| 2015 | "The Prayer" | —N/a |
| 2016 | "Numb" | Dusty Barker |
| 2017 | "Up All Night" | Nathan Lee |
| 2018 | "Seasons" | Dusty Barker |
| 2018 | "Christmas Every Day" | Dusty Barker |
| 2018 | "Winter in the Air" | RJ Idos |
| 2019 | "Anymore" (featuring Madilyn Paige) | Ty Arnold |
| 2019 | "Postcards in the Sky" | Dusty Barker |
| 2019 | "Paralyzed" | Brian Petchers |
| 2019 | "Merry Christmas, Happy Holidays" | Justin Thorne |
| 2020 | "OK, All Right" | Justin Thorne & Kevin McHale |
| 2020 | "Just Breathe" | —N/a |
| 2020 | "Switch" | Justin Thorne & Kevin McHale |
| 2020 | "My Heart Beats for You" (with Paul Cardall) | —N/a |
| 2020 | "What a Wonderful Way to End a Crazy Year" | —N/a |
| 2021 | "What a Beautiful Name" (with Hillsong Worship) | Cody Phillips |
| 2021 | "Movin'" | Nick Sales |
| 2021 | "Beast" | Justin Thorne |
| 2022 | "Faith In Me" | Justin Thorne & Kevin McHale |
| 2023 | "I'm Yours" | Brad Hammer |
| 2023 | "Afraid to Love" | Brad Hammer |
| 2024 | "Hell Together" | Lily Judge |
| 2025 | "Crème Brulée" | Nathan Kim |
| 2025 | "Dulce Amor" | Nathan Kim |
| 2026 | "Warm Me Up" | Joseph Adivari |
