= List of American Idol alumni album sales in the United States =

American Idol alumni album sales in the United States

This article provides a list of albums recorded by alumni of the popular American televised singing competition American Idol in the post-Idol career. It only lists main albums released in the alumni's post-Idol career. American Idol compilations, individual artist's pre-Idol recordings, EPs, and compilation albums are not listed here, however, the numbers in parentheses may include sales from these releases. For complete list of releases including those not listed here for each artist, please see their individual discography pages (linked here in the total number in parentheses). Sales figure listed are for U.S. only.

== Artists with sales of 500,000 or more albums ==
This first list only includes contestants with at least 500,000 total album sales. Total albums sold listed in this pages for each artist is shown first. Certification status of album for units shipped in U.S. (Gold, Platinum, and/or Multi-platinum) is shown if awarded. The numbers in parentheses are for sales for all albums including EPs and compilations which may not be listed here.

	Contestant Total albums sold	First album	Second album	Third album	Fourth album	Fifth album	Sixth album	Seventh album	Eighth album	Ninth album	Tenth album
1.	Carrie Underwood (season 4, winner); 22,500,000	Some Hearts (November 15, 2005); Arista Nashville; 7,450,000; 9× Platinum; Peak: #2	Carnival Ride (October 23, 2007); Arista Nashville; 3,400,000; 4× Platinum; Peak: #1	Play On (November 3, 2009); Arista Nashville; 2,300,000; 3× Platinum; Peak: #1	Blown Away (May 1, 2012); Arista Nashville; 1,853,200; 3× Platinum; Peak: #1	Storyteller (October 23, 2015); Arista Nashville; 752,100; Platinum; Peak: #2	Cry Pretty (September 14, 2018); Capitol Nashville; 534,000; Platinum; Peak: #1	My Gift (September 25, 2020); Capitol Nashville; 628,000; Gold; Peak: #5	My Savior (March 26, 2021); Capitol Nashville; 293,000; N/A; Peak: #4	Denim & Rhinestones (June 10, 2022); Capitol Nashville; 120,000; Peak: #10	
2.	Kelly Clarkson (season 1, winner); 14,150,000	Thankful (April 15, 2003); RCA; 2,800,000; 2× Platinum; Peak: #1	Breakaway (November 30, 2004); RCA; 6,355,000; 6× Platinum; Peak: #3	My December (June 26, 2007); RCA; 858,000; Platinum; Peak: #2	All I Ever Wanted (March 10, 2009); RCA; 1,004,000; N/A; Peak: #1	Stronger (October 24, 2011); RCA; 1,129,000; Platinum; Peak: #2	Wrapped in Red (October 29, 2013); RCA; 942,000; Platinum; Peak: #3	Piece by Piece (March 3, 2015); RCA; 284,000; Gold; Peak: #1	Meaning of Life (October 27, 2017); Atlantic; 68,000; Gold; Peak: #2	When Christmas Comes Around... (October 15, 2021); Atlantic; 106,000; Peak: #22	Chemistry (June 23, 2023); Atlantic; 53,000 Peak: #6
3.	Chris Daughtry (as Daughtry) (season 5, 4th place); 7,204,000	Daughtry (November 21, 2006); RCA; 5,040,000; 6× Platinum; Peak: #1	Leave This Town (July 14, 2009); RCA; 1,357,000; Platinum; Peak: #1	Break the Spell (November 21, 2011); RCA; 513,000; Gold; Peak: #8	Baptized (November 19, 2013); RCA; 270,000; Gold; Peak: #6	Cage to Rattle (July 17, 2018); RCA; 24,000; N/A; Peak: #10	Dearly Beloved (September 17, 2021); Dogtree; 88,000; N/A; Peak: #50				
4.	Clay Aiken (season 2, runner-up); 5,069,000	Measure of a Man (October 14, 2003); RCA; 2,786,000; 2× Platinum; Peak: #1	Merry Christmas with Love (November 16, 2004); RCA; 1,416,000; Platinum; Peak: #4	A Thousand Different Ways (September 19, 2006); RCA; 531,000; Gold; Peak: #2	On My Way Here (May 6, 2008); RCA; 165,000; N/A; Peak: #4	Tried and True (June 1, 2010); Decca; 80,000 ^{note 1} N/A; Peak: #9 / #120	Steadfast (March 25, 2012); Decca#120	Christmas Bells Are Ringing (November 22, 2024); Alvis			
5.	Fantasia Barrino (season 3, winner); 3,332,000	Free Yourself (November 23, 2004); J Records; 1,839,000; Platinum; Peak: #8	Fantasia (December 12, 2006); J Records; 530,000; Gold; Peak: #19	Back to Me (August 24, 2010); J Records; 490,000; N/A; Peak: #2	Side Effects of You (April 23, 2013); RCA; 300,000; Peak: #2	The Definition Of... (July 28, 2016); RCA; 32,000; Peak: #6	Christmas After Midnight (October 6, 2017); Concord; Peak: #193	Sketchbook (October 11, 2019); Rock Soul; 10,000; Peak: #62			
6.	Ruben Studdard (season 2, winner); 2,644,000	Soulful (December 9, 2003); J Records; 1,792,000; Platinum; Peak: #1	I Need an Angel (November 23, 2004); J Records; 483,000; Gold; Peak: #20	The Return (October 17, 2006); J Records; 238,000; N/A; Peak: #8	Love Is (May 19, 2009); Hickory Records; 50,000; N/A; Peak: #36	Letters from Birmingham (March 13, 2012); Shanachie; 17,000; N/A; Peak: #150	Unconditional Love (February 4, 2014); The Verve Music Group; 6,000; N/A; Peak: #46	Ruben Sings Luther (March 9, 2018); SEG Music; N/A; N/A; Peak: n/a	The Way I Remember It (October 27, 2023); SoNo Recording Group		
7.	Scotty McCreery (season 10, winner); 2,264,000	Clear as Day (October 4, 2011); Mercury Nashville; 1,166,000; Platinum; Peak: #1	Christmas With Scotty McCreery (October 16, 2012); Mercury Nashville; 382,000; Gold; Peak: #4	See You Tonight (October 15, 2013); Mercury Nashville; 269,900; N/A; Peak: #6	Seasons Change (March 16, 2018); Thirty Tigers; 97,800; Gold; Peak: #7	Same Truck (September 17, 2021); Thirty Tigers; N/A; Peak: #86	Rise & Fall (May 10, 2023); Thirty Tigers				
8.	Kellie Pickler (season 5, 6th place); 1,557,000	Small Town Girl (October 31, 2006); BNA; 900,000; Gold; Peak: #9	Kellie Pickler (September 30, 2008); BNA; 470,000; N/A; Peak: #9	100 Proof (January 24, 2012); BNA; 90,000; N/A; Peak: #7	The Woman I Am; November 11, 2013; Black River Entertainment; 47,000; N/A; Peak: #19						
9.	David Cook (season 7, winner); 1,510,000	David Cook (November 18, 2008); RCA; 1,380,000; Platinum; Peak: #3	This Loud Morning (June 28, 2011); RCA; 133,000; N/A; Peak: #7	Digital Vein (September 18, 2015); InGrooves Music; 11,000; N/A; Peak: #35							
10.	Phillip Phillips (season 11, winner); 1,495,000	The World from the Side of the Moon (November 19, 2012); Interscope; 1,033,000; Platinum; Peak: #4	Behind the Light (May 19, 2014); Interscope; 123,000; N/A; Peak: #7	Collateral (January 19, 2018); Interscope; 5,000; N/A; Peak: #141	Drift Back (June 9, 2023); Interscope						
11.	Jennifer Hudson (season 3, 7th place); 1,446,000	Jennifer Hudson (September 30, 2008); Arista; 839,000; Gold; Peak: #2	I Remember Me (March 22, 2011); Arista; 459,000; Gold; Peak: #2	JHUD (September 23, 2014); RCA; 61,000; N/A; Peak: #10	The Gift of Love (October 23, 2024); Interscope						
12.	Jordin Sparks (season 6, winner); 1,313,000	Jordin Sparks (November 20, 2007); Jive; 1,056,000; Platinum; Peak: #10	Battlefield (July 21, 2009); Jive; 190,000; N/A; Peak: #7	Right Here, Right Now (August 21, 2015); Louder Than Life; N/A; Peak: #161	Cider & Hennessy (November 26, 2020); Disrupt Group; N/A; Peak: N/A	No Restrictions (September 13, 2024) (Legacy Music Group)					
13.	Adam Lambert (season 8, runner-up); 1,173,000	For Your Entertainment (November 23, 2009); RCA; 863,000; Gold; Peak: #3	Trespassing (May 15, 2012); RCA; 197,000; N/A; Peak: #1	The Original High (June 16, 2015); Warner Bros Records; 52,000; N/A; Peak: #3	Velvet (March 20, 2020); Empire Records; N/A; Peak: #89	High Drama (February 24, 2023); BMG					
14.	David Archuleta (season 7, runner-up); 1,156,000	David Archuleta (November 11, 2008); Jive; 765,000; Gold; Peak: #2	Christmas from the Heart (October 13, 2009); Jive; 246,000; N/A; Peak: #30	The Other Side of Down (October 5, 2010); Jive; 67,000; N/A; Peak: #13	Forevermore (March 26, 2012); Ivory Records; N/A; N/A; Peak: N/A	Begin. (August 7, 2012); Highway Records; 14,000; N/A; Peak: #28	No Matter How Far (2013); E1 Music; 5,000; N/A; Peak: #110	Postcards in the Sky (October 20, 2017); Archie Music; N/A; N/A; Peak: N/A	Winter in the Air (November 2, 2018); Archie Music; N/A; N/A; Peak: #191	Therapy Sessions (May 20, 2020); Archie Music; N/A; N/A; Peak: N/A	
15.	Gabby Barrett (season 16, 3rd place); 1,000,000	Goldmine (June 19, 2020); Warner Music Nashville; 1,000,000; Platinum; Peak: #4	Chapter & Verse (February 2, 2024); Warner Music Nashville	Carols and Candlelight (November 8, 2024); Warner Music Nashville							
16.	Mandisa (season 5, 9th place); 928,000	True Beauty (July 31, 2007); Sparrow; 226,000; N/A; Peak: #43	It's Christmas (October 14, 2008); Sparrow; 64,000; N/A; Peak: #85	Freedom (March 24, 2009); Sparrow; 152,000; N/A; Peak: #83	What If We Were Real (April 5, 2011); Sparrow; 270,000; N/A; Peak: #66	Overcomer (August 27, 2013); Sparrow; 140,000; N/A; Peak: #29	Out of the Dark (May 19, 2017); Sparrow N/A; Peak: #20				
17.	Josh Gracin (season 2, 4th place); 804,000	Josh Gracin (June 15, 2004); Lyric Street; 703,000; Gold; Peak: #11	We Weren't Crazy (April 1, 2008); Lyric Street; 86,000; N/A; Peak: #33	Redemption (November 8, 2011); Average Joe's; 4,000; N/A; Peak: N/A							
18.	Taylor Hicks (season 5, winner); 768,000	Taylor Hicks (December 12, 2006); Arista; 705,000; Platinum; Peak: #2	The Distance (March 10, 2009); Modern Whomp; 52,000; N/A; Peak: #58								
19.	Bo Bice (season 4, runner-up); 757,000	The Real Thing (December 13, 2005); RCA; 673,000; Gold; Peak: #4	See the Light (October 23, 2007); StratArt; 62,000; N/A; Peak: #150	3 (May 18, 2010); Saguaro Road; 11,000; N/A; Peak: #154							
20.	Elliott Yamin (season 5, 3rd place); 696,000	Elliott Yamin (March 20, 2007); Hickory Records; RED Distribution; 527,000; Gold; Peak: #3	Sounds of the Season (October 14, 2007); Hickory Records; 81,000; N/A; Peak: #32	My Kind of Holiday (October 7, 2008); TRP Records, Fontana Distribution; 27,000; N/A; Peak: #162	Fight For Love (May 5, 2009); Hickory Records; 49,000; N/A; Peak: #26	Let's Get to What's Real (March 27, 2012); E1/Purpose Music Group; 2,000; N/A; Peak: N/A					

^Note 1 Aiken's album, Tried & True was re-packaged and re-released by Decca under the new name, Steadfast, concurrent with his appearance on The Celebrity Apprentice in 2012

== Artists with sales of less than 500,000 albums ==
The following is a list of other American Idol alumni album sales and reflects that commercial success can be achieved through association with American Idol and with post-Idol promotion, although the degree of success varies considerably. This list only includes contestants who have numbers available, and again does not include EPs, American Idol compilations, or pre-Idol recordings, numbers in parentheses however may include sales from these releases:

Rank	Former Contestant	Total Sales	Albums
21.	Katharine McPhee (season 5, runner-up)	475,000	Katharine McPhee (2007) #2 — 381,000; Unbroken (2010) #27 — 45,000; Christmas Is the Time…To Say I Love You (2010) did not chart — 23,000; Hysteria (2015) did not chart
22.	Lauren Alaina (season 10, runner-up)	459,500	Wildflower (2011) #5 — 303,000; Road Less Traveled (2016) #31 — 34,500
23.	Bucky Covington (season 5, 8th place) did not chart	436,000	Bucky Covington (2007) #4 — 433,000; Good Guys (2012) #178 — 3,000
24.	Blake Lewis (season 6, runner-up)	413,000	A.D.D. (Audio Day Dream) (2007) #10 — 350,000; Heartbreak on Vinyl (2009) #135 — 10,000; Portrait of a Chameleon (2013) did not chart — 2,000
25.	Kris Allen (season 8, winner)	401,600	Kris Allen (2009) #11 — 346,000; Thank You Camellia (2012) #26 — 35,000; Horizons (2014) #80 — 4,000; Letting You In (2016)
26.	William Hung (Season 3, Auditioner)	242,000	Inspiration (2004) #34 — 200,000; Hung for the Holidays (2004) did not chart — 35,000; Miracle: Happy Summer from William Hung (2005) did not chart — 7,000
27.	Kimberley Locke (season 2, 3rd place)	241,000	One Love (2004) #16 — 212,000; Based on a True Story (2007) #160 — 22,000; Christmas (2008) did not chart — 3,000
28.	Crystal Bowersox (season 9, runner-up)	230,000	Farmer's Daughter (2010) #28 — 205,000; All That For This (2013) #71 — 8,000
29.	Danny Gokey (season 8, 3rd place)	204,000	My Best Days (2010) #4 — 204,000; Hope in Front of Me (2014) #40
30.	James Durbin (season 10, 4th place)	194,000	Memories of a Beautiful Disaster (2011) #36 — 123,000; Celebrate (2014) #83
31.	Lee DeWyze (season 9, winner)	178,000	Live It Up (2010) #19 — 153,000; Frames (2013) #116 — 3,000; Oil & Water (2016)
32.	Diana DeGarmo (Season 3, Runner-Up)	168,000	Blue Skies (2004) #52
33.	Justin Guarini (season 1, runner-up)	146,000	Justin Guarini (2003) #20 — 146,000; Stranger Things Have Happened (2005) did not chart
34.	Haley Reinhart (season 10, 3rd place)	143,500	Listen Up! (2012) #17 —77,000; Better (2016) did not chart — 7,500
35.	Colton Dixon (season 11, 7th place)	128,000	A Messenger (2013) #15 — 100,000; Anchor (2014) #23 — 28,000; The Calm Before the Storm (2015) did not chart
36.	Tamyra Gray (season 1, 4th place)	123,000	The Dreamer (2004) #23
37.	Jason Castro (Season 7, 4th Place)	105,000	Jason Castro (2010) #18 — 54,000; Who I Am (2010) #198 — 18,000; Only a Mountain (2013) did not chart — 20,000
38.	Allison Iraheta (Season 8, 4th Place)	103,000	Just Like You (2009) #35
39.	Melinda Doolittle (season 6, 3rd place)	91,000	Coming Back to You (2009) #58
40.	Casey James (season 9, 3rd place)	77,000	Casey James (2012) #23
41.	Chris Sligh (season 6, 10th place)	64,000	Running Back to You (2008) #190 — 54,000; The Anatomy of Broken (2010) did not chart — 10,000
42.	LaToya London (Season 3, 4th Place)	58,000	Love & Life (2005) #82
43.	Phil Stacey (season 6, 6th place)	58,000	Phil Stacey (2008) #43 — 40,000; Into the Light (2009) did not chart — 18,000
44.	Mario Vazquez (season 4, Top 12)	56,000	Mario Vazquez (2006) #80
45.	George Huff (season 3, 5th place)	52,000	Miracles (2005) did not chart — 29,000; George Huff (2009) did not chart — 4,000
46.	Brooke White (season 7, 5th place)	48,000	High Hopes & Heartbreak (2009) #50 — 29,000; Gemini (2011) did not chart — 2,000
47.	Carly Smithson (as a part of We Are the Fallen) (Season 7, 6th Place)	41,000	Tear the World Down (2010) #33
48.	Jessica Sanchez (Season 11, Runner-up)	38,000	Me, You & the Music (2013) #26 — 17,000
49.	Kristy Lee Cook (season 7, 7th place)	32,000	Why Wait (2008) #49
50.	Candice Glover (Season 12, Winner)	27,000	Music Speaks (2014) #14
51.	Casey Abrams (season 10, 6th place)	27,000	Casey Abrams (2012) #101
52.	Constantine Maroulis (season 4, 6th place)	25,000	Constantine (2007) #75
53.	Caleb Johnson (season 13, winner)	24,000	Testify (2014) #24
54.	Paris Bennett (season 5, 5th place)	22,300	Princess P (2007) #133 — 22,000; A Royal Christmas (2008) did not chart — 300
55.	R. J. Helton (season 1, 5th place)	22,000	Real Life (2004) did not chart
56.	John Stevens (Season 3, 6th Place)	21,000	Red (2005) did not chart
57.	Michael Johns (season 7, 8th place)	20,000	Hold Back My Heart (2009) #97
58.	Jasmine Trias (season 3, 3rd place)	14,000	Jasmine Trias (2005) did not chart
59.	Ace Young (season 5, 7th place)	10,000	Ace Young (2008) #160
60.	LaKisha Jones (season 6, 4th place)	7,000	So Glad I'm Me (2009) did not chart
61.	Nick Fradiani (season 14, winner)	5,000	Hurricane (2016) #121
62.	Danny Noriega (season 7, semi)	5,000	Till Death Do Us Party (2014) #59; After Party (2016) #192; Whatever (2017)
63.	Trent Harmon (season 15, winner)	4,500	You Got 'Em All (2018) did not chart
64.	Jim Verraros (season 1, 9th place)	4,300	Rollercoaster (2005) did not chart; Do Not Disturb (2011) did not chart
65.	Carmen Rasmusen (season 2, 6th place)	3,100	Nothin' Like the Summer (2007) did not chart
66.	Kimberly Caldwell (season 2, 7th place)	3,000	Without Regret (2011) did not chart
67.	Ayla Brown (season 5, Top 16)	3,000	Forward (2006) did not chart
68.	Corey Clark (season 2, 9th place)	2,600	Corey Clark (2005) did not chart
69.	Tim Halperin (Season 10, Semifinal)	2,000	Rise and Fall (2011) did not chart
70.	Jon Peter Lewis (Season 3, 8th Place)	1,600	Stories from Hollywood (2006) did not chart — 1,100; Break the Silence (2008) did not chart — 500
71.	Michael Sarver (season 8, 10th place)	1,000	Michael Sarver (2010) did not chart
72.	Kree Harrison (season 12, runner-up)	900	This Old Thing (2016) did not chart
