= Michael Blum (musician) =

American singer, songwriter, guitarist, and record producer

- Born: Michael Robert Blum; Great Neck, New York, U.S.
- Genres: Pop, Singer-songwriter
- Occupations: songwriter; record producer; multi-instrumentalist
- Instruments: Vocals; guitar; bass; piano; keyboard
- Website: michaelblummusic.com

Michael Blum is an American producer, songwriter and multi-instrumentalist based in Los Angeles, California. He has co-written and produced songs for artists including Haley Joelle, David Archuleta, Caleb Hearn, Maddie Zahm, Lily Meola, Girl Named Tom, and The Reklaws. He also co-wrote and produced the song "Wish That You Were Me" for Only Murders in the Building, which was featured throughout the series' fifth season. He attended Dartmouth College, where he double-majored in music and cognitive science.

== Select Discography ==
Title	Year	Artist(s)	Album	Co-writer	Producer or Co-producer	Notes
"Babydoll"	2026	Jamie Miller	TBA	Yes	Yes	
"i think i'm addicted"	2025	oskar med k, Haley Joelle	i think i'm addicted	Yes		#1 on Dance/Mix Show Airplay, 17 weeks on Hot Dance/Electronic
"Addicted"	2025	Haley Joelle	Addicted	Yes	Yes	
"Crème Brulée"	2025	David Archuleta	Earthly Delights (EP)	Yes	Yes	Remixes featuring Esteman & Haylee Wood
"Can I Call You"	2025	David Archuleta	Earthly Delights (EP)	Yes	Yes	
"Give You The World"	2025	David Archuleta	Earthly Delights (EP)	Yes	Yes	
"Lucky"	2025	David Archuleta	Earthly Delights (EP)	Yes	Yes	
"Home"	2025	David Archuleta	Earthly Delights (EP)		Yes	
"Inside Out"	2025	David Archuleta	Earthly Delights (EP)	Yes	Yes	
"Spaceship"	2025	Lily Meola	Postcards to Heaven	Yes	Yes	
"Lasting Effects"	2025	Avery Lynch	Lasting Effects		Yes	
"It's That Time of Year"	2025	Chung Ha	Christmas Promises: Again	Yes		
"How To Be Your Girl"	2025	Abigail Barlow	Bi-con	Yes	Yes	
"You"	2025	Gatton	Cusp	Yes		
"Do Without Me"	2025	Dylan Brady	Do Without Me	Yes		
"True-ish"	2025	OSTON	True-ish	Yes	Yes	
"right person, right time"	2025	yaeow	right person, right time	Yes	Yes	
"Outliving"	2024	The Reklaws	Outliving	Yes	Yes	
"Don't Quit Your Daydream"	2024	The Reklaws	Outliving	Yes	Yes	
"Get A Little Lost"	2024	Girl Named Tom	Get A Little Lost	Yes	Yes	
"LA"	2024	Haley Joelle	LA	Yes	Yes	
"Saint Rich."	2024	OSTON	Saint Rich.	Yes	Yes	
"How Did You Know"	2023	Caleb Hearn	Birthdays & Funerals	Yes	Yes	
"Burton St."	2023	OSTON	Burton St.	Yes	Yes	
"Maid of Honor"	2023	Haley Joelle	Maid of Honor		Yes	
"DNA"	2023	Haley Joelle	DNA		Yes	
"Tattoo Me"	2023	Haley Joelle	Tattoo Me	Yes	Yes	
"Forgive and Forget"	2023	Jake Cornell	Forgive and Forget	Yes	Yes	
"Remind Me"	2023	Devon Gabriella	Remind Me	Yes	Yes	
"Afraid of Heights"	2023	Devon Gabriella	Afraid of Heights	Yes	Yes	
"Two Places at Once"	2022	Haley Joelle	Two Places at Once	Yes	Yes	
"Things You Don't Know"	2022	Haley Joelle	Two Places at Once	Yes	Yes	
"Magical Thinking"	2022	Haley Joelle	Two Places at Once	Yes	Yes	
"Hope You're Well"	2022	Haley Joelle	Two Places at Once	Yes	Yes	
"One Way Mirror"	2022	Haley Joelle	Two Places at Once	Yes	Yes	
"Proof"	2022	Haley Joelle	Two Places at Once	Yes	Yes	
"I Hope You Think of Me"	2022	Lily Williams	How The Story Ends	Yes	Yes	
"Rich"	2022	Lily Williams	How The Story Ends	Yes	Yes	
"Fall For You"	2021	Sophie Ann	Fall For You	Yes	Yes	
"Masochist"	2021	Sophie Ann	Masochist	Yes	Yes	
"Silverlake Reservoir"	2021	3 cities	Killing Time	Yes	Yes	
"Killing Time"	2021	3 cities	Killing Time	Yes	Yes	
"I Wanna Know"	2021	3 cities	Killing Time	Yes	Yes	
"Pretending"	2021	3 cities	Killing Time	Yes	Yes	
"Red Flag"	2021	3 cities	Killing Time	Yes	Yes	
"From The Start"	2021	3 cities	Killing Time	Yes	Yes	
"Cemetery"	2021	3 cities	Killing Time	Yes	Yes	
"Whose Life Am I Living"	2021	3 cities	Killing Time	Yes	Yes	
"People Pleaser"	2021	3 cities	Killing Time	Yes	Yes	
"Black Tears"	2021	3 cities	Killing Time	Yes	Yes	
"Born in the Middle"	2021	Jenna Lotti	Born in the Middle	Yes	Yes	
"Thank You For Breaking My Heart"	2021	Jenna Lotti	Thank You For Breaking My Heart	Yes	Yes	
"Dear Hollywood"	2021	Michelle Ray	Before U	Yes	Yes	
"Dark"	2021	Michelle Ray	Before U	Yes	Yes	
"Bad By Myself"	2021	Michelle Ray	Before U	Yes	Yes	
"Overlap"	2021	Michelle Ray	Before U	Yes	Yes	
"Tattoo"	2021	Michelle Ray	Before U	Yes	Yes	
"Let Me Know"	2020	WESLEY	Let Me Know		Yes	
"Wishes"	2020	WESLEY	Wishes		Yes	
"Punchline"	2020	WESLEY	Punchline	Yes	Yes	
"Happy"	2020	Jake Clark	Happy	Yes	Yes	
"Her"	2020	Jenna Lotti	Her		Yes	
"How to Be Loved"	2020	Jenna Lotti	How to Be Loved	Yes	Yes	
"Fake ID"	2020	Jenna Lotti	Fake ID	Yes	Yes	
"I'm Fine"	2020	Michelle Ray	I'm Fine	Yes	Yes	
"How Long"	2020	Sophie Ann	Just Me		Yes	
"You Can't Just"	2020	Sophie Ann	Just Me		Yes	
"Rinse Repeat"	2020	Sophie Ann	Just Me	Yes	Yes	
"Bad Attitude"	2020	Sophie Ann	Just Me	Yes	Yes	
"24 Hours"	2020	Ella M	Yellow Blazer	Yes	Yes	
