= Quân khu 7 Stadium =

Sports venue in Ho Chi Minh City, Vietnam

- Sân vận động Quân khu 7
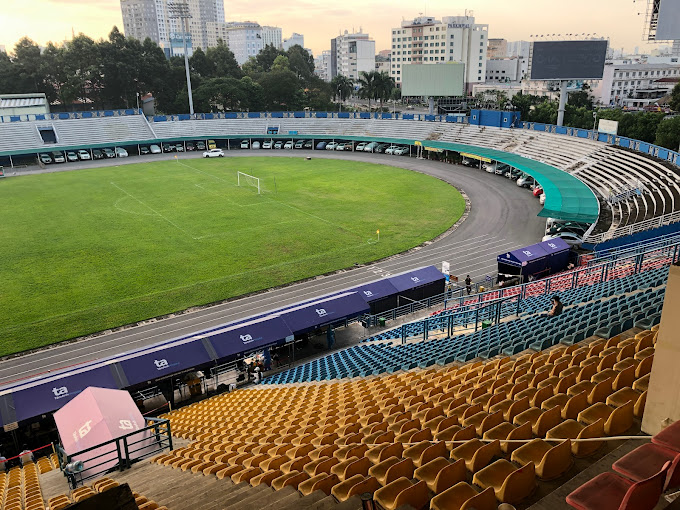
- Interactive map of Quân khu 7 Stadium
- Former names: Military Stadium; Pershing Field Ball Park
- Address: 2A Phan Đình Giót street, Tân Sơn Hòa; Ho Chi Minh City; Vietnam
- Location: Headquarters of 7th Military Region, Tân Bình District
- Coordinates: 10°48′06″N 106°40′02″E
- Owner: Vietnamese Government
- Operator: National Defense Sports Center Region 2
- Capacity: 25,000; 18,000 (concert)
- Public transit: HCMC Bus Route 4, 7, 8, 51, 64, 104, 152

Construction
- Renovated: 2003

Tenants
- Tổng Tham Mưu (1952–1975); Quân khu 7 F.C. (2000–2008); Thép Miền Nam Cảng Sài Gòn (2007)

Quân khu 7 Stadium (7th Military Region Stadium or Military Zone 7 Stadium, Vietnamese: Sân vận động Quân khu 7) is a stadium in Tân Bình District and part of the Headquarters of 7th Military Region or simply called as the area of 7th Military Region, a military area mostly in the adjacented Phú Nhuận District, it's 10 minutes away from Tan Son Nhat International Airport, Ho Chi Minh City. It has a capacity of around 25,000 people.

== History ==
Before the Fall of Saigon, the stadium was called "Republic of Vietnam Military Stadium" or simply "Military Stadium"; it was also known as "Pershing Field Ball Park", named after Pershing Field in New Jersey, to American soldiers. This was the site of a bombing incident on February 9, 1964, that killed 2 and injured 20 people. The stadium was completely rebuilt in 2003.

== Tenants ==
This was the ARVN General Staff football club's home stadium from 1952 until 1975. After renovations, the stadium hosted one men's football match as part of the 2003 Southeast Asian Games. It was also one of the venues of 2007 AFC Asian Cup finals, hosted by four South-East Asian countries, Indonesia, Malaysia, Thailand and Vietnam. Quân khu 7 Stadium was the home field for Quân khu 7 F.C. before the club was transferred in 2009, as well as Thép Miền Nam Cảng Sài Gòn F.C. (now known as Hồ Chí Minh City F.C.) for 2007 V-League.

Below are some of the international football matches played at Quân khu 7 Stadium:

Date	Team 1	Result	Team 2	Round	Tournament
6 September 2003	Cambodia	1–5	Singapore	Group stage	2003 Southeast Asian Games
16 July 2007	Qatar	1–2	United Arab Emirates	Group stage	2007 AFC Asian Cup

== Entertainment ==
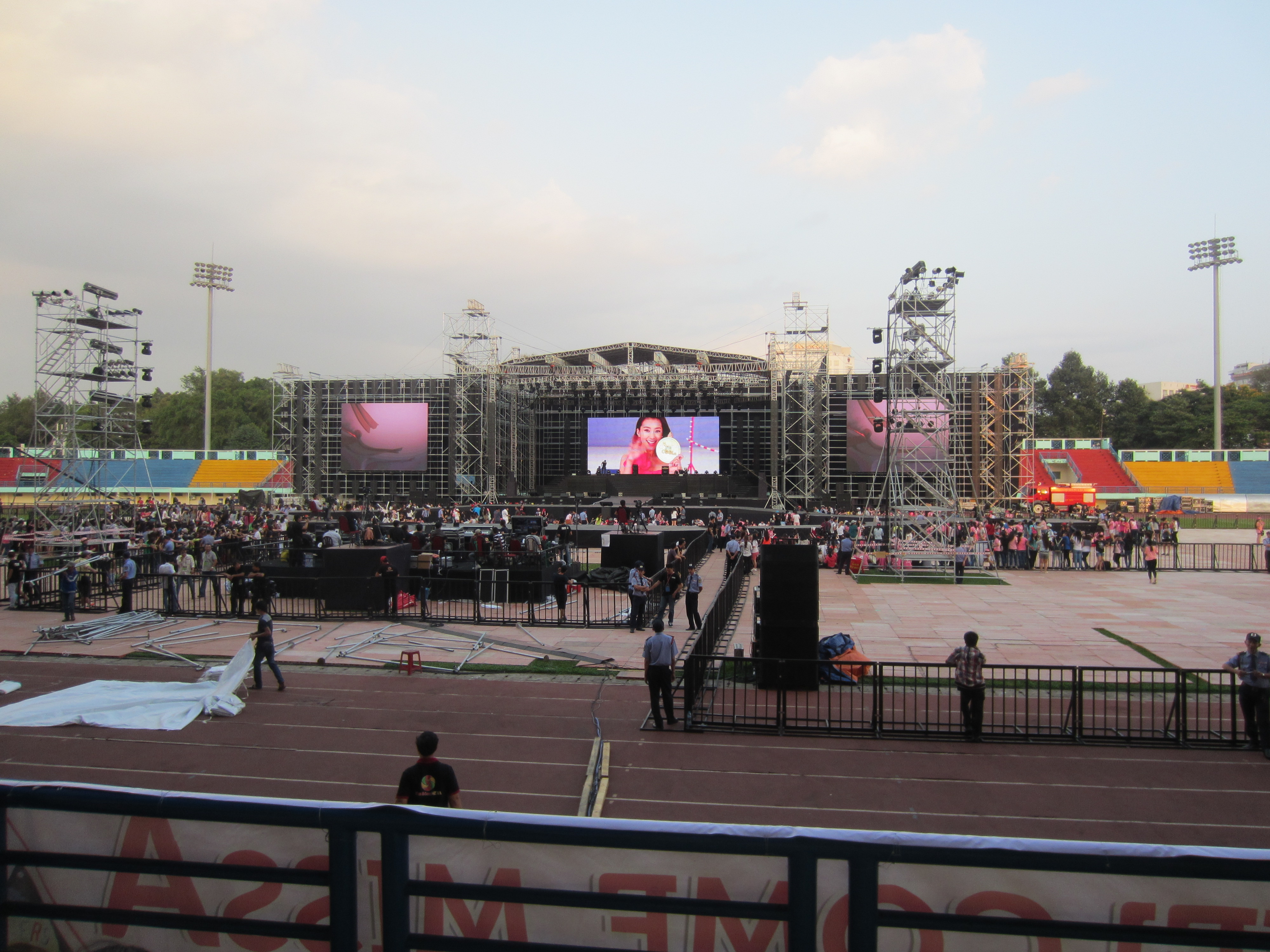
HEC K-Pop Festival held at the stadium in 2014

Through the years, the stadium remains the favorite choice for large-scale entertainment events in the city due to its design. The stadium's stand A is covered by a roof and seating 6,700 people - more than the capacity of the city's largest indoor venue (Phu Tho Indoor Stadium) and similar to the comparable section at the older Thong Nhat Stadium. At an optimal concert configuration, the stadium could hold up to 18,000 people.

Korean artist Rain had two concerts in this stadium in 2006 and 2007. In 2008, American alternative rock band My Chemical Romance had a concert here as part of Tiger's United08 Concert. In 2010, The Click Five had a concert here as a part of MTV EXIT concerts in several Vietnam cities. In 2011, Backstreet Boys and David Archuleta held their own concerts here as part of their respective Asian tour. F4 Thailand casts had their "Shooting Star Concert" here on March 4, 2023. Ariana Grande was scheduled to perform her first concert in Vietnam at the stadium on August 23, 2017, as part of "Dangerous Woman Tour", but then she had to cancel the due to her sickness.

List of concerts at Quân khu 7 Stadium
Year	Date	Main act(s)	Tour/Concert name
2004	March 25	My Tam	Yesterday & Now Liveshow
2005	September 27	My Tam	The Power of Dreams Live Tour
2007	March 10	Bi Rain	Rain's Coming World Tour
2008	January 20	My Chemical Romance	Tiger's United08 / The Black Parade World Tour
2010	April 17	The Click Five	MTV EXIT
2011	March 24	Backstreet Boys	This Is Us Tour
2011	July 22	David Archuleta	The Other Side of Down Asian Tour
2014	March 22	SNSD, miss A, 2PM, SISTAR and 365daband	HEC K-Pop Festival 2014
2014	August 30	JYJ	The Return of The King Asia Tour 2014
2014	September 28	Hardwell	I Am Hardwell Tour
2014	November 9	My Tam	Heartbeat Live Concert Tour
2016	October 2	Đông Nhi	It's Showtime Liveshow
2016	November 12	Noo Phuoc Thinh	FunRing Day Liveshow
2016	December 21	Michael Learns To Rock, Sơn Tùng M-TP and Wonder Girls	Sky Connection
2018	December 22	Đông Nhi	Ten on Ten Liveshow
2023	March 4	F4 Thailand: Boys Over Flowers cast	Shooting Star Asia Tour
2023	March 11	Super Junior	Super Show 9: Road
