= JTM (rapper) =

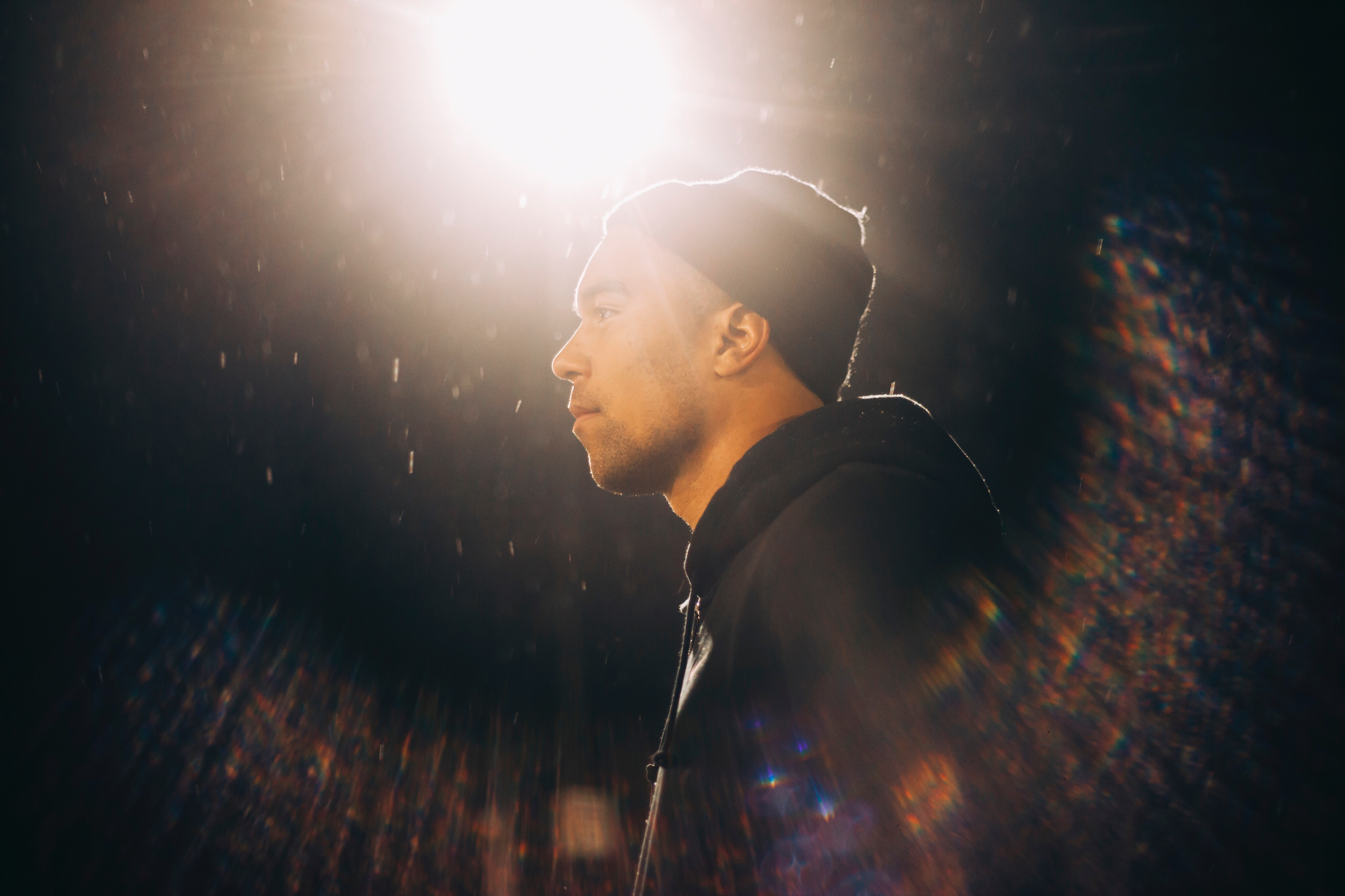
- James The Mormon
- Born: James Brandt Curran
- Occupation: Rapper
- Years active: 2001–2019
- Musical career
- Genres: Hip hop; R&B
- Instrument: Vocals
- Website: jtm.com

James Brandt Curran (born August 19, 1986) is an American rapper, singer, songwriter, and record producer. James is more commonly known by his stage name JTM, formerly James the Mormon. Although he does not make religious music, he self-identifies as a religious person. JTM is a member of the Church of Jesus Christ of Latter-day Saints.

== Music career ==
JTM started posting videos on his YouTube channel in 2014 which attracted much attention from his religious community. He then released I'm Not a Rapper, anticipating that rapping would just be a hobby for him. I'm Not a Rapper reached No. 1 on the Billboard Heatseekers chart.

JTM followed up his debut EP with the release of Pmg. The music on the album is influenced by religious themes including missionary work. Concerning the inspiration of making a religiously inspired EP JTM stated "I do not make Christian or Mormon music,"... "I want to reach the kid who feels obligated to go to church or is struggling with his or her testimony. I want to reach non-members and show them that there are Mormons just like them. And that Mormons listen to rap and are cool. I hate that myths and poor stereotypes of the Church hold people back from something so beautiful." "Workin", featuring David Archuleta was released.

On May 2, 2018, JTM released his first full-length LP: We Came to Play, which reached No. 7 on the Billboard Heatseekers chart. JTM donated 50% of the proceeds from the album's pre-order sales to Operation Underground Railroad, a charity dedicated to rescuing children from sex trafficking.

In 2019 JTM released a music video on YouTube entitled "I Will Never Stop II".

== Discography ==
=== Studio albums ===
Title	Details	Peak chart positions	
Title	Details	US Heat.	US R&B/HH
I'm Not a Rapper	Released: April 17, 2016; Label: James the Mormon; Format: Digital download	1	13
Pmg	Released: August 6, 2016; Label: James the Mormon; Format: Digital download	—	—
We Came to Play	Released: May 2, 2018; Label: James the Mormon; Format: Digital download	7	—

=== Singles ===
Title	Details	Peak chart positions
Title	Details	US R&B/HH
"Workin" featuring David Archuleta	Released: August 7, 2016; Label: James the Mormon; Format: Digital download	20
"Treasure" featuring Yahosh Bonner	Released: May 10, 2016; Label: James the Mormon; Format: Digital download	—
