= Chords of Strength =

Memoir by David Archuleta

Chords of Strength: A Memoir of Soul, Song and the Power of Perseverance
- Author: David Archuleta
- Language: English
- Subject: Music
- Genre: Memoir
- Publisher: Celebra Hardcover
- Publication date: June 1, 2010
- Publication place: United States
- Media type: Print (hardcover) (paperback (May 3, 2011))
- ISBN: 978-0-451-23018-8

Chords of Strength: A Memoir of Soul, Song and the Power of Perseverance is a memoir written by American singer David Archuleta with Monica Haim. It was published by Celebra Books, part of Penguin Group, on June 1, 2010. It was previously set for release on May 4 but later postponed.

== Plot summary ==
The memoir starts with Archuleta describing his childhood in Florida with his family and eventually moving to Utah. He introduced his readers to his family members, including how his mother, Lupe, was born in San Pedro Sula, Honduras, and enjoyed dancing and singing with her sisters when she was younger.

Archuleta reveals that music has been a huge influence in his family for generations and that his father, Jeff, is a jazz trumpet player and that he has been a musical influence on him because he taught him the concepts of improvisation. Archuleta also described the impact the musical Les Misérables had on him and also the influence of the first season of American Idol. He described his experiences in the Utah Talent Show, Jenny Jones' Show, and Star Search, for which he won the title of Junior Vocal Champion.

The vocal cord paralysis Archuleta suffered at a young age was described in detail, including how he felt and what the experience has done for him and taught him. He then continues to describe his decisions and various events leading up to his audition and participation on the seventh season of American Idol. As a member of the Church of Jesus Christ of Latter-day Saints, Archuleta writes about how his faith encouraged him, influenced him, kept him grounded and helped him stay optimistic throughout his challenges. Archuleta showed love for his fans by writing how much he appreciates their support and provided his top 3 fan encounters. Inspiring others to also follow their dreams and make a difference, Archuleta concludes his memoir with "And remember, even when you can't sing, you can always plant a tree".

== Promotion and sales ==
David Archuleta promoted his memoir by embarking upon a small nationwide book tour, with the first stop at the bookstore Bookends in Ridgewood, New Jersey on June 1. Chords of Strength became a #15 New York Times Best Seller on June 11, making him the first New York Times Best Seller from Celebra. Archuleta's book signing at Deseret Books in Rexburg, Idaho on June 17 attracted approximately 1500–2000 people and the extra 233 copies sold that day were "definitely above normal".
