= Nexxus (band) =

Filipino pop rock band

Nexxus is a Filipino pop rock band formed in 1991. They are best known for the song "I'll Never Go", the group's first single from their debut album Pictures in My Mind, released in 1994. They received an Awit Award in the category Best Pop Recording given by the Philippine Association of the Record Industry (PARI) for "I'll Never Go". The band is composed of Pett del Rosario and Deck Pagsangjan on vocals, Erwin dela Cruz on keyboards, Jerwin Galarion on bass, Mike Motos on drums and Frank Singcol on guitar.

The band received their very first gold record award for their album Pictures in My Mind. The album includes "How Can I Forget You", "Kaibigan Mo", "Don't Give Up for Love", "Walang Hanggan", "Tagumpay", and "Kung Ako'y Uuwi". Most of the songs of Nexxus were written and arranged by Pett del Rosario, Frank Singcol, and Erwin dela Cruz.

In March 1998, the band released their second album I Keep On Saying. It includes the title track "I Keep On Saying".

"I'll Never Go" was covered in 2005 by Erik Santos from his album Loving You Now which was the theme song of Stained Glass followed by the 2007 film One More Chance. "I'll Never Go" was also covered by American pop singer David Archuleta from his first Filipino album Forevermore in 2012.
