= Haley Joelle =

American singer-songwriter

- Born: Haley Joelle Intile-Epstein; October 5, 1999 (age 26); Long Island, New York, U.S.
- Genres: Pop
- Occupations: Singer; songwriter
- Instruments: Vocals; piano
- Years active: 2017–present

Haley Joelle Intile-Epstein (born October 5, 1999), also known as Haley Joelle, is an American singer-songwriter who started getting recognition on TikTok in late 2020 for her original songs.

== Biography ==
In 2018–2019, Joelle attended the first year of LIMPI, a pop music school backed by Stargate.

Her song "Emergency Contact" was issued in March 2021 as her first official release, after a TikTok of the track, inspired by the TV show The Bachelor, went viral, amassing over 2.6 million views. In November, Joelle independently released her debut EP, Sideways Heart.

In January 2022, Joelle published "Memory Lane" as a single, which was later featured in Amazon Prime Video's film Culpa Mía.

Joelle independently released her debut, full-length album, Two Places at Once, in November 2022. In 2023, she won International Rookie of the Year at the Denniz Pop Awards in Sweden.

== Discography ==
Haley Joelle discography
- Studio albums: 3
- EPs: 2
- Music videos: 10

=== Studio albums ===
Title	Album details
Two Places at Once	Released: November 11, 2022; Label: Self-released; Format: LP, digital download, streaming
Me and My Past	Released: November 10, 2023; Label: Self-released; Format: LP, digital download, streaming
Crossing More Than City Lines	Released: September 6, 2024; Label: Self-released; Format: digital download, streaming

=== EPs ===
Title	EP details
Sideways Heart	Released: November 11, 2021; Label: Self-released; Format: Digital download, streaming
Two Places at Once (Part I)	Released: September 1, 2022; Label: Self-released; Format: Digital download, streaming
