= Glad Christmas Tidings =

Live album by Mormon Tabernacle Choir featuring David Archuleta
- Released: September 6, 2011
- Recorded: 2010
- Genre: Christmas
- Length: 65:44
- Label: Mormon Tabernacle Choir
- Producers: Bruce Leek; Ryan T. Murphy; Fred Vogler; Mack Wilberg

Mormon Tabernacle Choir chronology
The Most Wonderful Time of the Year (2010)	Glad Christmas Tidings (2011)	Once Upon a Christmas (2012)

David Archuleta chronology
The Other Side of Down (2010)	Glad Christmas Tidings (2011)	Forevermore (2012)

Glad Christmas Tidings is an album by the Mormon Tabernacle Choir, recorded during their 2010 Christmas shows in the LDS Conference Center with special guests David Archuleta and Michael York. The album was released on September 6, 2011 along with a concert DVD. The recorded concert was broadcast on PBS during December 2011 to more than 4 million Americans and is the No. 1-rated entertainment program on PBS during the holidays each year, according to PBS CEO Paula Kerger. As of November 2011, the album had sold in excess of 28,000 copies.

== Critical reception ==
Stephen Eddins from AllMusic found that the album "includes an attractive sampling of traditional carols, classical pieces, and newer repertoire [...] Soloist David Archuleta is featured on six of the tracks [...] The choir and the Orchestra at Temple Square perform with their traditional fullness and warmth. The album should be of special interest to Archuleta's fans and listeners looking for a mix of standard carols and newer Christmas music."

== Track listing ==
CD
No.	Title	Performer(s)	Length
1.	"Processional: A Christmas Roundelay"	Choir, Orchestra, and Bells	4:46
2.	"Joy to the World"	David Archuleta with Choir and Orchestra	3:20
3.	"The Cat and the Mouse Carol"	David Archuleta with Choir and Orchestra	6:28
4.	"Gloria in Excelsis, from Mass in C Minor, K. 421"	Choir and Orchestra	2:23
5.	"Gesú Bambino"	David Archuleta with Choir and Orchestra	4:21
6.	"Ring Out, Ye Crystal Spheres, from Hodie"	Choir and Orchestra	4:29
7.	"Los Pastores a Belén"	David Archuleta with Orchestra	2:58
8.	"Silent Night"	David Archuleta with Orchestra	4:53
9.	"Three Dancing Carols: The Shepherds / Ring, Bells / Bright and Glorious Is the Sky"	Choir, Orchestra, and Bells	5:47
10.	"A Holiday Hoedown for Organ ('Deck Them Halls')"	Richard Elliott	2:17
11.	"Away in a Manger"	Choir and Orchestra	3:34
12.	"Angels from the Realms of Glory"	David Archuleta with Choir, Orchestra, and Bells	4:39
13.	"Sing, Choir of Angels"	Michael York with Orchestra	14:58
Total length:			65:44

== Charts ==
=== Weekly charts ===
Weekly chart performance for Glad Christmas Tidings
Chart (2011–2013)	Peak position
US Billboard 200	179
US Top Classical Albums (Billboard)	6
US Top Christian Albums (Billboard)	10
US Top Holiday Albums (Billboard)	11

=== Year-end charts ===
2011 year-end chart performance for Glad Christmas Tidings
Chart (2011)	Position
US Top Classical Albums (Billboard)	44

2012 year-end chart performance for Glad Christmas Tidings
Chart (2012)	Position
US Top Classical Albums (Billboard)	13
