= Caleb Hearn =

- Occupation: Singer-Songwriter
- Instrument: Guitar
- Label: Nettwerk Music Group
- Spouse: Michal Leah (m. 2024)
- Website: www.calebhearnmusic.com

Caleb Hearn (born June 23, 2000) is an American singer-songwriter. His single, "Always Be 2.0" went viral on TikTok in 2020.

Hearn cites NF, John Mayer and Ed Sheeran as inspirations.

== Early life and education ==
Born in Mount Airy, North Carolina, raised Baptist, Hearn grew up surrounded by faith and music. His mother is a songwriter, his uncle is a musician and Hearn was a singer at church. As a young boy, he discovered guitar, and began writing songs at age 12. While in high school, he started playing sports, and stopped writing as much. Hearn graduated high school in 2018.

== Career ==
After high school, Hearn did a stint at community college. He re-discovered his love for music during COVID, when he began releasing music on TikTok. In 2022, Hearn moved his friend to Nashville to pursue their respective careers in the music industry.

In 2020, Hearn wrote “Always Be,” in the wake of his best friend dying in 2017. It took three years for Hearn to process the death, in part by composing the song, which as he told Rolling Stone, “felt like I was finally able to, not get over [the death] because I’m never going to get over it, but express how I was feeling.” When Hearn released the song, the original beat was purchased without Hearn’s knowledge. Hearn is quoted in Rolling Stone, saying that “an artist blowing up on TikTok is the most vulnerable person ever. Hearn re-imagined the song, asking his TikTok followers for support, and “Always Be 2.0” went viral.

In 2022, Hearn got his first label deal with Nettwerk Music Group and released his EP, We’re Getting Older. The following year, Hearn released the EP 1200 sq ft, produced by Marc Scibilia, which features a collaboration with John-Luke Carter (aka Mokita) on “1Day You Will.”

In 2024, Hearn toured with Switchfoot, Oliver Hazard, and Ashley Kutcher. His duet with Rosie happened as a result of Hearn DM’ing her on Instagram her to see if she’d be open to collabing. They met up in Los Angeles, wrote “Little Bit Better” in a day. Other collaborations include with TikToker Eunice Rain, Hattus, Chezka Sabalza, Underdog Music, Michal Leah, Jillian Rossi, Haywood, Mokita and Jenna Raine.

In 2025, he performed “Little Bit Better” on Monster RX 93.1 Concert Series, on the Indonesian TV Awards with Shabrina Leonita, Mustang 88 FM, the Roommate Project, Germany’s Moma Morgenmagazin as well as Fernseh Garten. He’s done international festivals such as Reeperbahn and Radar Festivals.

Hearn has 1.5 million TikTok followers and 2.6 million monthly listeners on Spotify.

== Discography ==
YEAR	ALBUM/SINGLE/EP	TITLE	COLLAB
2025	Single	“Bite the Bullet”	Jenna Raine
	Single	"Waiting Here (10 Years Later with Caleb)”	Jake Isaac
	Singles	"Silver Lining,” Play It Safe,” “The Lows,” "Hero"	
2024	Single	“Klonopin,”	
	Singles	"Break a Promise,” "Little Bit Better"	ROSIE
	Single	“Never Have I Ever”	Casey Baker
	ALBUM	Left on McKinney	
2023	EP	1200 sq ft	
	Single	“Think I’m Gonna Love You”	Michal Leah
	Singles	“Birthdays & Funerals (Wedding Version),” “Dear Son or Daughter,” "1200 sq ft,” “1 day you will,” “½ as good as her”	
2022	EP	We’re Getting Older	
	Single	“We’re Getting Older”	COASTR.
	Single	"Room For You"	sad alex
	Single	"Damage"	Haywood
	Singles	"Mistletoe," “Where Do We Go From Here”	
2021	Single	“Under The Weather”	Jillian Rossi
	Single	“It’s Always Been You,” “Brown Eyes, Brown Hair”	
2020	Singles	“Always Be 2.0,” “You Know,” “Distracted,” "No Lie"	
	Single	“Lost My Mind”	Elevate
	Single	"Vibe"	Dueski
	Single	"I Told You"	Ava Camille
2019	Singles	“Keep to Myself,” “Stories”	
	Single	"Air"	Dueski

== Personal ==
Hearn lives in Nashville and is married to Michal Leah.
