= Postcards in the Sky =

Studio album by David Archuleta
- Released: October 20, 2017
- Genre: Pop
- Length: 57:21
- Label: Archie Music / Tone tree Music

David Archuleta chronology
No Matter How Far (2013)	Postcards in the Sky (2017)	Winter in the Air (2018)

Singles from Postcards in the Sky
- 1. "Numb" Released: November 3, 2016; 2. "Up All Night" Released: April 21, 2017; 3. "Invincible" Released: October 19, 2017; 4. "Seasons (ft. Madilyn Paige)" Released: January 25, 2018; 5. "Postcards in the Sky" Released: March 22, 2019

Postcards in the Sky is the sixth studio album by American singer David Archuleta. It was released on October 20, 2017, independently through his own Archie Music label, and is composed of sixteen tracks and is the first album by the singer to feature entirely original material since The Other Side of Down (2010). Its lead single, "Numb", was released on November 3, 2016.

== Content ==
Earlier in release year, Archuleta released two extended plays that would build up to this album, Orion on May 19, with tracks "Numb", "Invincible", "Say Me", and "Up All Night", and Leo on August 25, with tracks "Other Things in Sight", "Someone to Love", "I'm Ready", and "Spotlight Down". The singles from this album were "Numb", "Up All Night", "Invincible", "Seasons", and the title track "Postcards in the Sky".

== Track listing ==
No.	Title	Writer(s)	Length
1.	"Postcards in the Sky"	David Archuleta, Jeffrey Trott, Victoria Horn	3:46
2.	"Invincible"	Archuleta, Stephanie Mabey, Taylor S. Hartley	3:56
3.	"Numb"	Archuleta, Trent Dabbs, Jamie Kenney	3:42
4.	"Someone to Love"	Archuleta, Jeremy Bose, Cindy Morgan	3:11
5.	"Spotlight Down"	Archuleta, Kimberly Isabeau Miller, Shaun Balin, Camille Nelson	3:10
6.	"I'm Ready"	Archuleta, Cason Cooley, Annie Schmidt	4:02
7.	"Other Things in Sight"	Archuleta, Bose, Dabbs	3:09
8.	"Say Me"	Archuleta, Bose, Dabbs	3:05
9.	"Upset With Me"	Archuleta	4:53
10.	"Up All Night"	Archuleta, Miller, Balin, Kenney	4:05
11.	"Waiting in the Stars"	Archuleta, Horn, Drew Lawrence	3:54
12.	"Seasons" (featuring Madilyn Paige)	Archuleta, Mabey, Dustin Christiensen	4:22
13.	"Cracks of Heaven"	Archuleta, Kayliann Lowe, Pete Sallis, Robert Douglas Lowe, Jr.	3:55
14.	"Shine a Light"	Archuleta, Miller, Balin	3:41
15.	"Aiming for Hope"	Archuleta, Mabey, Christiensen	3:42
16.	"A Little Goes a Long Way"	Archuleta, Cooley, Katie Herzig	3:29
Total length:			57:21

== Reception ==
The album debuted at No. 43 on the Billboard Independent Albums chart and peaked at number 40.

== Charts ==
Chart (2017)	Peak position
US Independent Albums (Billboard)	40
