= Forevermore (David Archuleta album) =

Studio album by David Archuleta
- Released: March 26, 2012
- Recorded: February 9–13, 2012
- Genre: Pop, OPM
- Length: 60:29
- Label: Ivory Music & Video

David Archuleta chronology
Glad Christmas Tidings (2011)	Forevermore (2012)	Begin (2012)

Singles from Forevermore
- 1. "Forevermore" Released: March 15, 2012; 2. "Nandito Ako" Released: March 15, 2012; 3. "I'll Never Go" Released: June 24, 2012; 4. "Rainbow (Remix)" Released: November 2012

Forevermore is the fourth studio album by American singer David Archuleta. The album is composed of covers of Filipino songs and was released on March 26, 2012, exclusively in the Philippines. This is Archuleta's first Original Pilipino Music (OPM) album.

The album was later released worldwide in late 2012.

== Album information ==
The album was released on March 26, 2012, under the exclusive licensee and distributor of Sony Music products in the Philippines, Ivory Music and Video. International fans are able to purchase the physical album from the official website of Archuleta or download them digitally from MyMusicStore International, a music store website based in the Philippines. The album became available on ITunes Stores worldwide on April 18, 2012, but was later removed from the store on April 23, for unknown reasons.

The album also contains four bonus tracks, including the song "Nandito Ako" from the mini-series of the same name.

The album received a Gold Record Award.

An expanded edition of the album came out in November 2012.

In 2012, Forevermore was certified gold in the Philippines.

== Singles ==
Both "Forevermore" and "Nandito Ako" were released both as official singles from the album, and became available as a digital download on March 15, 2012. "Forevermore" also received an official music video. Late in June, it was announced that "I'll Never Go" would be released as the album's second single. On June 11, Ivory Music & Video released a 33-second preview of the official music video for the song, which premiered on June 24.

== Track listing ==
No.	Title	Writer(s)	Producer(s)	Length
1.	"Forevermore"	Joey Benin	Jimmy Antiporda	4:50
2.	"Rainbow"	Jay Durias, Sharon Inductivo	Durias	5:26
3.	"I'll Never Go"	Frank Singcol	Antiporda	4:19
4.	"You Are My Song"	Louie Ocampo, Martin Nievera	Antiporda	4:04
5.	"Hold On"	Jocel Jimenez	Antiporda	4:49
6.	"Wherever You Are"	Vince Alaras	Durias	4:55
7.	"Maybe"	Antiporda, Jamie Rivera	Antiporda	4:36
8.	"Tell Me"	Ocampo, Alan Peter Ayque	Antiporda	3:49
9.	"Reaching Out"	Cecille Azarcon	Antiporda	3:54

Bonus tracks
No.	Title	Writer(s)	Producer(s)	Length
10.	"Nandito Ako"	Aaron Paul del Rosario	Durias	5:17
11.	"Forevermore" (minus-one)		Antiporda	4:50
12.	"I'll Never Go" (minus-one)		Antiporda	4:19
13.	"Rainbow" (minus-one)		Durias	5:23

Expanded edition bonus tracks
No.	Title	Writer(s)	Producer(s)	Length
10.	"Nandito Ako"	del Rosario	Durias	5:17
11.	"Rainbow (Remix)"	Durias, Inductivo
12.	"Forevermore" (minus-one)		Antiporda	4:50
13.	"I'll Never Go" (minus-one)		Antiporda	4:19
14.	"You Are My Song" (minus-one)		Antiporda
15.	"Hold On" (minus-one)		Antiporda
16.	"Maybe" (minus-one)		Antiporda
17.	"Tell Me" (minus-one)		Antiporda

Expanded edition bonus DVD
No.	Title	Length
1.	"Forevermore" (music video)
2.	"I'll Never Go" (music video)
3.	"Rainbow (Remix)" (music video)

Notes

- "Wherever You Are" and "Nandito Ako" are not included with the expanded edition release on streaming services.
