= Earthly Delights (EP) =

EP by David Archuleta
- Released: August 15, 2025
- Genre: Pop; R&B
- Length: 18:55
- Label: Archie Music
- Producer: Michael Blum

David Archuleta chronology
Therapy Sessions (2020)	Earthly Delights (2025)	My Only Wish (2025)

Singles from Earthly Delights
- 1. "Crème Brulée" Released: March 21, 2025; 2. "Can I Call You" Released: May 9, 2025; 3. "Dulce Amor" Released: August 12, 2025

Earthly Delights is an extended play (EP) by American singer-songwriter David Archuleta. It was self-released on August 15, 2025, through Archuleta's label Archie Music.

The album spawned three singles: "Crème Brulée", "Can I Call You", and "Dulce Amor". To further support the extended play, Archuleta started his concert tour, the Earthly Delights Tour which began on September 17, 2025.

== Background and release ==
On the EP, Archuleta explores themes of pleasure and pain, as well as sensuality, physicality, and heartbreak. Across the tracks, Archuleta embraces queerness and his new beginnings.

Archuleta characterized the extended play as a reflection on his process of embracing the sensual and sexual aspects of his identity, including behaviors he had previously suppressed due to his religious beliefs. He explained that allowing himself to experience sensual pleasure, which he had previously associated with moral transgression, helped him connect with more vulnerable and authentic parts of himself. According to Archuleta, the project symbolizes a rejection of his former fears surrounding "carnal" behavior and an acceptance of sensual experience as a natural and meaningful dimension of human life.

"I'm in my indulgence mode when it comes to giving into my sensuality. Something I always villainized before. There's something sweet about being naughty. And it's actually helped me to get in touch with more tender vulnerable parts of myself. So earthly delights is taking in the pleasures of what I always thought would keep me out of heaven. For the belief I always had of the hell and unhappiness I would experience for giving into my "carnal nature" of sexuality, which is the natural instinct of humans and even what leads to the source of life itself, here's to a big F you to my old fears and embracing the sensual side and earthly delights and how good and rich it feels. It really is the source to life."

— Archuleta explaining Earthly Delights, via LionhearTV

== Composition ==
The extended play comprises six tracks, all written by Archuleta in collaboration with Michael Blum, with additional contributions from Robyn Dell'Unto, Ryan Nealon, Noah Davis, Danielle Knibbe and Josie Dunne. Production was handled by Blum.

The deluxe edition includes five additional songs, bringing the total to eleven tracks. It features acoustic versions of "Crème Brulée" and "Can I Call You," a Haylee Wood remix of "Crème Brulée," and two new tracks: "Fade to Black," written by Archuleta, Nealon, Michael Cody Dear, Alexander Lewis, Jules Brave, and Ivan Jackson Rosenberg and produced by Lewis; and "Inside Out," written by Blum, Nealon, and Davis and produced by Blum.

== Promotion ==
The extended play spawned three singles. "Crème Brulée", released on March 24, 2025, served as the extended play lead single. It was followed by "Can I Call You" as the EP second single on May 9, 2025, and "Dulce Amor" as the third official single on August 12, 2025.

The EP was re-issued on August 15, 2025, featuring five songs, including two brand-new tracks.

== Reception ==
Professional ratings
Review scores
Source	Rating
The Musical Hype	4/5 stars

Earthly Delights was met with generally positive reviews from music critics, who praised Archuleta's honest, and confident songwriting but found some of the production too safe.

Writing for GLAAD, Yolanda Lenge dubbed the extended play as "personal, raw, and often playful". stating that "Archuleta invites listeners into that journey, and it's one filled with sweetness, sexiness, and sincere self-expression."

Jazz Williams of Pop Passion noted that the extended play leans into R&B, a style that according the writer "really suits his voice.". Williams identified "Crème Brûlée" and "Can I Call You" as the strongest productions on the project, while still responding positively to the remaining tracks, commenting that the minimal production renders them "more chill and easy on the ears."

== Track listing ==
Earthly Delights track listing
No.	Title	Writer(s)	Producer(s)	Length
1.	"Give You the World"	David Archuleta; Michael Blum; Jordan Shulman	Michael Blum	3:26
2.	"Crème Brulée"	Archuleta; Blum; Robyn Dell'Unto; Ryan Nealon	Blum	3:00
3.	"Can I Call You"	Archuleta; Blum; Noah Davis	Blum	3:36
4.	"Lucky"	David Archuleta; Michael Blum; Noah Davis; Ryan Nealon	Blum; Archuleta	3:16
5.	"Home"	Archuleta; Danielle Knibbe; Ryan Nealon	Blum; Barbra Lica; Ben Whiteley	2:57
6.	"Dulce Amor"	Archuleta; Dell'Unto; Josie Dunne; Nealon	Michael Blum	3:20
Total length:				18:55

Earthly Delights (Deluxe Edition)
No.	Title	Writer(s)	Producer(s)	Length
7.	"Fade to Black"	David Archuleta; Michael Cody Dear; Alexander Lewis; Ryan Nealon; Jules Brave; Ivan Jackson Rosenberg	Alexander Lewis	2:56
8.	"Inside Out"	Michael Blum; Ryan Nealon; Noah Davis	Michael Blum	3:07
9.	"Crème Brulée (acoustic)"	David Archuleta; Michael Blum; Robyn Dell'Unto; Ryan Nealon	Michael Blum	3:17
10.	"Can I Call You (acoustic)"	David Archuleta; Michael Blum; Noah Davis	Michael Blum	3:41
11.	"Crème Brulée (Haylee Wood Remix)"	David Archuleta; Michael Blum; Robyn Dell'Unto; Ryan Nealon	Michael Blum	2:56
Total length:				35:25

== Release history ==
Earthly Delights release history
Region	Date	Format(s)	Label	Ref.
Various	August 15, 2025	Digital download; streaming	Archie Music	
