= Winter in the Air =

Studio album by David Archuleta
- Released: November 2, 2018
- Genre: Christmas
- Label: Shadow Mountain

David Archuleta chronology
Postcards in the Sky (2017)	Winter in the Air (2018)	Therapy Sessions (2020)

Singles from Winter in the Air
- 1. "Christmas Every Day" Released: October 22, 2018

Winter in the Air is the seventh studio album and second Christmas album by David Archuleta, released on November 2, 2018. A deluxe edition was released on November 14, 2019, which included three bonus tracks "The Christmas Song", "Merry Christmas, Happy Holidays", and "Still, Still, Still (A capella)"

== Background and promotion ==
Archuleta started work on the album in January, while the weather was still cold in his new hometown of Nashville. In an interview with Radio.com, Archuleta revealed that he wanted to write "one of each kind of Christmas song" meaning they had to either be fun, spiritual, or wintry. This led to the creation of "Christmas Every Day", "He Is Born", and the title track "Winter in the Air".

The album was supported with a Winter in the Air Tour that began November 26 in Los Angeles and ran through December 21 in Richfield, Utah.

== Track listing ==
No.	Title	Writer(s)	Length
1.	"Christmas Every Day"	David Archuleta; Cason Cooley; Dave Barnes	3:39
2.	"God Rest Ye Merry Gentlemen"		2:36
3.	"Mary's Boy Child"	Jester Hairston	3:26
4.	"Some Children See Him"	Alfred S. Burt	3:12
5.	"Holly Jolly Christmas"	Johnny Marks	2:13
6.	"O Come, O Come Emmanuel"		4:23
7.	"He Is Born"	Archuleta; Cooley; Isabeau Miller	4:36
8.	"White Christmas"	Irving Berlin	3:53
9.	"Mary, Did You Know?"	Mark Lowry; Buddy Greene	2:56
10.	"Winter in the Air"	Archuleta; Jeremy Bose; Cindy Morgan	3:54
11.	"In the Bleak Midwinter"	Christina Rossetti	3:45
12.	"Glorious"	Stephanie Mabey	3:02

Deluxe edition
No.	Title	Writer(s)	Length
13.	"The Christmas Song"	Robert Wells; Mel Tormé	3:27
14.	"Merry Christmas, Happy Holidays"	Veit Renn; Vincent Degiorgio; Joshua S. Chasez; Justin Timberlake	4:09
15.	"Still, Still, Still (A cappella)"		2:12

== Charts ==
Chart (2018)	Peak position
US Billboard 200	191
US Top Holiday Albums (Billboard)	6
US Christian Albums (Billboard)	9
