= No Matter How Far =

Compilation album by David Archuleta
- Released: March 26, 2013
- Genre: Pop
- Length: 38:22
- Label: Entertainment One

David Archuleta chronology
Begin (2012)	No Matter How Far (2013)	Postcards in the Sky (2017)

Singles from No Matter How Far
- 1. "Don't Run Away" Released: February 12, 2013

No Matter How Far is a compilation album by American singer David Archuleta. It is composed of ten tracks which feature a mix of previously unreleased U.S. songs and new material like "Don't Run Away" and "Heart Falls Out". Its lead single, "Don't Run Away", was released on February 12, 2013.

== Information ==
The album was released on March 26, 2013, under the license of Entertainment One. It consists of one U.S. unreleased song titled "Nothing Else Better to Do", seven compiled songs from previous albums' The Other Side of Down: Asian Tour Edition and Philippines' exclusive release Forevermore and two new songs: "Don't Run Away" and "Heart Falls Out". On March 22, 2013, the website Billboard released an exclusive preview of the full album. A music video for its carrier song "Don't Run Away" created by the artist Kylie Malchus was released on March 25.

== Track listing ==
No.	Title	Writer(s)	Producer(s)	Length
1.	"Nothing Else Better to Do"	David Archuleta, Emanuel Kiriakou, Andre Merritt & Lindy Robbins	Kiriakou	3:26
2.	"Everything and More"	Archuleta, Victoria Horn & Matt Squire	John Hancock	3:55
3.	"Don't Run Away"	Archuleta, The Nexus (David Sneddon and James Bauer-Mein)	The Nexus	3:37
4.	"Tell Me"	Louie Ocampo, Alan Peter Ayque	Jimmy Antiporda	3:52
5.	"Love Don't Hate"	Archuleta, Joy Williams, Jesse Frasure, Cary Barlowe	Hancock	3:17
6.	"Wait"	Archuleta, Josh "Igloo" Monroy, Nate Campany	Monroy	3:13
7.	"Heart Falls Out"	Archuleta, Squire, Horn	Squire	3:37
8.	"Notice Me"	Archuleta, Williams, Matt Bronleewe, Andrew Fromm	Bronleewe	3:46
9.	"I'll Never Go"	Frank Singcol	Antiporda	4:19
10.	"Forevermore"	Joey Benin	Antiporda	4:48
Total length:				38:22

== Reception ==
The album debuted at No. 110 on Billboard 200 chart.

== Charts ==
Chart performance for No Matter How Far
Chart (2013)	Peak position
US Billboard 200	110
US Independent Albums (Billboard)	23
