= Nandito Ako (TV series) =

- Title card
- Genre: Drama
- Created by: TV5 Network
- Written by: Renato Custodio, Jr. Charlotte Dianco; Renei Dimla; Evie Macapugay
- Directed by: Mac C. Alejandre
- Starring: David Archuleta; Jasmine Curtis; Eula Caballero
- Theme music composer: Aaron Paul del Rosario and Ogie Alcasid
- Opening theme: "Nandito Ako" by David Archuleta
- Country of origin: Philippines
- Original language: Filipino
- No. of episodes: 25

Production
- Running time: 30-45 minutes

Original release
- Network: TV5
- Release: February 20 – March 23, 2012

Nandito Ako (English: Here I Am) is a 2012 Philippine television drama series broadcast by TV5. Directed by Mac C. Alejandre, it stars David Archuleta, Jasmine Curtis and Eula Caballero. It aired from February 20 to March 23, 2012, replacing P. S. I Love You.

The programme was the second Mini Serye by TV5, and like the first one, Sa Ngalan ng Ina (lit. In the Name of the Mother), it was also set to air for only a month.

== Synopsis ==
International singing star Josh Bradley is a Filipino-American who was born and raised in the Philippines. When he was six years old, he was separated from his mother, Cara, during a hotel fire, who was believed to have died. After the incident, Josh moved to the United States, beginning his musical career. Years later, Josh returns to the Philippines to find out what really happened to his mother and search for the little girl he encountered and befriended during the hotel fire.

== Cast and characters ==
=== Main cast ===
| Cast | Character | Character Information |
|---|---|---|
| David Archuleta | Josh Bradley | A Filipino-American who was born in the Philippines but grew up in the United States and became an international artist. He returns to the Philippines, later finding out and believing that his mother, Cara, had died in a fire when he was six years old. This all changed when his mother's friend, Mylene, informs him that his mother is still alive. He understands Tagalog but has limited command of the language. |
| Jasmine Curtis-Smith | Epifania "Anya" Dionisio | Daughter of Teresa Dionisio and later Josh Bradley's love interest. Anya at first rejected Josh's love, afraid that Holly will get mad at her. She first met Josh in the hotel fire in 1996, where he saved her life. She is revealed to have Josh's broken wristwatch. |
| Eula Caballero | Holly Posadas | Coming from a rich family, Holly wants to live up to the high expectations of her stepmother, Margareth, who seems ever displeased with her stepdaughter's actions. She and Anya had a rocky start, but eventually became friends because the latter helped her out through several unfortunate events. She is a fan of Josh Bradley whom she later met on a date. Holly is eventually diagnosed with brain cancer towards the end of the series and dies, leaving Josh and Anya to live happily ever after. |
| G. Toengi | Cara "Aguilar" Bradley | Josh Bradley's mother who he thought had perished in the 1996 hotel fire. Years later, her friend Mylene reveals to an older Josh that Cara had in fact survived the disaster. |
| Gelli de Belen | Teresa Dionisio | Anya Dionisio's mother, who was a former "Guest Relations Officer" at Clark Air Base, where she met American officer Mark Watson and bore Anya. They were about to leave for the United States when they were caught in the hotel fire, causing Mark's death. Teresa has since returned to her former job while raising Anya. |
| Aiko Melendez | Margareth Posadas | Holly's wicked stepmother. She always treated Holly with disdain while exhibiting excessive pride in her eldest daughter, Audrey. She became very strict with Holly after her husband, Jaime, left them because she loved Holly more than him. |

=== Extended cast ===
| Cast | Character | Character Information |
|---|---|---|
| Joseph Bitangcol | Mando Batongbakal | Anya's childhood friend, who secretly loves her. |
| Alwyn Uytingco | Billy Parsons | Josh Bradley's best friend. |
| Ana Capri | Mylene | Cara's best friend who told Josh that his mother is still alive. |
| Byron Ortile | Aladdin Dionisio | Anya's younger half-brother. |
| Mon Confiado | Pablito | Josh Bradley's driver |
| David Bianco | Steve Bradley | Josh's uncle. He was the one who told and made Josh believe that his mother died in the fire incident. He constantly tries to control Josh. |
| Ana Feleo | Chit Enriquez | Josh Bradley's road manager |
| RS Francisco | Volta | Teresa's best friend and godmother to Anya. Owns a small hair salon. |
| Perla Bautista | Yaya Rosa | Housekeeper of the Posadas family. |

=== Guest cast / special appearance ===
| Cast | Character | Character Information |
|---|---|---|
| Andrea Brillantes | Young Anya | She played as young Anya. |
| Jay Durias | Himself | He played the keys on Josh Bradley's concert in Manila. |
| Gio Salvador | Mark Watson | Anya's father. He is an American soldier who left Anya and Teresa when Anya was still very young. A few years after he left Teresa's family, he returned to them and apologized for leaving, telling them that he would take them to the states and live there. However, it never happened because he died in the hotel fire tragedy. |
| Lucky Mark Mercado | Gerald | Holly and Anya's classmate. He has a bad character. Once, he, together with Holly's friends, framed her for possession of marijuana, which caused her trouble. He also tried to molest Anya by tricking her to tutor him and spiking her juice drink with sleeping powder. But before he even got to his attempt to harass Anya, Holly confronted him and took Anya away with her. |
| Mae "Juana Change" Paner | Aling Tasing | Neighbor of the Dionisios and is in conflict with them. |
| Jay Austria | Lantoy | Son of Tasing. |
| Morissette | Denise | Anya's close friend. |
| Antonette Garcia | Aling Baby | She owns the house which the Dionisios rent. |
| | Jaime | Margareth's husband who left his family because he had an affair with Teresa. |
| Joe Summers | Harold Bradley | Josh's father and younger brother of Steve. Died in a bar fight trying to help Cara and her friends. He appears in episode 13 in Steve's flashback. |
| | Emil | Cara's husband and Josh's stepfather, first appears in episode 16. He lived with Cara in Batangas and was the reason Cara didn't go to Manila to find Josh, since he was sick and she had to take care of him. |

== Trivia ==
- The theme song of the mini-soap opera with the same title was originally performed by singer-songwriter Ogie Alcasid and later remade by Mexican diva, Thalia.
- Gelli de Belen and Aiko Melendez both worked in the series. However, their husbands Ariel Rivera and Jomari Yllana (Aiko's ex-husband) recently worked in ABS-CBN's E-Boy respectively.
- This is David Archuleta's first Filipino and only Asian TV project.

== See also ==
- List of TV5 (Philippine TV network) original programming
