= The Other Side of Down =

Studio album by David Archuleta
- Released: October 5, 2010
- Length: 41:58
- Label: Jive; 19
- Producer: Mitch Allan; A. Ander; Danielle Brisebois; Jeremy Bose; Mike Compass; Chris DeStefano; Emanuel Kiriakou; S*A*M and Sluggo; Matt Squire

David Archuleta chronology
| Christmas from the Heart (2009) | The Other Side of Down (2010) | Glad Christmas Tidings (2011) |

Alternative cover
- The Other Side of Down - Asian Tour Edition artwork

Singles from The Other Side of Down
- 1. "Something 'Bout Love" Released: July 20, 2010; 2. "Elevator" Released: September 14, 2010 (radio); 3. "Falling Stars" Released: October 29, 2010 (radio)

Singles from Asian Tour Edition
- 1. "Everything & More" Released: July 2011 (radio); 2. "Wait" Released: December 25, 2011

The Other Side of Down is the third studio album by American singer David Archuleta. It was released on October 5, 2010, through Jive Records. A follow-up to his 2009 Christmas album Christmas from the Heart, Archuleta worked with several producers on material for the album, including Emanuel Kiriakou, Mitch Allan, Danielle Brisebois, S*A*M and Sluggo, and Matt Squire. He co-wrote ten of the album's twelve tracks to create a more personal album reflecting his experiences and artistic growth.

The album received generally positive reviews, with critics praising its vocals, catchy pop production, and upbeat mood, though some noted it was not particularly innovative. It debuted at number 13 on the US Billboard 200 with 24,000 first-week sales and had sold 63,000 copies by February 2011. The Other Side of Down was promoted in Southeast Asia by Asian Tour, which began in July 2011. Lead single "Something 'Bout Love" failed to reach the US Billboard Hot 100. It was Archuleta's final album for Jive.

== Background ==
In June 2008, after he finished as the runner-up on the seventh season of American Idol, Archuleta signed with Jive Records and 19 Recordings and began work on his debut album. His 2008 self-titled debut went on to sell 762,000 copies domestically, according to Nielsen SoundScan, with breakout single "Crush," which has sold 1.9 million, peaking at number two on the US Billboard Hot 100. After that, he released the holiday album Christmas From the Heart, which sold 246,000 copies, and worked on his book Chords of Strength: A Memoir of Soul, Song, and the Power of Perseverance, published in June.

For his next release, Archuleta tapped "Crush" writers Emanuel Kiriakou and Dave Hodges, who contributed two songs, as well as co-writers Sam Hollander and Dave Katz, among others. Archuleta said that his goal with the album was to make it as representative of himself as possible. He co-wrote on ten of the album's twelve tracks and explained that he wanted to introduce listeners to his goofy, dorky, and somewhat weird personality. While his first album featured many strong pop songs, he felt that this album was far more personal. He further commented: "Most of the songs on the album represent thoughts and experiences that I've personally gone through. I hope this album helps people understand more of where I'm coming from as an artist and as a person. It's about moving forward in life, making progress in accomplishing your goals and dreams while appreciating what life has given you."

== Promotion ==
"Something 'Bout Love" was released as the album's lead single. Previewed via Archuleta's official mobile fan club on June 28, 2010, it was made available for streaming exclusively on Archuleta's official website on July 1, before being officially released as a digital download on July 20, 2010. "Elevator" was announced in early September to be the album's second single. It was released to airplay on September 14, 2010. "Falling Stars" was released as a radio single on October 29, 2010, serving as the last single from the main edition of The Other Side of Down. "Everything & More" was released on a radio station in Singapore, serving as a promotional single from The Other Side of Down: Asian Tour Edition, the re-release of the album. A music video for "Wait", one of the bonus tracks from the reissue, was shot in Hong Kong on November 2, 2011, and premiered on Channel V on Christmas Day 2011. It was made available on YouTube by Channel V on December 29, one day after Archuleta's 21st birthday.

== Release ==
The Other Side of Down was originally scheduled for release on September 14, 2010, but was later postponed to October 5, 2010. On that date, it was released in the United States under Jive Records in three formats: a standard CD edition, a deluxe CD+DVD edition, and a fan edition exclusive to Archuleta's official website. The fan edition included the deluxe CD+DVD, a 4×6-inch picture window, four high-quality photographs of Archuleta presented as two double-sided 4×6-inch prints, one hand-initialed photo, and an album-exclusive friendship bracelet. All items were packaged in a deluxe 7×7-inch memory box. Fans who pre-ordered the fan edition also received an instant MP3 download of the album’s lead single, "Something 'Bout Love," as well as automatic entry into a contest to win an HD Flip Video camera containing exclusive footage of Archuleta.

The deluxe edition DVD features four videos: an album photoshoot, a Q&A session, the music video for "Something 'Bout Love," and a behind-the-scenes feature on the making of the video. While Archuleta was touring Asia, the album was re-released in a repackaged edition titled The Other Side of Down: Asian Tour Edition. Released exclusively in Asia on July 19, 2011, the edition featured four new tracks in addition to the previously released song "Zero Gravity." It also introduced a new logo, a new photoshoot by Matt Clayton, a lyric booklet, and a DVD containing karaoke versions of four of Archuleta's songs.

== Critical reception ==
Professional ratings
Review scores
| Source | Rating |
|---|---|
| AllMusic | 3/5 stars |
| Entertainment Weekly | B |

Critical reception for The Other Side of Down was generally positive. Entertainment Weekly's Mikael Wood gave the album a B, praising Stomping the Roses and Elevator and stating that "[Archuleta's] vocals gleam with dewy naïveté". Writing for The Stanford Daily, Ashley Rhoades felt that "while The Other Side of Down is not the most inventive pop record ever made, it is a high-quality, aesthetically appealing release that is guaranteed to put you in a great mood." Krita Coelho, writing for Gulf News, called the album "diverse, but at the same time, structured. Cool guitar patterns and dance beats makes this album fun to listen to. Worth a try!" Stephen Thomas Erlewine of AllMusic gave the album a mixed review, stating "Archuleta certainly is a follower, not an innovator, but he's sharp enough to hire collaborators to coax comfortable commercial pop out of him — something that is much more difficult than it appears." He gave the album 3 stars out of 5.

== Commercial performance ==
The Other Side of Down sold 24,000 copies in its first week of its release, debuting at number thirteen on the US Billboard 200 chart. In Canada, the album peaked at number 68 on the Canadian Albums Chart. By February 2011, it had sold a total of 63,000 copies, according to Nielsen SoundScan. A far cry from his 2008 self-titled debut, Archuleta was dropped from Jive Records and 19 Recordings that same month.

== Track listing ==
The Other Side of Down track listing
| No. | Title | Writer(s) | Producer(s) | Length |
|---|---|---|---|---|
| 1. | "The Other Side of Down" | David Archuleta; Joy Williams; Blair Daly; Jeremy Bose | Bose | 3:13 |
| 2. | "Something 'Bout Love" | Archuleta; Chris DeStefano; Dave Katz; Sam Hollander | S*A*M and Sluggo; DeStefano | 4:22 |
| 3. | "Elevator" | Archuleta; Mike Krompass; Shelly Peiken | Krompass | 3:24 |
| 4. | "Stomping the Roses" | Archuleta; Bryce Avary | Krompass | 3:01 |
| 5. | "Who I Am" | Archuleta; Krompass; Peiken | Krompass | 3:44 |
| 6. | "Falling Stars" | Claude Kelly; Emanuel Kiriakou; Jess Cates | Kiriakou | 3:35 |
| 7. | "Parachutes and Airplanes" | Archuleta; Lindy Robbins; Matt Squire | Squire | 3:33 |
| 8. | "Look Around" | Archuleta; Victoria Horn | Squire | 3:26 |
| 9. | "Good Place" | Archuleta; Peiken; Mitch Allan | Allan | 3:25 |
| 10. | "Complain" | Kelly; Kiriakou; David Hodges | Kiriakou | 3:24 |
| 11. | "Things Are Gonna Get Better" | Archuleta; Danielle Brisebois; Nick Lashley; Alex Ander | Brisebois; Lashley; Ander | 3:14 |
| 12. | "My Kind of Perfect" | Archuleta; Williams; Cindy Brouwer; Bose | Bose | 3:37 |
| Total length: | | | | 41:58 |

US iTunes Store pre-order and Korean digital bonus track
| No. | Title | Writer(s) | Producer(s) | Length |
|---|---|---|---|---|
| 13. | "The Day After Tomorrow" | Archuleta; Horn | Squire | 3:20 |

Japanese edition bonus track
| No. | Title | Writer(s) | Producer(s) | Length |
|---|---|---|---|---|
| 13. | "Nothing Else Better to Do" | Archuleta; Kiriakou; Andre Merritt; Lindy Robbins | Kiriakou | 3:27 |

Asian tour edition bonus tracks
| No. | Title | Writer(s) | Producer(s) | Length |
|---|---|---|---|---|
| 13. | "Zero Gravity" | Archuleta; Gerrard; Krompass; Diamond | Krompass; Steve Diamond^{[a]} | 3:28 |
| 14. | "Love Don't Hate" | Archuleta; Cary Barlowe; Jesse Frasure; Joy Williams | John Hancock | 3:17 |
| 15. | "Everything & More" | Archuleta; Horn; Squire | Squire | 3:55 |
| 16. | "Notice Me" | Archuleta; Andrew Fromm; Williams; Matt Bronleewe | | 3:45 |
| 17. | "Wait" | Archuleta; Josh Monroy; Nate Campany | | 3:13 |

Deluxe edition bonus DVD
| No. | Title | Length |
|---|---|---|
| 1. | "Photo Shoot (Behind the Scenes)" | 4:42 |
| 2. | "Something 'Bout Love (Music Video Behind the Scenes)" | 4:08 |
| 3. | "Interview Q&A with David" | 11:04 |
| 4. | "Something 'Bout Love (Music Video)" | 3:57 |
| 5. | "Photo Gallery" (not on digital release) | 1:04 |

Asian tour edition bonus DVD
| No. | Title | Length |
|---|---|---|
| 1. | "Crush" (karaoke) |
| 2. | "A Little Too Not Over You" (karaoke) |
| 3. | "Touch My Hand" (karaoke) |
| 4. | "Something 'Bout Love" (karaoke) |

Notes

- ^{^[a]} denotes co-producer(s)

== Charts ==
Weekly performance for The Other Side of Down
| Chart (2010) | Peak position |
|---|---|
| Canadian Albums (Nielsen SoundScan) | 68 |
| US Billboard 200 | 13 |

== Release history ==
The Other Side of Down release history
| Region | Date | Edition | Format | Label | Ref. |
|---|---|---|---|---|---|
| Various | October 5, 2010 | Standard | CD; digital download | Jive; 19 | |
| Various | July 19, 2011 | Asian Tour Edition reissue | CD; digital download; DVD | Jive; 19 | |
