= Therapy Sessions =

Studio album by David Archuleta
- Released: May 20, 2020
- Genre: Pop
- Length: 32:55
- Label: Archie Music

David Archuleta chronology
Winter in the Air (2018)	Therapy Sessions (2020)	Earthly Delights (2025)

Singles from Therapy Sessions
- 1. "Paralyzed" Released: August 27, 2019; 2. "Ok, All Right" Released: March 27, 2020; 3. "Switch" Released: October 22, 2020

Therapy Sessions is the eighth studio album by American singer David Archuleta. It is composed of ten original tracks and was released on May 20, 2020. Its first single, "Paralyzed", was released on August 27, 2019, followed by "Ok, All Right" on March 27, 2020.

== Background ==
Archuleta began work on Therapy Sessions as a result of his very own, which had him fighting a lot of worries and negativity that he had been feeling towards himself. Billboard described Therapy Sessions as "arguably, his most honest chapter yet".

== Track listing ==
Therapy Sessions track listing
No.	Title	Writer(s)	Length
1.	"Paralyzed"	David Archuleta, Isabeau Miller, Nate Dodge	3:19
2.	"You Worry"	Archuleta, Samuel Brennan, Victoria Horn	3:36
3.	"Ok, All Right"	Archuleta, Chantry Johnson	2:54
4.	"Patient"	Archuleta, Johnson, Kyle Neal	2:54
5.	"Need"	Archuleta, Brennan, Horn	2:58
6.	"Brave"	Archuleta, Si Hulbert, Horn	3:56
7.	"Good in the Bad"	Archuleta, Horn	3:17
8.	"Switch"	Archuleta, Johnson, Tony Ferrari	3:25
9.	"Just Breathe"	Archuleta, Miller, Dodge	3:37
10.	"Future Self"	Archuleta, Hulbert, Horn	2:55
Total length:			32:55

The Lost Sessions
No.	Title	Writer(s)	Length
11.	"9 Years Old"	Archuleta, Miller, Cason Cooley	3:04
12.	"Therapy"	Archuleta, Horn	3:28
Total length:			39:29

== Charts ==
Chart performance for Therapy Sessions
Chart (2020)	Peak position
US Top Current Album Sales (Billboard)	60

== Accolades ==
Therapy Sessions was a finalist for the 2021 AML Award for lyrics.
