= Begin (David Archuleta album) =

Studio album by David Archuleta
- Released: August 7, 2012
- Length: 45:01
- Label: Highway
- Producer: Kurt Bestor; John Hancoc

David Archuleta chronology
Forevermore (2012)	Begin (2012)	No Matter How Far (2013)

Singles from Begin
- 1. "Broken" Released: July 31, 2012

Begin (stylized as BEGIN.) is the fifth studio album by American singer David Archuleta. It was released August 7, 2012 under the Deseret Book's label Highway Records, a subsidiary of Shadow Mountain. Composed of nine cover songs and one original track, it debuted and peaked at number 28 on the US Billboard 200 chart.

== Background ==
The album consists of ten tracks, nine of which are cover songs by Archuleta and one of them, titled "Broken" is an entirely new song co-written and sung by Archuleta himself. Archuleta said about the album "I wanted to still be able to give people an idea of what it's like for me and find songs that they can connect with as well." A music video for the song "Everybody Hurts" was released on August 23. The video was directed by Jed Wells and features footage from Archuleta recording the song in the studio the day before he left on his mission.

== Critical reception ==
Professional ratings
Review scores
Source	Rating
AllMusic	2.5/5 stars
Recording Radio Film Connection	3.5/5 stars
The Salt Lake Tribune	C
The Washington Times	2/5 stars

AllMusic editor Stephen Thomas Erlewine wrote that Archuleta "performs with a professional aplomb exuding sincerity, yet manages to skirt any deep emotion. It is an album not meant to surprise, it is meant to comfort, meant to please those already pledging allegiance to Archuleta's sugary ways [...] It is an album that is meant to be released on a small label which knows precisely how to deliver to a preordained audience of the devoted." Entertainment Tonight felt that "Archuleta provides his audience with an album filled with inspirational songs. His sweet and charming personality continues to emanate as he progresses as a musical artist. For those who admire Archuleta or are new to his talents, Begin is the new album which will help bring hope and an appreciation for the singer."

Writing for The Salt Lake Tribune, David Burger remarked that on Begin, "Archuleta's delicate vocals are overwhelmed by over-the-top, overproduced arrangements. The American Idol finalist's voice is so good that he can bring emotion to the songs, rather than relying on 76 trombones (not to mention dated synths) to spoon-feed a listener. The result is off-putting, rather than inspiring." Andrew Leahey from The Washington Post found that "after taking a few stabs at mainstream pop music, Mr. Archuleta smartly plays to his strengths on his fourth album. There's absolutely nothing dangerous or edgy about Begin, a mild-mannered collection of cover songs that showcase his vocals. He soars, swoons and croons in all the right places, and his vibrato would make a Broadway singer jealous. What this record lacks is any real demonstration of emotion, though."

== Commercial performance ==
Begin sold around 11,000 copies in its first week and debuted at number 28 on the US Billboard 200 chart. It also reached number five on Billboard's Independent Albums chart.

== Track listing ==
Begin track listing
No.	Title	Writer(s)	Original artist(s)	Length
1.	"Beautiful"	Linda Perry	Christina Aguilera	3:59
2.	"Somewhere Only We Know"	Tim Rice-Oxley; Tom Chaplin; Richard Hughes	Keane	3:52
3.	"Everybody Hurts"	Michael Stipe; Mike Mills; Peter Buck; Bill Berry	R.E.M.	4:53
4.	"Don't Give Up" (featuring Libby Linton)	Peter Gabriel	Gabriel & Kate Bush	5:35
5.	"Angel"	Sarah McLachlan	McLachlan	4:37
6.	"Bridge over Troubled Water"	Paul Simon	Simon & Garfunkel	5:06
7.	"Broken"	Jon Hunt; David Archuleta	David Archuleta	4:29
8.	"True Colors"	Tom Kelly; Billy Steinberg	Cyndi Lauper	3:39
9.	"Pride (In the Name of Love)"	Bono	U2	3:52
10.	"Be Still, My Soul"	Jean Sibelius	Sibelius	4:59
Total length:				45:01

== Charts ==
Weekly performance for Begin
Chart (2012)	Peak position
US Billboard 200	28
US Independent Albums (Billboard)	5

== Release history ==
Begin release history
Region	Date	Date	Ref.
United States	August 7, 2012	Highway Records	
Canada	August 7, 2012	Highway Records	
Philippines	August 25, 2012	Ivory Records	
Taiwan	August 28, 2012	Sony Music	
Malaysia	September 4, 2012	Sony Music	
