= David Archuleta =

American singer-songwriter (born 1990)

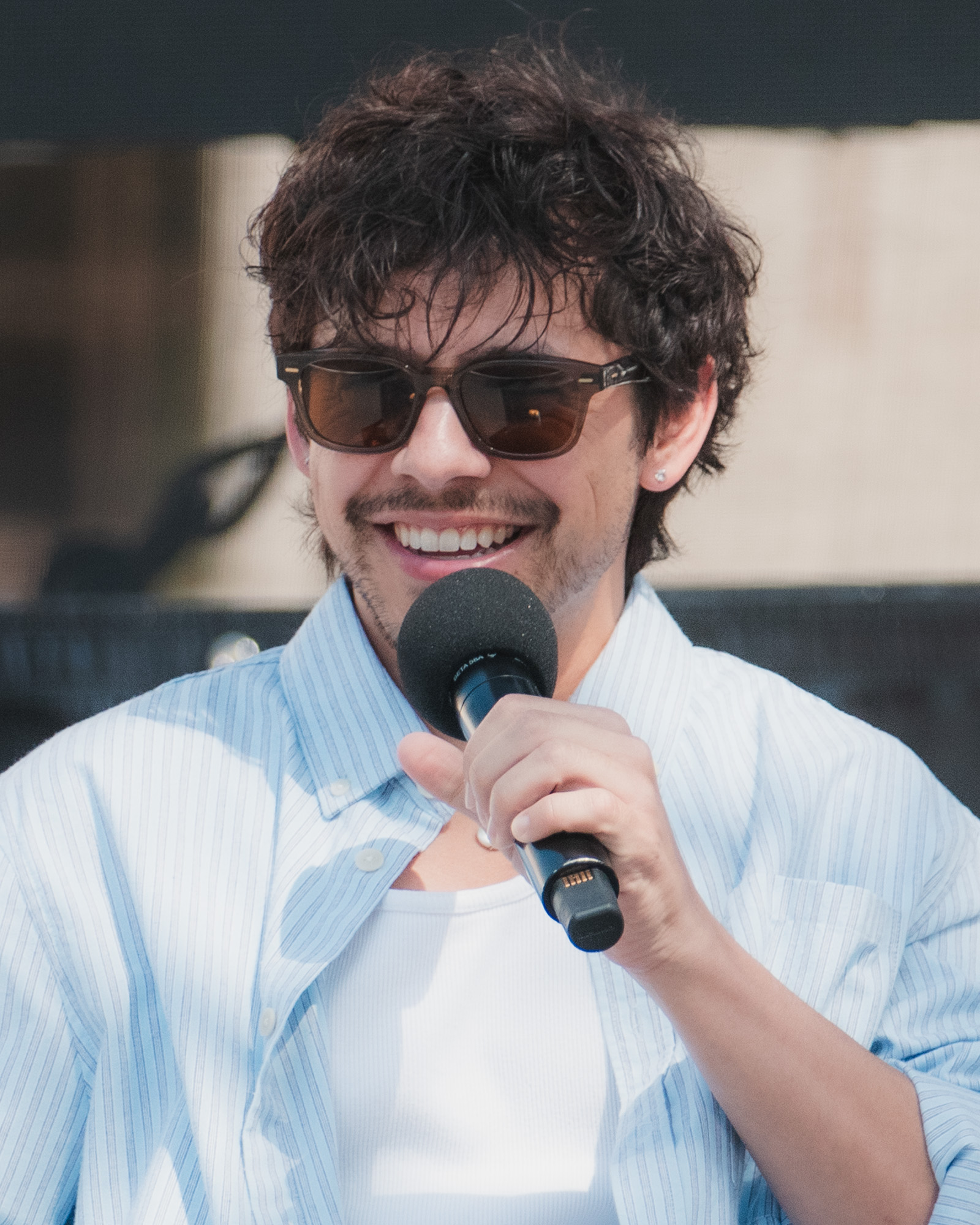
- Archuleta in 2026

Background information
- Born: David James Archuleta; December 28, 1990 (age 35); Miami, Florida, U.S.
- Origin: Murray, Utah
- Genre: Pop
- Occupations: Singer; songwriter; musician
- Instruments: Vocals; piano
- Years active: 2003–present
- Labels: Jive; Shadow Mountain; Ivory; Highway; E1 Music; Archie Music; Tone Tree Music
- Website: davidarchuleta.com

David James Archuleta (born December 28, 1990) is an American singer and songwriter. At the age of ten, he won the children's division of the Utah Talent Competition, leading to other television singing appearances. When he was twelve years old, he became the Junior Vocal Champion on the second season of Star Search, known as "Star Search 2". In 2008, he finished second on the seventh season of American Idol.

In August 2008, Archuleta released his first single, "Crush". His self-titled first album, released three months later, debuted at number two on the Billboard 200 chart; it has sold over 750,000 copies in the United States and over 900,000 worldwide. In October 2010, he released a third album, The Other Side of Down, featuring the lead single "Something 'Bout Love". In March 2012, he released his fourth album, Forevermore, exclusively in the Philippines. This was his first Original Filipino Music (OPM) album, composed of several covers of Filipino songs. The album was certified gold in the Philippines (10,000 units) as of June 2012.

His fifth album, Begin, was released in August 2012. A compilation album, No Matter How Far, was released in March 2013. His sixth studio album, Postcards in the Sky, was released in October 2017 and his second holiday album, Winter in the Air, was released in 2018. His eighth studio album, Therapy Sessions, was released in May 2020.

== Early life ==
Archuleta was born on December 28, 1990, in Miami, Florida, to Guadalupe Mayorga, a salsa singer and dancer, and Jeff Archuleta, a jazz musician. His mother is from Honduras and his father is of Spanish, Danish, Irish, and German descent. Archuleta has stated that his surname is of Basque origin. He speaks fluent Spanish and has four siblings. His family moved to the Salt Lake City suburb of Sandy, Utah, when he was six years old.

Archuleta began singing at the age of six, inspired by a Les Misérables video. "That musical is what started all of this", he said. He started performing publicly at the age of 10 when he participated in the Utah Talent Competition, singing "I Will Always Love You" by Dolly Parton; he won the Child Division. He attended Murray High School before appearing on American Idol.

Archuleta was a member of the Boy Scouts of America and completed the final requirements to achieve the rank of Eagle Scout in 2008, three days shy of his 18th birthday, while competing in American Idol; he did not formally receive the rank until two years later.

He is a graduate of Barbizon Modeling and Acting School in Salt Lake City.

== Music career ==
=== 2003–2006: Star Search and musical beginnings ===
In 2003, Archuleta sang on several episodes of the television show Star Search. He wound up as the Junior Vocal Champion on Star Search 2, losing the Junior Grand Champion title to Tiffany Evans. On one episode, he competed against then-11-year-old Alexandréa Lushington, who became a top 20 semi-finalist on American Idol alongside Archuleta. Around the second year of being on Star Search he started focusing on the lyrics, "I didn't even pay attention to the lyrics when I was 12, 13."

Archuleta's competing on Star Search was preceded by an appearance on The Jenny Jones Show, meeting the finalists from American Idol's first season, for whom he performed a spontaneous a cappella rendition of "And I Am Telling You I'm Not Going" from Dreamgirls. He received praise from Season 1 winner Kelly Clarkson, and the episode led to appearances on CBS's The Early Show. The year after Star Search, he found out he had partial vocal paralysis but declined risky surgery and later said he was 'almost fully recovered'. He limited his singing to specific occasions, like Stadium of Fire, the Independence Day celebration at Brigham Young University Stadium.

Archuleta made initial attempts at songwriting and arranging music after his Star Search experience and has written at least three songs. His first singles in 2002 were "Dream Sky High", written by his father and Sunny Hilden, and "Don't Tell Me", written by Yani Gileadi.

=== 2007–2008: American Idol and David Archuleta ===
Archuleta auditioned at the San Diego tryouts, held at Qualcomm Stadium at the end of July 2007, with a performance of John Mayer's "Waiting on the World to Change". He received three 'Yes' votes from the judging panel - with judge Randy Jackson spontaneously joining in to sing background vocals - and received a 'Golden Ticket' to the Hollywood auditions. He was sixteen during the Hollywood auditions and attended school while a part of American Idol's seventh season. A parent was required to be there because he was a minor. Archuleta was put through to the live finals.

He took advantage of the decision to allow contestants to play musical instruments when he accompanied himself on piano for his performances of "Crazy", "Another Day in Paradise", and "Angels".

During the 1970s themed week Archuleta sang the John Lennon song "Imagine", omitting the earlier verses in favor of the last one. Los Angeles Times columnist Ann Powers speculated that he wanted to avoid singing "no religion too" because of his faith. "As a Mormon, he's unlikely to espouse the song's agnostic ideal", she wrote. However, he had previously sung the entire song on "Good Things Utah" when he was 13. Asked by judge Randy Jackson why he did not sing the first verse, Archuleta said the third verse was his favorite because it has "a great message".

After his performance of "We Can Work It Out", which judge Simon Cowell called "a mess", Entertainment Tonight reported that Archuleta was feeling pressure from his father, Jeff, who "reportedly yelled at" his son after a recording session the previous night. Jeff Archuleta, in an interview with Us Weekly, denied the claim.

A May 2008 Associated Press article reported that Jeff Archuleta had his son add a lyric from the Sean Kingston song "Beautiful Girls" into an interpretation of "Stand by Me" (from which "Beautiful Girls" samples its bass line), increasing the costs for licensing, and that this had resulted in Jeff Archuleta being banned from American Idol backstage rehearsals. Archuleta defended his father, calling him "a great guy" who keeps him grounded.

During the Top 7 results show, the contestants were split into two groups. In one group was Syesha Mercado, Brooke White, and Kristy Lee Cook. In the other group was David Cook, Carly Smithson, and Jason Castro. Archuleta was the only one not sorted into a group. He was declared safe after the groups were formed, then was asked to choose the group he thought was safe. He refused, and sat down on the floor of the stage, much as Melinda Doolittle had done the previous season.

In the finale he sang "Don't Let the Sun Go Down on Me", "In This Moment" and "Imagine". Judge Simon Cowell declared that Archuleta won the evening and even David Cook, who ultimately won, thought Archuleta would win: "I have to concede it, the kid came out all three songs and nailed it", said Cook. In the final tally, Archuleta received 44 percent of the votes. During the finale show, identical commercials featuring Archuleta and fellow finalist Cook mimicked the Tom Cruise scene from Risky Business where he dances in his underwear playing an air guitar; they were promoting the game franchise Guitar Hero.

Performances:
Week	Theme	Song(s)	Original artist
Auditions	N/A	"Waiting on the World to Change"	John Mayer
Hollywood	N/A	"Crazy" (Note: The performance of Gnarls Barkley's "Crazy" was not aired due to licensing issues with American Idol and the original artist(s).)	Gnarls Barkley
Top 50	N/A	"Heaven"	Bryan Adams
Top 24	1960s	"Shop Around"	The Miracles
Top 20	1970s	"Imagine"	John Lennon
Top 16	1980s	"Another Day in Paradise"	Phil Collins
Top 12	Lennon–McCartney	"We Can Work It Out"	The Beatles
Top 11	The Beatles	"The Long and Winding Road"	The Beatles
Top 10	Songs from birth year of contestants (1990)	"You're the Voice"	John Farnham (Note: John Farnham released "You're the Voice" in 1986; it was re-arranged and released as a cover version by David Foster with vocalist Jeff Pescetto in 1990. Archuleta was born in 1990 so as such, he able to use it for the week's theme – "Songs from birth year of contestants".)
Top 9	Songs of Dolly Parton (mentor: Dolly Parton)	"Smoky Mountain Memories"	Dolly Parton
Top 8	Inspirational Songs	"Angels"	Robbie Williams
Top 7	Songs of Mariah Carey (mentor: Mariah Carey)	"When You Believe"	Mariah Carey & Whitney Houston
Top 6	Songs of Andrew Lloyd Webber (mentor: Andrew Lloyd Webber)	"Think of Me"	The Phantom of the Opera
Top 5	Songs of Neil Diamond (mentor: Neil Diamond)	"Sweet Caroline" "America"	Neil Diamond
Top 4	Music of the Rock and Roll Hall of Fame	"Stand by Me" "Love Me Tender"	Ben E. King; Elvis Presley
Top 3	Judge's Choice (Paula Abdul); Contestant's Choice; Producers' Choice	"And So It Goes" "With You" "Longer"	Billy Joel; Chris Brown; Dan Fogelberg
Finale	Clive Davis's Choice; New Song; Contestant's Choice	"Don't Let the Sun Go Down on Me" "In This Moment" "Imagine"	Elton John; Ryan Gillmor; John Lennon

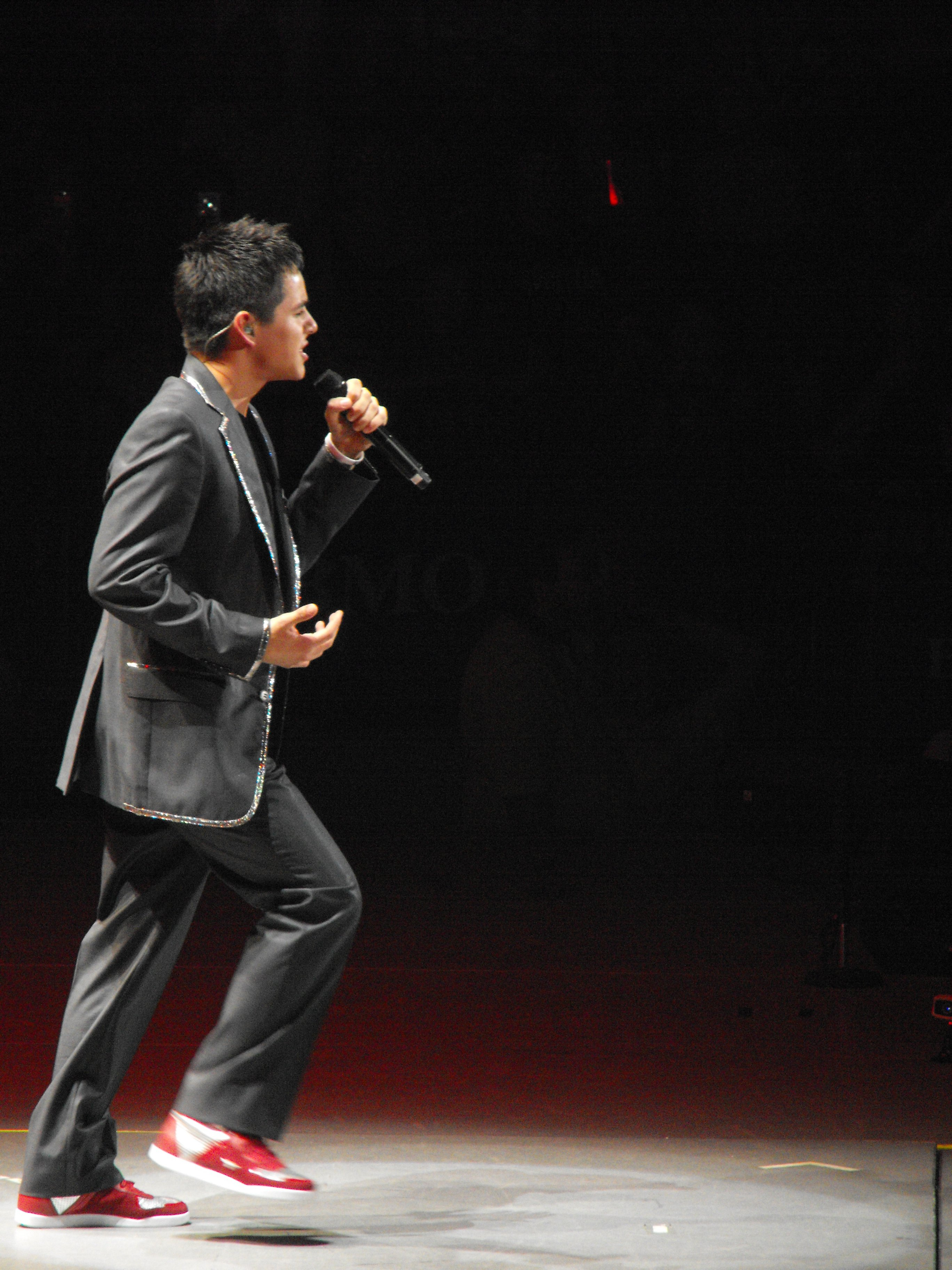
Archuleta performing during the American Idols LIVE! Tour 2008

Archuleta's first appearances on music ranking charts were with the three songs he performed in the American Idol finale: "Don't Let the Sun Go Down on Me", "In This Moment", and "Imagine" debuted on the Billboard Hot 100 chart the week of June 7, 2008. "Imagine" entered at number 36, giving Archuleta his first top-forty hit, "Don't Let the Sun Go Down on Me" at 58, and "In This Moment" at 60. That same week he had three songs on Billboard's Bubbling Under Hot 100 Singles chart as well, where his versions of "Longer", "Think of Me", and "Angels" debuted at number 15, number 19, and number 24 respectively.

Archuleta signed with Jive Records in June 2008. His self-titled album, David Archuleta, was released in November 2008. His first single, "Crush", was released in August 2008 on Z100, a New York radio station. On August 12 "Crush" became available on iTunes. It debuted at number two on the Billboard Hot 100, beaten only by Rihanna's "Disturbia". It was the best chart debut in more than 18 months. According to Nielsen SoundScan, the track sold 166,000 downloads in the first week in the United States. It has sold 1.92 million digital copies in the US.

Along with American Idol winner David Cook, Archuleta placed second on Forbes' list of "Breakout Stars of 2008". The two co-presented an award at the 2008 Teen Choice Awards in August 2008. Archuleta also received the Teen Choice Award surfboard for "Most Fanatic Fans".

=== 2009–2011: Christmas from the Heart, The Other Side of Down, Asian Tour and My Kind of Christmas Tour ===
Since the release of his debut album, Archuleta has released three new songs: "Let's Talk About Love (The Build-A-Bear theme song)", "Save the Day (released only in Japan as a bonus track in his album)", and "Zero Gravity". In February, it was announced that Archuleta would be touring the United Kingdom, supporting British band McFly on their "Up Close...And This Time It's Personal" tour. The tour began on April 21, 2009, and continued until May. Archuleta became the opening act for Demi Lovato's tour which began June 21, 2009.

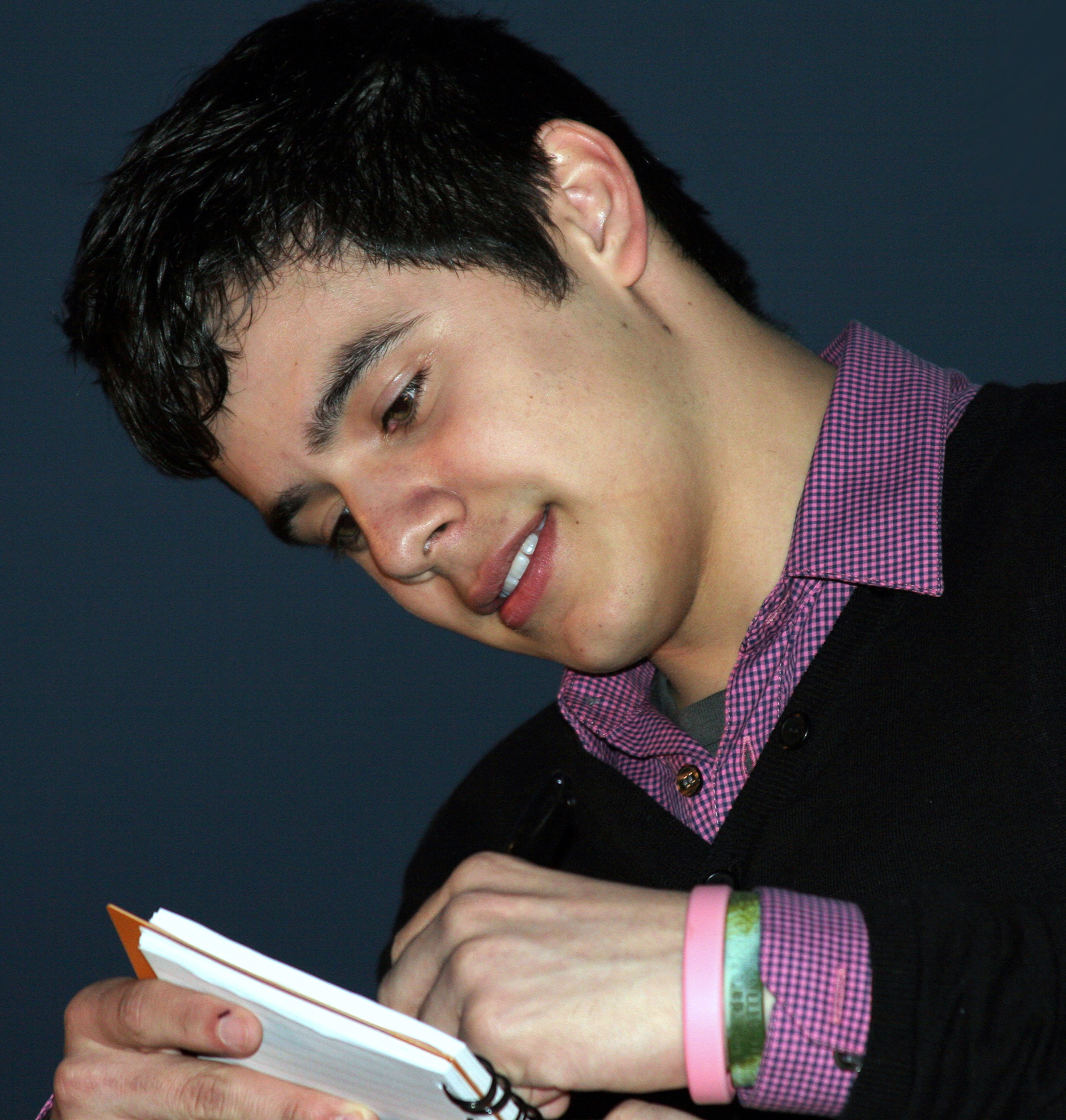
Archuleta signs autographs while serving as grand marshal at the Krewe of Caesar Mardi Gras parade in Metairie, Louisiana, on Valentine's Day in 2009.

On April 22, 2009, Archuleta returned to the American Idol stage in its eighth season and performed the third single from his debut album, "Touch My Hand". On April 30, 2009, he made his first UK television appearance, on The Paul O'Grady Show, performing "Crush" and chatting about his album, which was released there in May. In May, Archuleta and fellow American Idol David Cook visited the Philippines. Two days later he made live appearances on two of GMA-7's shows, Sis and Eat Bulaga!. He also confirmed that month that he was working on two new albums, his sophomore pop album and a Christmas album. In August 2009, Archuleta won three Teen Choice Awards for Breakout Artist, Love Song, and the Music Tour category with Demi Lovato. In September he won the Year in Music – Rising Male Star award at the ALMA Awards and performed a cover of the standard "Contigo en la Distancia".

Archuleta's acting debut was when he appeared as himself on Nickelodeon's show iCarly, in "iRocked the Vote". The episode aired February 7, 2009. He made a special guest appearance in Season 3 of the Disney Channel show Hannah Montana in the episode "Promma Mia" as himself, and he sang a duet ("I Wanna Know You") with Miley Cyrus, who played the title character. The song was featured on the soundtrack Hannah Montana 3 and also appeared later on the compilation Best of Hannah Montana.

On May 16, 2009, Archuleta and David Cook performed in the Mall of Asia concert grounds for their back-to-back concert in Manila, Philippines. On June 1, 2010, Archuleta released Chords of Strength: A Memoir of Soul, Song, and the Power of Perseverance, a memoir which refers to "the partial vocal paralysis he suffered in 2004 but has now fully recovered from". He went on a book signing tour beginning in Ridgewood, New Jersey. The book was a bestseller.

Archuleta came back to the American Idol stage on April 7, 2010, on the show's ninth season and performed John Lennon's "Imagine", which David had performed previously in the Top 20 Week when he was a contestant on the show. After his performance, he mentioned that he was working on his third studio album. Archuleta sang "The Star-Spangled Banner" and "Stand by Me" at the 30th anniversary of the annual A Capitol Fourth concert in Washington, D.C., on the Fourth of July. The show was aired on PBS at 8 pm EST live and tape delay PT.

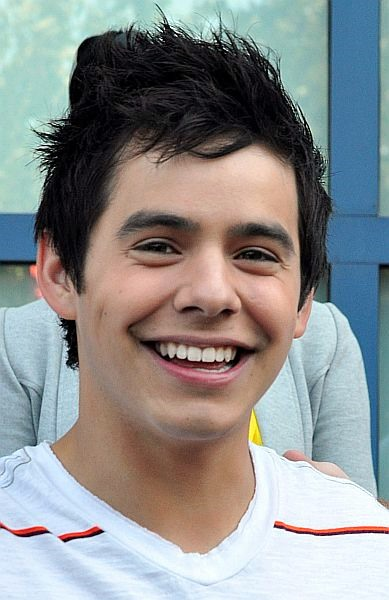
Archuleta at the 15th Annual Arthur Ashe Kids Day on August 28, 2010

Archuleta sang live at the Tejano Music Awards, covering Selena's songs, Como La Flor and No Me Queda Más at the event as a tribute on July 11, 2010. In an interview with AOL's Something Pitchy, Archuleta revealed that the release of his next album was planned for Fall 2010 (he did mention a late September release, but then went back to the Fall). On June 24, 2010, Jive Records announced that his new single would be released on DavidArchuleta.com on July 13, and iTunes on July 20. However, on June 30, 2010, the full version of "Something 'Bout Love" became available to play on his website. His album The Other Side of Down was released on October 5, 2010.

On October 7, 2010, it was announced that David Archuleta would be the guest star at the annual Christmas concert of the Mormon Tabernacle Choir. Archuleta sang in performances on December 16–19. On September 6, 2011, Glad Christmas Tidings, a concert CD and DVD of the choir and Archuleta's performance, was released.

On February 18, 2011, it was announced by Jive Records that David Archuleta had been released from his contract with them. It was also announced on February 17, 2011, that Archuleta left his management Wright Entertainment Group. Archuleta stated that would be working on writing original material. On July 2, 2011, Archuleta joined Brad Paisley to perform at the Stadium of Fire, where he performed the national anthem in addition to his five-song set. From July 16 to 26, 2011, Archuleta toured Asia, performing in Indonesia, Philippines, Vietnam (Hanoi and Ho Chi Minh), and Malaysia.

At the conclusion of the December 19, 2011, show of the My Kind of Christmas Tour, Archuleta announced his intention to serve as a missionary for The Church of Jesus Christ of Latter-day Saints for two years. He stated that he would return to music upon the completion of his mission.

=== 2012–2014: Nandito Ako, Forevermore, Begin, and No Matter How Far ===
In early 2012, Archuleta signed a contract with TV5 to shoot a prime-time mini series in the Philippines, Nandito Ako (I'm Here), which was broadcast from February to March 2012. An Original Pilipino Music album was released on March 26, 2012, in the Philippines, Forevermore. This album contains covers of classic Filipino songs, including "Nandito Ako" by Ogie Alcasid, "Forevermore" by Side A, "Rainbow" by South Border and Nexxus's "I'll Never Go".

On August 7, 2012, a pre-recorded album, Begin, was released in the United States. The album consists of cover songs as well as a new original track, "Broken". On February 12, 2013, a new song called "Don't Run Away", which had leaked online back in October 2012, was released on iTunes as the lead single from Archuleta's second release while serving on his mission. A compilation album, No Matter How Far, which consists of tracks previously only available in Asia and two newly released original songs, was released on March 26, 2013.

Archuleta embarked on a Military Tribute Tour.

=== 2015–2024: Meet the Mormons, Postcards in the Sky, Winter in the Air, Therapy Sessions, and The Masked Singer ===
Archuleta was reportedly shooting a music video in Costa Rica for an untitled track, following a tweet from his road manager, Kari Sellards, with a picture that shows sets for shooting. The tweets included the hashtag #DA2014, which fans had been tweeting on his absence for 2 years. On September 25, photos surfaced online of the "Nunca Pense" music video. The song and its video were to debut on February 12–15, 2015, to be performed at RootsTech 2015 with comedy sketch group Studio C. On September 28, he released a new single "Glorious" as a free download. The song was used in the motion picture Meet the Mormons and later included in the holiday album Winter in the Air, released in 2018.

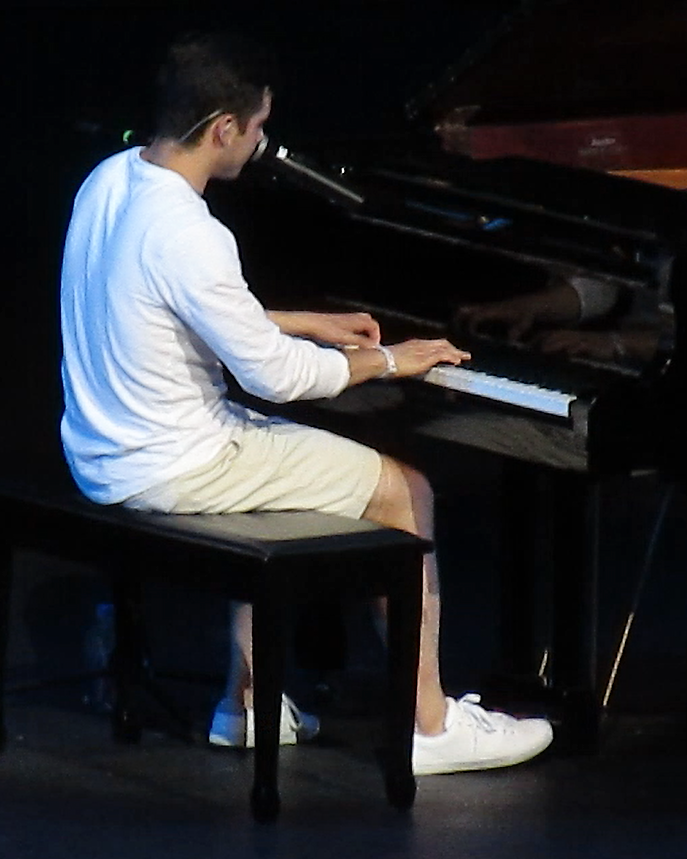
Archuleta performing in 2018

Archuleta performed in the group performance of "One Voice" on the fifteenth season finale of American Idol in April 2016. He returned to his music career in 2016 with the single "Numb", which premiered on November 4, 2016. The official video premiered on November 17. In 2017 he released the singles "Up All Night" and "Invincible", followed by the release of his sixth studio album Postcards in the Sky, which was released on October 20, 2017. He started his tour in the Philippines with a one-night concert at the Kia Theater and toured around the United States.

On June 15, 2018, Peter Hollens released a video on his YouTube channel of a collaboration between Archuleta and Hollens singing the Scottish folk song "Loch Lomond".

On August 27, 2019, he released the single "Paralyzed".

On November 14, 2019, Archuleta released a deluxe version of his 2018 album Winter in the Air with three bonus tracks ("The Christmas Song", "Merry Christmas, Happy Holidays", and "Still, Still, Still"). He released a music video for "Merry Christmas, Happy Holidays", with special appearances by Lance Bass and Chris Kirkpatrick.

Archuleta released his eighth studio album, Therapy Sessions on May 20, 2020. The deluxe version, "Therapy Sessions - The Lost Sessions", was released on October 21 of that same year. On April 30, he released "Just Breathe" as a single and released a music video dedicated to the people working on the frontline during the COVID-19 pandemic. Money earned from YouTube views would be donated to Direct Relief towards COVID-19 relief.

On March 26, 2021, Archuleta collaborated with BYU Vocal Point to make the "What a Beautiful Name" video.

A self-written song, "I Know He Lives", was released in March 2021. David explains: "I've performed this one live before, but I've never recorded it in the studio... until now. Can't wait for y'all to hear it!" Two singles, "Be That for You", and "Losin' Sleep", were released in April and May 2021, respectively.

Archuleta also has a children's book, My Little Prayer, that was released in 2021 through Bushel & Peck Books.

In 2023, Archuleta competed in the ninth season of The Masked Singer as "Macaw" and finished in second place.

In 2024, Archuleta went viral on TikTok for performing a cover version of Sabrina Carpenter's "Espresso" in a concert held in New York City. He also performed a cover version of Sabrina Carpenter's "Please Please Please" for SiriusXM's TikTok Radio channel.

=== 2025–2026: Earthly Delights ===
In June 2025, Archuleta announced the release of a new EP and North American tour, Earthly Delights. The EP was preceded by the singles, "Crème Brulée" and "Can I Call You". In 2026, Archuleta published a memoir, Devout, about his experience coming out as queer and leaving the LDS Church. The book debuted at number seventeen on the Publishers Weekly Bestsellers List selling 3,455 units in its first week.

== Philanthropy ==
Along with Do Something and the Dunkin' Brands Community Foundation, Archuleta is involved with helping willing teenagers make a difference in others' lives with disaster relief. He was also one of several teen celebrities taking part in DoSomething.org's Teens for Jeans charity initiative, which donates denim to homeless teenagers nationwide. In January 2010, Haiti was hit with a major earthquake. On January 22, 2010, Archuleta joined other celebrities for a two-hour fundraising telethon, where he answered phones and even stayed afterward to keep answering the phones.

Archuleta partnered with ChildFund International for his My Kind of Christmas Tour in an effort to increase awareness and recruit new sponsors for children in need worldwide. Archuleta also surprised some of ChildFund's children in their Philippines program, when he sang Bridge Over Troubled Water, and then met with the children in small groups. He has also been one of the most consistent artist supporters of Invisible Children, rallying fans to donate to protection initiatives in Central Africa, and performing at events held by the organization.

In January 2011, Archuleta travelled to Chennai, India, with Rising Star Outreach, a non-profit charity giving children from leper colonies a first-class education and a chance at a future in India.

Archuleta was one of the many Latino singers who participated in Somos El Mundo, the Spanish version of "We Are the World 25 for Haiti".

In April 2020, David Archuleta collaborated with Billboard for a Live At-Home concert to raise money for Direct Relief. He chose the organization due to their global efforts in combating the COVID-19 pandemic. During the COVID-19 pandemic, Archuleta participated in Billboard's Live At-Home sessions, where he performed piano versions of "OK, All Right", "Crush", and "What a Wonderful World", and released a music video for "Just Breathe" dedicated to the frontline workers; both were fundraisers for Direct Relief.

On February 20, 2024, Archuleta appeared on season 3, episode 22 of Celebrity Name That Tune, competing against Teresa Giudice and ultimately winning $104,000 for the Trevor Project.

== Artistry ==
Archuleta's mother is from Honduras, and much of the music he listened to as a child was Latin-influenced, including watching his mom sing at events with her sisters. She also "was big on dancing" according to Archuleta, and would "make" him dance to traditional music with his older sister. He also listened to jazz music, he said, from his father's collection, as well as gospel, pop, rock and "soulful music". In a later interview, he revealed that his father was a jazz musician. Archuleta also said he enjoys Broadway musicals.

Archuleta has been described as having a tenor vocal range, which Today described as "one of those once-in-a-decade pop voices". Michelle Drown of the Santa Barbara Independent described it as "silken" with a "gentle vibrato". When the singer released his single "Something 'Bout Love" in 2010, a writer for Billboard theorized that fans might miss "his unadulterated tone that was best showcased by ballads" on earlier releases. On his American Idol "Fast Facts" page, Archuleta cited his musical influences as Natalie Cole, Stevie Wonder, Kirk Franklin and Bryan Adams. Like Elliott Yamin and another singer he admires, John Mayer, Archuleta tries to infuse his pop selections with a soulful vibe. In a Seventeen interview, he cited Sara Bareilles as a clever singer-songwriter whom he looks up to.

== Personal life ==
From 2015 to 2025, Archuleta resided in Nashville, Tennessee. He has since relocated to Los Angeles, California.

When Archuleta was 21, he volunteered for two years as a full-time missionary for the Church of Jesus Christ of Latter-day Saints (LDS Church) and was assigned to serve in Chile.

In June 2021, Archuleta came out as a member of the LGBTQ community. In an interview published in November 2022, Archuleta described himself as queer. He said that after he was able to accept his sexuality within his own spirituality, he spoke with LDS Church leaders about the religion's views on being queer. He said the conversations were pointless and made him feel defeated. He described his relationship with the church as "very complicated". He said that at one point, he considered suicide, figuring that God would more readily forgive him for committing suicide compared to being queer. He also noted that, before his coming out in 2021, he had an anxiety attack while on a date with his then-fiancée and called off his engagement to her soon afterwards. Archuleta said he had also been engaged to women several times previously.

In June 2023, Archuleta stated that he is no longer a member of the LDS Church. His mother and other family members also left the LDS Church in support of his decision.

In 2024, Archuleta further clarified his sexuality as gay and demisexual. In August 2025, he stated that he is queer, dating men mostly, but "still open to meeting girls".

In his 2026 memoir Devout, Archuleta writes that a therapist suggested he may have scrupulosity, a religious subtype of obsessive-compulsive disorder. He also experiences anxiety attacks.

== Discography ==
- David Archuleta (2008)
- Christmas from the Heart (2009)
- The Other Side of Down (2010)
- Forevermore (2012)
- Begin (2012)
- Postcards in the Sky (2017)
- Winter in the Air (2018)
- Therapy Sessions (2020)
- Warm Me Up (2026)

== Bibliography ==
- Devout (2026)

== Filmography ==
=== Television ===
Year	Film	Role	Notes
2003	Star Search	Himself	Junior Singer, Semi-finalist
2008	American Idol	Himself	Runner-up
2008	The Ellen DeGeneres Show	Himself/Guest	Interview and live performance of "Crush"
2009	iCarly	Himself	Season 2 - Episode 12: "iRocked the Vote"
2009	Hannah Montana	Himself	Season 3 - Episode 14: "Promma Mia"
2009	SiS	Himself/Guest	Promotion of David Archuleta Solo Tour 2009: GMA Network
2009; 2017	Eat Bulaga!	Himself/Guest	Promotion of David Archuleta Solo Tour 2009: GMA Network
2009	Cool Center	Himself/Guest	Interview
2009	24 Oras	Himself/Guest	Live interview with David Cook
2010	Tosh.0	Himself	Cameo; Episode 21: "American Idol Girls"
2012	Nandito Ako (Here I Am)	Josh Bradley	Lead role Philippine TV series
2014	David Archuleta: Called to Serve	Himself	KSL Special Documentary
2022	The Jennifer Hudson Show	Himself/Guest	Interview
2023	The Masked Singer	Himself/Macaw	Season 9 contestant
2024	Celebrity Name That Tune	Himself	Season 3 - Episode 22: "Pharaohs and Idols"
2024	American Idol	Himself/Guest	Performed his single "Hell Together."
2025	The Kelly Clarkson Show	Himself/Guest	Interview

=== Web ===
Year	Title	Role	Notes
2009	KSM: Read Between the Lines	Himself	3 episodes
2026	Was I in A Cult?	Himself	Podcast; 2 Episodes

== Awards and nominations ==
Year	Presenter	Award	Result	Ref.
2008	Teen Choice Awards	Most Fanatic Fans	Won	
2008	Teen Choice Awards	Best Smile (Post-Show)	Won	
2009	Teen Choice Awards	Breakout Artist	Won	
2009	Teen Choice Awards	Music: Love Song ("Crush")	Won	
2009	Teen Choice Awards	Music Tour (shared with Demi Lovato)	Won	
2009	Alma Awards	Music Rising Star	Won	
2009	MYX Music Awards	Favorite International Music Video ("Crush")	Won	
2009	Hit FM Music Awards	Best New Artist	Nominated	
2009	Hit FM Music Awards	Best Breakthrough Artist	Nominated	
2009	Hit FM Music Awards	Best Male Artist	Nominated	
2009	Hit FM Music Awards	Song of the Year ("Crush")	Nominated	
2010	Teen Choice Awards	Most Fanatic Fans	Nominated	
2010	Teen Choice Awards	American Idol Alum	Won	
2010	J-14 Teen Icon Awards	Iconic Fan Favorite	Won	
2010	J-14 Teen Icon Awards	Iconic Tweeter	Nominated	
2011	Barkada Choice Awards	Teen Icon	Won	
2012	2012 Golden Teevee and Mask Awards	Favorite Breakthrough TV performance by an Actor	Won	
2023	Paris Play Film Awards	Best Music Video ("I'm Yours")	Won	
2023	Milan Gold Awards	Best Music Video ("I'm Yours")	Won	
2024	GLAAD Media Awards	Outstanding Breakthrough Music Artist	Won	
