= Kris Allen discography =

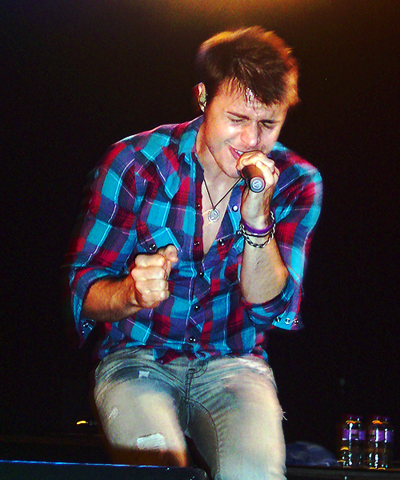
- Kris Allen, June 2010 in Milwaukee, WI
- Studio albums: 6
- Extended plays: 5
- Compilation albums: 4
- Singles: 8
- Music videos: 5

American singer Kris Allen has released six studio albums, five EPs, eight singles and five music videos. He self-released an album titled Brand New Shoes in 2007 before rising to prominence in 2009 as the winner of the eighth season of American Idol. His coronation single, "No Boundaries", reached the top 15 on both the American Billboard Hot 100 and Canadian Hot 100 charts. Allen released his self-titled second album in November 2009, which included the successful lead single, "Live Like We're Dying". The album additionally generated the singles "The Truth" and "Alright with Me" in 2010.

Allen released "The Vision of Love" in 2012 as the lead single for his third album, Thank You Camellia. The song yielded minimal chart success and Allen ultimately parted ways with RCA Records. He has since released three albums on his independent label imprint DogBear Records: Horizons (2014), Letting You In (2016), and Somethin' About Christmas (2016). A compilation album 10 was released in 2019. Kris released five promotional singles in 2021 and one in 2022 via DogBear Records.

== Albums ==
=== Studio albums ===
Title	Album details	Peak chart positions			Sales
Title	Album details	US	US Indie	CAN	Sales
Brand New Shoes	Released: September 16, 2007; Label: Independent; Formats: CD	—	—	—	US: 600
Kris Allen	Released: November 17, 2009; Label: Jive/19; Formats: CD, digital download	11	—	50	US: 346,000
Thank You Camellia	Released: May 22, 2012; Label: RCA/19; Formats: CD, digital download, vinyl	26	—	93	US: 35,000
Horizons	Released: August 12, 2014; Label: DogBear/+180; Formats: CD, digital download	80	10	—	US: 4,000
Letting You In	Released: March 18, 2016; Label: DogBear; Formats: CD, digital download, vinyl	—	17	—	
Somethin' About Christmas	Released: November 4, 2016; Label: DogBear; Formats: CD, digital download	—	—	—	
"—" denotes a title that did not chart or has not been released

=== Compilation albums ===
Title	Album details	Peak chart positions		Sales
Title	Album details	US	US Indie	Sales
Season 8 Favorite Performances	Released: June 30, 2009; Label: RCA; Format: Digital download	50	7	US: 16,000
10	Released: September 20, 2019; Label: DogBear Records; Format: CD, Digital download	—	—	
"—" denotes album that did not chart or was not released

== Extended plays ==
Title	Details
The Vision of Love (Remixes)	Released: May 28, 2012; Label: RCA/19; Format: CD, digital download
Thank You Camellia (Fan Edition)	Released: May 22, 2012; Label: RCA/19; Formats: Digital download
Waiting for Christmas	Released: December 10, 2012; Label: My T Mouse; Formats: Digital download
Acoustic Tapes	Released: April 6, 2016; Label: Dogbear Records; Formats: Digital download
Letting You In: Acoustic Performances	Released: April 7, 2017; Label: Dogbear Records; Formats: Digital download

== Singles ==
Title	Year	Peak chart positions								Sales	Certifications	Album
Title	Year	US	US AC	US Adult	US Pop	US Christ	CAN	UK	NZ	Sales	Certifications	Album
"No Boundaries"	2009	11	19	—	—	—	13	92	—	US: 343,000		American Idol Season 8
"Live Like We're Dying"	2009	18	8	3	10	21	41	—	18	US: 1,800,000	US: Platinum	Kris Allen
"The Truth" (featuring Pat Monahan)	2010	—	—	16	—	—	—	—	—	US: 137,000		Kris Allen
"Alright with Me"	2010	—	—	—	—	—	—	—	—	US: 39,000		Kris Allen
"The Vision of Love"	2012	—	—	29	—	—	—	—	—	US: 25,000		Thank You Camellia
"Prove It to You" (featuring Lenachka)	2014	—	—	—	—	—	—	—	—			Horizons
"Waves"	2016	—	—	—	—	—	—	—	—			Letting You In
"Love Will Find You"	2016	—	—	—	—	—	—	—	—			Letting You In
"—" denotes a title that did not chart or wasn't released to that certain country.

== Promotional singles ==
Title	Year	Album
"Baby, It Ain't Christmas Without You"	2014	Non-album single
"When All the Stars Have Died"	2018	Non-album single
"Don't Stop Dancing"	2021	Non-album single
"Hallelujah! For Now"	2021	Non-album single
"Safe Harbor"	2021	Non-album single
"Different Bridges, Same River"	2021	Non-album single
"Hello, Mr. Right Next Door"	2021	Non-album single
"It's You I Like"	2022	Non-album single

== Other charted songs ==
Year	Single	Peak chart positions				Sales	Album	Notes
Year	Single	US	US AC	US Pop 100	CAN	Sales	Album	Notes
2009	"Heartless"	16	—	29	39	US: 412,000	Non-album songs	American Idol live performances
2009	"Ain't No Sunshine"	37	—	—	68	US: 125,000	Non-album songs	American Idol live performances
2009	"Apologize"	66	—	—	—	US: 59,000	Non-album songs	American Idol live performances
2009	"Falling Slowly"	94	—	—	—	US: 38,000	Non-album songs	American Idol live performances
2009	"What's Going On"	107	—	—	—	US: 21,000	Non-album songs	American Idol live performances
2009	"To Make You Feel My Love"	113	—	—	—	US: 26,000	Non-album songs	American Idol live performances
2010	"Let It Be"	63	—	—	—	US: 86,000	Non-album songs	Charity single
2016	"A Little Bit of Christmas" (Jim Brickman featuring Kris Allen)	—	26	—	—		Comfort & Joy	Holiday radio single
"—" denotes a title that did not chart

== Music videos ==
Year	Song	Album	Director
2009	"Live Like We're Dying"	Kris Allen	Marco Puig
2010	"The Truth"	Kris Allen	Aaron Platt
2010	"Alright With Me"	Kris Allen	Matthew Leonard
2012	"The Vision of Love"	Thank You Camellia	Lenny Bass
2016	"Waves"	Letting You In	Matt Delisi

== Soundtrack ==
Release date	Title	Format	Song	Artist(s)	Writer(s)	Director(s)	Award(s)
April 4, 2014	Valley Inn	Feature Film	"Love In A Small Town"	Allen	Allen & Mary Steenburgen	Kim Swink, Chris Spencer	Unknown
April 25, 2015	Fork	Short Film	Fork Theme (Instrumental)	Allen	Allen	David Huffman	Fork Awards

== Songwriting ==
=== Songs released by others ===
Year	Title	Writer(s)	Artist	Release
2011	"Before We Come Undone"	Allen, Lindy Robbins, Greg Kurstin	Lloyd Cele	One
2011	"Raise Your Hand"	Allen, Kevin Hughes, Andrew Frampton	Javier Colon	Come Through For You
2011	"Still Got Tonight"	Allen, Steve Kipner, Andrew Frampton	Matthew Morrison	Matthew Morrison
2011	"Blindfolded"	Allen, Toby Gad, Lindy Robbins	Heinz Winckler	24/7/365
2012	"If Only I Could Cry"	Allen, Daniel Powter, Scott Stevens	Daniel Powter	Turn on the Lights
2013	"Never in a Million"	Allen, Sam Farrar, Tony Lucca	Tony Lucca	With The Whole World Watching
2016	"Some Days"	Allen, Bryan Shackle, Mat Sherman, Francesco Rossini	Frank Pole	Some Days - Single
2016	"A Little Bit of Christmas"	Allen, Jim Brickman	Jim Brickman	A Little Bit of Christmas - Single
2018	"Never In a Million Years"	Allen, Andrew Ripp, Ethan Hulse	Andrew Ripp	The Heart

=== Demo recordings ===
Title	Writer(s)	License Registration
"Forget About You"	Allen, Steven Lee Olsen, Matt Serletic	ole
"I Don't Wanna Know"	Allen, Lindy Robbins, Samuel Hollander, David Katz	ASCAP, Harry Fox Agency
"I'm Coming Over"	Allen, Ashley Glenn Gorley, Miller Crowell	Harry Fox Agency, Warner-Chappell
"Love Too Much"	Allen, Kevin Rudolf	
"Parachute"	Allen, Steven Lee Olsen, Matt Serletic	ole

=== Unreleased songs ===
Title	Writer(s)	License Registration
"100 Reasons"	Allen, Jamie Hartman, Andy Stochansky	BMI, Harry Fox Agency
"Alone with You"	Allen, April Geesbreght	Harry Fox Agency
"All We Need is This Love"	Allen, Ian Kirkpatrick, Tim Pagnotta	BMI
"Bad Impressions"	Allen, Paige Carly, Andrew Skib	BMI
"Beautiful Breakdown"	Allen, Jamie Hartman, Andy Stochansky	ASCAP, BMI, Harry Fox Agency
"Belle Meade Gal"	Allen	Harry Fox Agency
"Best Intentions"	Allen, David Hodges, Steve Miller	BMI, Harry Fox Agency
"Breaking in a Broken Heart"	Allen, Josh Kear, Luke Laird	Harry Fox Agency
"Burn the Ships Down"	Allen, Anna Roberts, Philip Barnes	BMI
"Calling Out Your Name"	Allen, Timothy Alan Pagnotta, Matt Bair	Harry Fox Agency
"Call On Me"	Allen, Gabe Dixon	BMI
"Catch Me (You Can't Hurt Me)"	Allen, Helene Immel	Harry Fox Agency
"Cold December"	Allen, Sean McConnell	BMI
"Concrete"	Allen, Adam Hambrick	Harry Fox Agency
"Day I Did You Wrong"	Allen, Scott Stevens	Harry Fox Agency
"Death of Mr. Jones"	Allen, Cale Mills, Chris Torres, Jordan Wright	BMI
"Don't Count on Us"	Allen, Blair Daly	BMI
"Don't Mess Around On Me"	Allen, Cale Mills, Chris Torres, Jordan Wright	BMI
"Every Mistake"	Allen, Mike Krompass, Shelly Peiken	BMI
"Falling from the Sky"	Allen, Adam Hambrick	Harry Fox Agency
"Everything about You"	Allen, Rusty Varenkamp	ASCAP
"Feeling This Way"	Allen, Bryan Shackle, Mat Sherman	Warner-Chappell
"For Better Or Worse"	Allen, Ryan Petersen, Nolan Sipe	ASCAP, BMI, Harry Fox Agency
"For Granted"	Allen, Brian Howes, Toby Gad	ASCAP, Harry Fox Agency
"From the Wreckage"	Allen, Warren Huart, Tebey	BMI
"Get It Got It Good"	Allen, Nathan Barlowe, Brian Shackle	BMI
"Gold"	Allen, Andrew M. Dorff, Benjamin Curtis Caver	Harry Fox Agency
"Good Hold of My Heart"	Allen, Tobias Karlsson	ASCAP, Harry Fox Agency
"Hate That You Love Me This Much"	Allen, Catt Gravitt, Tom Shapiro	Harry Fox Agency
"Headed Toward the Sunrise"	Allen, David Hodges, Steve Miller	BMI, Harry Fox Agency
"Heavy Halo"	Allen, Emily Wright, Joe Ginsberg	BMG
"I'm Really Cool"	Allen	
"I Forgot Your Number"	Allen, Adam Hambrick	Harry Fox Agency
"I Just Want You"	Allen, Fransisca Hall, Dave Bassett	ASCAP
"I Provide"	Allen, Toby Gad, David Quinories	ASCAP, Harry Fox Agency
"I See Stars"	Allen, Isaac Hasson, John Philip Clark Jr.	BMG Publishing, BMI
"I Won't Be Home"	Allen, Curt Schneider	Harry Fox Agency
"If I Had My Way"	Allen, Andrew DeRoberts, Adam Hambrick	Harry Fox Agency
"If These Walls Could Speak"	Allen, Lindy Robbins, Toby Gad	ASCAP, Harry Fox Agency
"If Only I Could Lie"	Allen, Scott Stevens	Harry Fox Agency
"Keep On Calling"	Allen, Emily Wright, James McCormick	BMG
"Keep the Light On"	Allen, Michael James Ryan Busbee, Jon Green	BMI
"Ladadade"	Allen, Emily Wright, Joe Ginsberg	BMG
"Lost Without You"	Allen, Daniel Dodd Wilson, Gary Michael Louris	ASCAP, Harry Fox Agency
"Love in a Small Town"	Allen, Mary Steenburgen	Harry Fox Agency
"No"	Allen, Toby Gad, Brian Howes	ASCAP, BMG, BMI, Harry Fox Agency
"Not Too Late to Run"	Allen, David Hodges, Steve McMorran	BMI, Harry Fox Agency
"Oblivion"	Allen, Josh Crosby, Catt Gravitt	Harry Fox Agency
"Peace and Happiness"	Allen	Harry Fox Agency
"Polygraphy"	Allen, Adam Hambrick, Kelly Archer	Harry Fox Agency
"Ready or Not"	Allen, Jason Castro, Jon McLaughlin	Harry Fox Agency
"Record High Love"	Allen, Jaren Johnston	Harry Fox Agency
"Released"	Allen, Lindy Robbins, Toby Gad	ASCAP, Harry Fox Agency
"Right to be Loved"	Allen, April Geesbreght, KS Rhoads	Harry Fox Agency
"Shooting Stars"	Allen, Cindy Morgan, Micah Kuiper	SESAC
"Should I"	Allen, Ryan Petersen, Nolan Sipe	BMI
"Should've Kept It to Myself"	Allen, Francis "Eg" White	ASCAP, Harry Fox Agency
"Slow It Down"	Allen, Andrew DeRoberts, Jesse Jones, Maile Misajon	Harry Fox Agency
"Some Days"	Allen, Bryan Shackle, Matthew Sherman	ASCAP
"Some Kind of Perfect"	Allen, Rune Westberg	Harry Fox Agency
"Something to Fight For"	Allen, Phillip LaRue	BMI, Harry Fox Agency
"Somewhere I've Never Been"	Allen, David Ryan Harris, Maureen McDonald	ASCAP, BMI
"That's Me Without You"	Allen, David Barnes	BMG
"To Build a Tomb"	Allen, Owen Wilson, Andrew Richards	Harry Fox Agency
"Tongue Tied"	Allen, Cary Barlowe, Savannah Keyes, Hillary Lindsey, Gordon Sampson, Troy Verges	BMG Publishing
"Touch"	Allen, Daniel Dodd Wilson, Gary Michael Louris	ASCAP, Harry Fox Agency
"Unique"	Allen, Jason Reeves, Rune Westberg	ASCAP, Harry Fox Agency
"Unperfect"	Allen, Jaren Johnston, Zac Maloy	ASCAP, Harry Fox Agency
"Venice"	Allen	BMI
"We Are"	Allen, Michael James Ryan Busbee, Jon Green	BMI
"We Still Got Tonight"	Allen, Andrew Frampton, Steve Kipner	Warner-Chappell
"When All the Stars Have Died"	Allen, Gabe Dixon	BMI
"Who Was I"	Allen, Bobby Hamrick, Stephen Wilson	BMG
"Will You be My Moonlight"	Allen, Steenburgen	Harry Fox Agency, ASCAP

== Songs in other media ==
Year	Title	Type	Song
2010	American Idol	TV series episode: "Atlanta Auditions"	"Before We Come Undone"
2010	The Sims 3	Video game trailer for E3 2010	"Live Like We're Dying"
2010	The Hills	TV series episode 4: "This Is Goodbye"	"Live Like We're Dying"
2010	Dancing with the Stars	TV series episode: "Week Four, Dances"	"Live Like We're Dying"
2010	Ford Motor Company	TV ad	"Written All Over My Face", "Alright With Me"
2010	The Vampire Diaries	TV series episode 5: "Kill or Be Killed"	"I Need to Know"
2010	The Hills	TV series episode 4: "This Is Goodbye"	"Live Like We're Dying"
2010	So You Think You Can Dance	TV series episode: "Las Vegas week"	"Alright With Me"
2012	So You Think You Can Dance	TV series episode 5: "Las Vegas Callbacks"	"Out Alive"
2012	Rachael Ray (TV series)	TV series Season 7, episode 1	"The Vision of Love"
2012	Glee (TV series)	TV series Season 2, episode 22: "New York"	"Still Got Tonight" (Composer)
2014	Arrow (TV series)	TV series Season 3, episode 5: "The Secret Origin of Felicity Smoak"	"Lost"
2014	The Vampire Diaries (TV series)	TV series Season 6, episode 9: "I Alone"	"Lost"
