= Horizons (Kris Allen album) =

Studio album by Kris Allen
- Released: August 12, 2014
- Recorded: 2014
- Studios: The Art House and The Chapel (Nashville, Tennessee)
- Genres: Pop; pop rock; indie pop
- Length: 35:05
- Labels: DogBear; +180
- Producer: Charlie Peacock

Kris Allen chronology
Waiting for Christmas (2012)	Horizons (2014)	Letting You In (2016)

Singles from Horizons
- 1. "Prove It to You" Released: July 7, 2014

Professional ratings
Review scores
Source	Rating
Rate Your Music	3.25/5

Horizons is the fourth studio album by American singer-songwriter Kris Allen. It was released on August 12, 2014, by Allen's independent label, DogBear Records. Allen also organized a Stageit show as a release party for the record where he performed the full album set and also a song called Unique. A portion of the proceeds from the album go to benefit Music Empowers Foundation.

== Background ==
Allen was dropped by RCA Records in 2012, after releasing two albums - Kris Allen (2009) and Thank You Camellia (2012) - through the label. He released Horizons independently through his own label, DogBear Records.

As a result of an accident which broke his wrist, Allen had to change his approach to music making for this album, in particular he began to use a finger-picking style of guitar playing. According to Allen, "it’s a different way to play and some of those songs were written when my hand was in a cast so all I had was my fingers. I think it made me a bit more melodic than just strumming a bunch of chords." He sought out the producer Charlie Peacock to produce his album. Peacock introduced Allen to a number of people, including Lenachka with whom he recorded "Prove It to You". "Prove It to You" was released as the lead single from the album on July 7, 2014.

== Critical reception ==
AllMusic editor Steve Leggett noted: "Allen wrote the ten songs included here in Nashville, and while Horizons doesn't differ much in pace or temperament from his other albums, it does have a bit more of a country music feel."

== Commercial performance ==
Horizons debuted at number 80 on the US Billboard 200 with 4,000 copies sold for the week. It also reached number ten on the US Independent Albums chart.

== Track listing ==
Horizons track listing
No.	Title	Writer(s)	Length
1.	"Young Love ("Paul Simon")"	Kris Allen; Cale Mills; Chris Torres	3:26
2.	"Prove It to You" (feat. Lenachka)	Allen; Cindy Morgan	3:34
3.	"Beautiful & Wild"	Allen; Chris Lindsey	3:50
4.	"In Time"	Allen; Mike Donehey; Charlie Peacock	3:27
5.	"Lost"	Allen; K.S. Rhoads	3:18
6.	"Don't Set Me Free"	Allen; Sam Ashworth	3:32
7.	"Everybody Just Wants to Dance"	Allen	3:08
8.	"Parachute"	Allen; April Geesbreght	3:17
9.	"It's Always You"	Allen; Adam Hambrick	4:01
10.	"Girl Across the Room"	Allen	3:32
Total length:			35:05

== Personnel ==
Performers and musicians

- Kris Allen – vocals, acoustic guitars, electric guitars, beat boxing
- Charlie Peacock – keyboards, acoustic piano, programming, percussion
- K.S. Rhoads – acoustic piano
- Andrew St. Marie – acoustic piano
- Cody Fry – programming, backing vocals
- James Sweeting – programming, handclaps
- Jerry McPherson – electric guitars
- Andy Leftwich – mandolin, fiddle
- Mark Hill – electric bass
- Evan Hutchings – drums
- Sam Ashworth – percussion, handclaps, sounds, backing vocals
- Ken Lewis – percussion
- Lenachka – vocals (2)

Technical

- Charlie Peacock – producer, additional engineer
- Richie Biggs – engineer, mixing, mastering
- Sam Ashworth – additional engineer
- James Sweeting – additional engineer, production coordinator
- Richard Dodd – mastering
- Brenton Little – design, photography
- Lindsay McCall – management
- Stirling McIIwaine – management

== Charts ==
Weekly chart performance for Horizons
Chart (2014)	Peak position
US Billboard 200	80
US Independent Albums (Billboard)	10

== Release dates ==
Horizons release history
Region	Date	Label	Format(s)	Ref(s)
United States	August 12, 2014	DogBear Records	CD; digital download	
Germany	August 12, 2014	DogBear Records	CD; digital download	
