= Still Got Tonight =

Single by Matthew Morrison

from the album Matthew Morrison
- Released: April 26, 2011
- Genre: Pop rock
- Length: 4:29
- Label: Mercury; Island Def Jam
- Songwriter(s): Andrew Frampton; Steve Kipner; Kris Allen
- Producer(s): Frampton; Kipner

Matthew Morrison singles chronology
"Summer Rain" (2011)	"Still Got Tonight" (2011)	"It Don't Mean a Thing" (2013)

"Still Got Tonight" is a song recorded by American actor and singer Matthew Morrison for his eponymous debut studio album. It was written and produced by Andrew Frampton and Steve Kipner and co-written by Kris Allen. "Still Got Tonight" was released April 26, 2011 as the second single from Matthew Morrison.

== Background ==
Kris Allen wrote "Still Got Tonight" with the producers and co-writers behind his hit single "Live Like We're Dying" — Andrew Frampton and Steve Kipner — for his second major label album, but eventually opted not to record the track. A few years later, Frampton and Kipner offered the song to Morrison while working with him on Morrison's debut album. According to MTV, Morrison only discovered Allen's involvement with the song after it had been selected as the second single and Allen tweeted that he had a song on Morrison's record. The two met on the set of Glee the week "Still Got Tonight" was released.

== Release and promotion ==
"Still Got Tonight" was one of three promotional countdown singles made available to iTunes prior to the release of Matthew Morrison. It was later released to digital retailers through The Island Def Jam Music Group on April 26, 2011 as the album's second official single. Morrison performed the song on the Glee season two finale episode, "New York", as his character Will Schuester. The song itself received average reviews, but its inclusion in the show was met with criticism for "shameless self-promotion".

== Critical reception ==
The song has received mixed to positive reviews from contemporary music critics. AllMusic and Entertainment Weekly singled "Still Got Tonight" out as a highlight of Matthew Morrison in their reviews of the album. The performance of the song on Glee was rated a B+ and B− by Anthony Benigno of independent music blog The Faster Times and Sandra Gonzalez of Entertainment Weekly, respectively.

Amanda Hensel at PopCrush rated the song 7 stars out of 10, and praised it for being "light, but passionate, heartfelt and upbeat — just how we like our pop songs, plus that 'Idol' touch." In particular, she complimented the song's chorus and described "Still Got Tonight" as superior to previous single "Summer Rain". Becky Bain at Idolator found the single to be underwhelming, writing "truth be told, we're kind of snoozing over here at all the tracks we've heard from Morrison so far."

== Chart performance ==
Chart (2011)	Peak position
UK Singles Chart (Official Charts Company)	182
US Bubbling Under Hot 100 (Billboard)	24
US Heatseekers Songs (Billboard)	22
