= The Truth (Kris Allen song) =

2010 song by Kris Allen

Single by Kris Allen featuring Pat Monahan

from the album Kris Allen
- Released: May 11, 2010
- Recorded: 2009
- Studio: The Cookie Jar & Strawberry Studios, California
- Genre: Pop rock; soft rock
- Length: 4:40 (solo album version); 4:03 (single version with Pat Monahan)
- Label: Jive
- Songwriter(s): Pat Monahan; Toby Gad
- Producer(s): Toby Gad

Kris Allen singles chronology
"Let It Be" (2010)	"The Truth" (2010)	"'Alright with Me" (2010)

Pat Monahan singles chronology
"Her Eyes" (2007)	"The Truth" (2010)	"Marry Me" (2012)

"The Truth" is a song by American recording artist Kris Allen, from his self-titled debut album. The song was written by Train frontman Pat Monahan and its producer, Toby Gad. The single version of the song, which features Monahan, was released as the album's second single on May 11, 2010.

== Background ==
In an interview with Entertainment Weekly, Allen divulged details about the single version of the song. According to Allen, it was his label's idea to switch the song up, stating, "Their idea was that Pat wrote the song, so why not get him involved in it in some way. And obviously Train is doing really well right now, and I don’t think that can be ignored. Everyone thought it was a good idea." Allen also stated it never crossed his mind to feature Monahan, commenting, "It wasn’t that type of song where you say, 'We need someone else on this.' Now that it’s done, I hope it does really well, man. I really do." He also said the song was not written as a typical duet, so the feature was not meant to come off as a duet, as listeners may think of the song as a breakup ballad between two men, therefore Monahan was added on the bridge.

"The Truth"
A sample of "The Truth" featuring vocals from Allen and Monahan.

When asked about the controversy over his fans feeling that he was victimized in the released of the single, he responded,

The people at 19 and the people at Jive have been great. I'm not gonna say there haven't been things that have happened, some conflicts. Not bad stuff — I think it's just general stuff that goes on between artists and labels or whatever. Questions that come up. I'm very new to this. But it's really nice to have fans who care about you, who want you to be done right, and for the label and management to treat you right. I think they felt like I wasn't being cared for and being respected. And I appreciate them worrying about that. But I feel like I am. I really do.

== Music video ==
The music video premiered on August 17, 2010, on VH1, and premiered on Kris' website on August 18. The video begins at a desert where Allen is seen on a bed and he walks away from the bed. Throughout the video, Monahan is shown singing at a different location of the desert. At the end of the video, Allen is singing and playing his piano in a glass filled candle lanterns, finishing the song.

== Critical reception ==
Bill Lamb of About.com gave the single a mixed review, complimenting the song's mainstream pop appeal and Allen's powerful vocals, but criticizing the song's ordinary lyrics and sound. He noted that while both "Live Like We're Dying" and Allen's song choices on American Idol fit his talents impeccably, "The Truth" makes him sound "almost like a Daughtry wannabe losing all of his own performance personality in the process." Even though Lamb thought it was wise to feature Monahan to capitalize on the success of "Hey, Soul Sister", he complained that it is difficult to distinguish Monahan from the lead vocal and questioned the artistic relevance of his presence on the track. Lamb also criticized the production and songwriting, calling the lyrics "bland", and said the production "adds no new life to words or music." He recommended Allen unleash his vocal power shown in the song "on something more unique to him as an artist."

== Chart performance ==
"The Truth" debuted at number 37 on the US Billboard Hot Adult Top 40 Tracks chart for the week of June 5, 2010.

=== Charts ===
Chart (2010)	Peak position
US Adult Pop Songs	16

== Credits and personnel ==
- Songwriting – Pat Monahan, Toby Gad
- Production – Toby Gad
- Arrangement, instruments and programming – Toby Gad
- Drums – Robin Diaz
- Violins – Jim Sitterly, Larry Greenfield
- Mixing – Serban Ghenea; John Hanes (engineered for mix), assisted by Tim Robbins

== Release history ==
Region	Date	Format
United States	May 11, 2010	Digital download
United States	June 1, 2010	Mainstream radio
