= My Weakness =

My Weakness may refer to:

- My Weakness (film), a 1933 American film
- "My Weakness", a song from the 1999 Moby album Play
- "My Weakness", a song from the 2012 Kris Allen album Thank You Camellia
