= Matthew Morrison (album) =

Studio album by Matthew Morrison
- Released: May 10, 2011
- Recorded: 2010–2011
- Genre: Pop, adult contemporary
- Length: 41:30
- Label: Mercury
- Producer: Rob Mathes, Matt Squire, Marc Shaiman, Kristian Lundin, Steve Kipner, Andrew Frampton

Matthew Morrison chronology
Matthew Morrison (2011)	Where It All Began (2013)

Singles from Matthew Morrison
- 1. "Summer Rain" Released: March 8, 2011; 2. "Still Got Tonight" Released: April 26, 2011

Matthew Morrison is the debut album of Glee star Matthew Morrison released on May 10, 2011. The song "Still Got Tonight", co-written by Kris Allen, was first released as a promo single for digital stores as a countdown to the album release along with the tracks "Over the Rainbow" (with Gwyneth Paltrow) and "Mona Lisas and Mad Hatters / Rocket Man" (with Elton John), and a month later performed at a Broadway stage by Matthew himself on the season finale of Glee (co-starred by Matthew as Will Schuester), "New York" (season 2, episode 22). "Arms of a Woman" is a cover of the Amos Lee song.

As of March 21, 2013, the album has sold 55,000 copies in the US.

== Critical reception ==
Professional ratings
Review scores
Source	Rating
AllMusic	3/5 stars
Entertainment Weekly	B−
Rolling Stone	2.5/5 stars
Slant Magazine	2/5 stars
Toronto Star	2.5/4 stars

Reviews for the album were mixed. AllMusic editor Heather Phares gave it three out of five stars, praising some of the songs like his duet with Gwyneth Paltrow for its melody for giving his voice "more to do than most of the by-the-numbers contemporary pop here" and "It's Over" for being "one of the truest expressions of his talent," but felt that the best moments - his duets with Sting and Elton John - feels like "it gives the impression that he can't carry a song without someone else." She concluded that "Ultimately, Matthew Morrison is more scattered and less fresh-feeling than the fare he sings week in and week out on Glee. Though it has plenty of appealing moments, it just doesn't capitalize on Morrison's star and vocal power." Rolling Stone's Jody Rosen said of the record: "Verdict: a mildly charming, sometimes gawky LP that will please Gleeks and befuddle everyone else. Prediction: It'll be a huge hit." Slant Magazine writer Jonathan Keefe gave criticism to the producer-driven songs for being "the most middlebrow and indistinct brand of pop that is never less than competent, but is never even the slightest bit innovative or noteworthy" and the original tracks for being "just as unmemorable," but gave positive insight on his singing voice saying "[I]t isn't that Morrison's a poor singer: He actually has a pure, pleasant tenor that's as limber and expressive as that of any seasoned stage performer."

== Track listing ==
No.	Title	Writer(s)	Producer(s)	Length
1.	"Summer Rain"	Matthew Morrison, Espen Lind, Amund Bjørklund, Claude Kelly	Espionage	3:32
2.	"Still Got Tonight"	Andrew Frampton, Steve Kipner, Kris Allen	Andrew Frampton, Steve Kipner	4:29
3.	"Let Your Soul Be Your Pilot" (with Sting)	Sting	Rob Mathes	5:30
4.	"My Name"	Morrison, Eg White	Rob Mathes	3:22
5.	"Hey"	Morrison, Kristian Lundin, Carl Falk, JC Chasez, Dylan Patrick	Kristian Lundin, Carl Falk	3:19
6.	"Over the Rainbow" (with Gwyneth Paltrow)	Harold Arlen, E. Y. Harburg	Rob Mathes	4:43
7.	"Don't Stop Dancing"	Chasez, Matt Squire, Lindy Robbins	Matt Squire	2:53
8.	"It Don't Matter to the Sun"	Gordon Kennedy, Tommy Sims, Wayne Kirkpatrick	Rob Mathes	4:32
9.	"Mona Lisas and Mad Hatters / Rocket Man" (with Elton John)	John, Bernie Taupin	Rob Mathes	6:51
10.	"It's Over"	Morrison, Marc Shaiman	Marc Shaiman	2:23

iTunes Store bonus track
No.	Title	Writer(s)	Length
11.	"A Boy Can Dream"	Zac Maloy	3:28

Amazon MP3 bonus track
No.	Title	Writer(s)	Length
11.	"Arms of a Woman"	Ryan Anthony Massaro	4:12

Barnes & Noble bonus track
No.	Title	Writer(s)	Length
11.	"Still Got Tonight" (acoustic version)	Andrew Frampton, Steve Kipner, Kris Allen	4:30

== Personnel ==
- Vocals: Matthew Morrison, Elton John, Gwyneth Paltrow, Sting
- Producer: Rob Mathes, Matt Squire, Marc Shaiman, Kristian Lundin, Steve Kipner, Andrew Frampton

== Charts ==
Chart performance for Matthew Morrison
Chart (2011)	Peak position
Australian Albums (ARIA)	61
Canadian Albums (Nielsen SoundScan)	31
Scottish Albums (OCC)	77
UK Albums (OCC)	63
US Billboard 200	24
