= Summer Rain (Matthew Morrison song) =

Single by Matthew Morrison

from the album Matthew Morrison
- Released: March 8, 2011
- Recorded: 2011
- Genre: Pop
- Label: Mercury
- Songwriters: Matthew Morrison, Claude Kelly, Espen Lind, Amund Bjørklund
- Producer: Espionage

Matthew Morrison singles chronology
"Summer Rain" (2011)	"Still Got Tonight" (2011)

"Summer Rain" is the debut single by American actor and singer Matthew Morrison. The song was written by Morrison and Claude Kelly, and co-written and produced by Espionage.

== Promotion ==
"Summer Rain" made its world premiere on February 28, 2011, on Ryan Seacrest's KIIS-FM radio show. It was made available for purchase on March 8, 2011, and Morrison made performances and promotional rounds on The Tonight Show with Jay Leno on April 6 and The Ellen DeGeneres Show on April 11. Remixes for the song have been done by Almighty Records .

== Chart performance ==
=== Weekly charts ===
Chart (2011)	Peak position
US Adult Contemporary (Billboard)	16

=== Year-end charts ===
Chart (2011)	Position
US Adult Contemporary (Billboard)	43
