= Letting You In =

Studio album by Kris Allen
- Released: March 18, 2016
- Studio: The Study and The Toy Box Studio (Nashville, Tennessee); Townsend Sound Studios (Franklin, Tennessee)
- Genre: Pop
- Length: 37:30
- Label: DogBear
- Producer: Brown Bannister; Ian Fitchuk; Konrad Snyder; Josh Jenkins; Chad Copelin

Kris Allen chronology
Horizons (2014)	Letting You In (2016)	Somethin' About Christmas (2016)

Singles from Letting You In
- 1. "Waves" Released: February 19, 2016; 2. "Love Will Find You" Released: September 19, 2016

Letting You In is the fifth studio album recorded by American singer/songwriter Kris Allen, released through the independent label imprint DogBear Records on March 18, 2016. It is Allen's second record to be released independently after parting ways with his post-American Idol label, RCA Records, in 2012. The lead single, "Waves", was released to digital retailers on February 19, 2016 alongside pre-orders of the album.

Upon release, the album was met with generally positive reviews from critics, who praised the musical and lyrical sophistication but noted a lack of personality. Letting You In entered the Billboard Independent Albums sales chart at number 17 but failed to enter the Billboard 200, though it did chart at number 88 on Top Current Albums.

== Background ==
Letting You In was recorded in Nashville, Tennessee in 2015 and serves as Allen's fourth release since winning American Idol in season eight (2009) and second since being dropped by RCA Records in 2012. Allen co-wrote every song on the record and worked on over 70 songs with multiple producers before narrowing it down the ten tracks that make up the album' final track listing. Inspired in part by his traumatic 2013 car crash (as was 2014's Horizons), the record has been described by Allen as his "most personal" yet. After re-learning the guitar, Allen also revised his songwriting strategy for this album, writing that on Letting You In he focused on "making music that was completely true to me" instead of drawing inspiration from other artists and songwriters.

== Promotion ==
"Waves" was streamed exclusively by People on February 18, 2016 as the first taste of the then-upcoming album and was released to digital retailers the following day. The album was also made available for pre-order at that time (February 19, 2016). "Waves" serves as the lead single. The music video for "Waves" was released April 19, 2016. The video was directed, filmed, edited, and graded by Matthew DeLisi and featured Elliott Sikes and Brett Taylor as actors.

Two more songs were released as promotional tracks over the next month - "Love Will Find You" on February 26, 2016 and "If We Keep Doing Nothing" on March 3, 2016. Allen launched the Letting You In 2016 Tour in support of the album on March 31, 2016 in Birmingham, AL. "Love Will Find You" was released to American hot adult contemporary radio on September 19, 2016 as the second single.

== Critical reception ==
Professional ratings
Review scores
Source	Rating
Digital Journal	A
Entertainment Weekly	B−
Popdust	4/5 stars

Letting You In received generally positive reviews from critics. Markos Papadatos of Digital Journal rated the album an A, writing that "one can tell that [Allen] poured his heart on this project," and that it is "filled with raw emotions." He further described the album as "remarkable". Jason Scott, writing for music blog Popdust, praised the varied musical influences on the album and noted that "by the hands of anyone else, it would certainly be boring," but Allen makes the eclectic soundscape work. He summed up his review with the following statement: "Where Letting You In falls short in Top 40-ready sharpness, it makes up in cutting honesty and powerful images."

A more mixed review came from Madison Vain of Entertainment Weekly, who bestowed the album a B− rating. Vain noted the lack of personality developed by Allen in his post-Idol releases, which Letting You In is "unlikely to help." She praised Allen's vocals but criticized his "relentless cheerfulness," deeming the album too one-note.

== Track listing ==
Letting You In track listing
No.	Title	Writer(s)	Producer(s)	Length
1.	"Love Will Find You"	Kris Allen; Josh Jenkins		3:18
2.	"Time Will Come"	Allen; Jordan Critz; Adam Hambrick		4:04
3.	"Waves"	Allen	Jenkins	3:57
4.	"Faster Shoes"	Allen; Tofer Brown		3:13
5.	"If We Keep Doing Nothing"	Allen; K.S. Rhoads		3:59
6.	"Way Up High"	Allen		4:04
7.	"Feeling This Way"	Allen; Bryan Shackle; Mat Sherman		3:39
8.	"Letting You In"	Allen; Andy Albert; Matt Menefee		4:22
9.	"Move"	Allen; Shackle; Chuck Butler		3:22
10.	"I Remember You"	Allen; Simon Gugala; Garrison Starr		3:15
Total length:				37:30

== Personnel ==
Performers and musicians

- Kris Allen – all vocals
- Ian Fitchuk – keyboards, synthesizers, programming, drums, percussion
- Konrad Snyder – programming
- K.S. Rhoads – keyboards (5), vibraphone (5), string arrangements (5, 8)
- Kris Donegan – electric guitars
- Todd Lombardo – acoustic guitars
- Tony Lucido – bass
- Cara Fox – cello (5, 8)
- Zach Casebolt – violin (5, 8)

Technical

- Josh Jenkins – producer (1)
- Ian Fitchuk – producer, engineer
- Konrad Snyder – producer, engineer, mixing
- Chad Copelin – additional production (3)
- Brown Bannister – vocal producer
- Lij Shaw – string engineer (5, 8)
- K.S. Rhoads – additional engineer (5)
- Andrew Mendelson – mastering at Georgetown Masters (Nashville, Tennessee)
- Andrew Darby – mastering assistant
- Adam Grover – mastering assistant
- Gabe Millman – mastering assistant

== Charts ==
Weekly chart performance for Letting You In
Chart (2016)	Peak position
US Independent Albums (Billboard)	17
US Top Current Albums (Billboard)	88

== Release history ==
Horizons release history
Region	Date	Format(s)	Label	Catalog No.	Ref(s)
United States	March 18, 2016	Compact disc	DogBear Records	#38119	
Worldwide	March 18, 2016	Digital download	DogBear Records	—N/a	
