= The Vision of Love =

Single by Kris Allen

from the album Thank You Camellia
- Released: March 26, 2012
- Recorded: 2012 at The Ox, North Hollywood, California
- Genre: Pop rock
- Length: 3:34
- Label: 19/RCA
- Songwriters: Kris Allen, Adam Messinger, Nasri Atweh
- Producer: The Messengers

Kris Allen singles chronology
"Alright with Me" (2010)	"The Vision of Love" (2012)	"Prove It to You" (2014)

"The Vision of Love" is Kris Allen's first single from his second studio album Thank You Camellia. It was released as a CD single, digital download, and to Hot AC radio on March 26, 2012.

== Background ==
On March 2, 2012, Allen announced he was to release an unnamed single. He later revealed the title and the release date. The song was written by Allen, Adam Messinger and Nasri Atweh.

== Track listing ==
No.	Title	Length
1.	"The Vision of Love"	3:34
2.	"The Vision of Love (Maison & Dragen Radio Edit) - Walmart exclusive "	3:46

The Vision of Love Remix EP
No.	Title	Length
1.	"The Vision of Love (Michael Woods Remix)"	6:45
2.	"The Vision of Love (Maison and Dragen Remix)"	6:20
3.	"The Vision of Love (Religion Remix)"	6:18
4.	"The Vision of Love (Project 46 Remix)"	4:28
5.	"The Vision of Love (DJ Reidiculous - Remix Contest Winner)"	5:29
6.	"The Vision of Love (Dirrty Panda Remix - Remix Contest Runner-up)"	4:50

== Music video ==
The music video was directed by Lenny Bass and shot in downtown Los Angeles, CA on March 13, 2012. The video premiered on April 4, 2012 on Allen's official Vevo page.

The video for "The Vision of Love" presents the storyline of two teens, one insecure and lonely, the other tormented by bullying, and ultimately shows how acts of kindness help those suffering find inner strength and confidence. The scenes of the teens are interwoven with Kris performing the song in an empty loft.

== Promotion ==
Allen performed "The Vision of Love" live for the first time at The Mint in Los Angeles on February 9, 2012. On April 4, 2012 he performed "The Vision Of Love" on Billboard.com's The Music Insider.

Allen performed "The Vision of Love" and other new material from his forthcoming album at the “Live in the Vineyard” festival on April 13, 2012 at the Uptown Theater, in Napa, CA, alongside Jason Mraz, Mat Kearney, Jon McLaughlin and others.

Allen appeared on the American Idol television show on April 19, 2012 performing the single as a part of the Top 7 results show.

== Credits and personnel ==
Credits are adapted from the liner notes of "The Vision of Love".

Recording

- Recorded at The Ox, North Hollywood, California

Personnel

- Kris Allen – Vocals & acoustic guitars
- Adam Messinger - All other instrumentation
- The Messengers – Production
- Phil Tan – Mixing
- Daniela Rivera – Additional/assistant engineering

Maison & Dragen Radio Remix

- Remix & Additional Production by Maison & Dragen

A&R

- Keith Naftaly & Rob Inadomi

Management

- 19 Entertainment

== Commercial performance ==
As of April 21, 2012, 21,000 copies of the single have been downloaded in the US.

== Charts ==
The Vision of Love charted at number three on Billboard's Hot Single Sales dated April 14, 2012.

=== Weekly charts ===
Chart (2012)	Peak position
US Adult Pop Airplay (Billboard)	29
US Hot Dance Singles Sales (Billboard)	5

== Release history ==
Region	Date	Format
United Kingdom	March 25, 2012	Digital download
United States	March 26, 2012	Digital download, CD single, and Hot AC radio
United States	May 29, 2012	Digital Remixes EP
