= Lenachka =

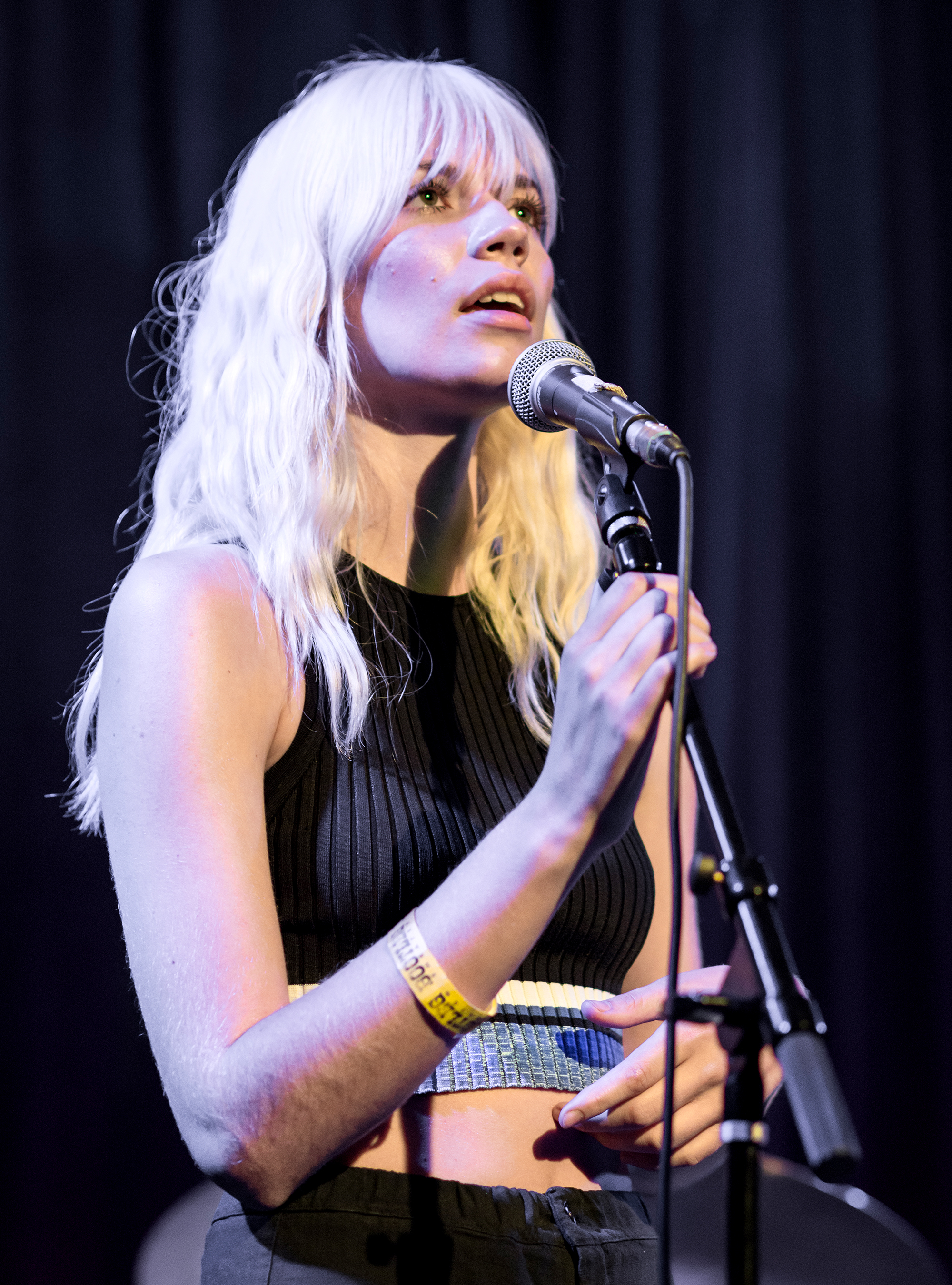

Background information
- Birth name: Helene Immel
- Born: Germany
- Genres: Pop
- Occupations: Singer; songwriter
- Years active: 2012–present
- Website: lenachkaofficial.com

Helene Immel, better known by her professional name Lenachka, is a German-born American singer based in Los Angeles and Nashville.

== Life and career ==
=== Early life ===
Born in Germany to Russian parents, both with a musical background, Lenachka moved to the United States with her parents when she was 8 years old. She is the oldest of 7 children. Her professional name comes from a Russian term of endearment her mother would often refer to her as. Lenachka is bilingual, and speaks Russian and English.

=== 2012-present ===
After hearing her cover of "Safe & Sound" by Taylor Swift and The Civil Wars, producer Charlie Peacock discovered Lenachka in 2012. Since meeting Peacock, Lenachka has co-written with artists such as Kris Allen, Winston Marshall, Jason Reeves, and Mat Kearney. She released her first EP in September 2014, which rose to #6 on the iTunes singer/songwriter chart. Lenachka is featured on Kris Allen's debut single "Prove It To You," and EDM duo BRKLYN's song "Steal Your Heart", released in November 2015. In addition to writing and recording music, Lenachka also works as a receptionist as well as a driver for Uber and Lyft. Lenachka's cover of Hall & Oates' "Private Eyes" appears in a trailer for the 2017 film The Circle. The song was produced by Tim Myers of OneRepublic.

== Discography ==
- "Private Eyes" - single (2016)
- Lenachka - EP (2014)
