= Kris Allen (album) =

Studio album by Kris Allen
- Released: November 17, 2009
- Studio: Various: Phantom Studios (Westlake Village, California); Cookie Jar Recording (Studio City, California); Sunset Sound and Conway Studios (Hollywood, California); NRG Studios and Larrabee Sound Studios (North Hollywood, California); Harmony Studios, Swing House Studios, DeathStar Studios and Chalice Recording Studios (Los Angeles, California); Glenwood Place Studios (Burbank, California); Strawberrybee Studios, Legacy Recording Studios and Germano Studios (New York City, New York); Mix One Studios (Boston, Massachusetts); MixStar Studios (Virginia Beach, Virginia); Modern Dirt Laboratories and Olympic Studios (London, UK); Studio Elevator Nobody (Göteborg, Sweden)
- Genre: Pop rock; alternative rock
- Length: 48:05
- Label: Jive; 19
- Producer: Andrew Frampton; Steve Kipner; Greg Kurstin; Mike Elizondo; Toby Gad; Eg White; Mike Flynn; Warren Huart; Tobias Karlsson; Joe King; Salaam Remi

Kris Allen chronology
Brand New Shoes (2007)	Kris Allen (2009)	Thank You Camellia (2012)

Singles from Thank You Camellia
- 1. "Live Like We're Dying" Released: September 21, 2009; 2. "The Truth" Released: May 11, 2010; 3. "Alright with Me" Released: October 13, 2010

Kris Allen is the second album from American Idol eighth season winner Kris Allen. It was released on November 17, 2009, through Jive Records.

== Background ==
Allen has writing credits on nine of the twelve tracks on the album, including one solo credit for "Red Guitar", a song that he wrote prior to participating in American Idol. "Is It Over" was written by Allen with Cale Mills, who is an Arkansas friend of the Idol champ. According to a preview of the album, the tracks are:

big, widescreen adult-alt-pop records reminiscent of VH1 house bands like Carolina Liar, Maroon 5, or Augustana, all full of huge hooky choruses ridiculously readymade for radio. The album is positively teeming with potential hits, and the folks at 19 will have a tough job selecting a follow-up single for the already-released 'Live Like We're Dying'.

In a break with American Idol tradition, Allen's Idol "coronation song", "No Boundaries", was not included on his major-label debut, becoming only the second Idol winner album to do so after Taylor Hicks' self-titled album. Instead, a newly recorded version of "Heartless", covered by Allen during his run on Idol, was included as a bonus track. There has been speculation that this was because "No Boundaries" was already included on the Walmart-exclusive season 8 compilation album, which is the first time the winning single was included on the season's compilation since Kelly Clarkson in 2002 and is the first new compilation since season five. However, it has been included as part of the deluxe album version via iTunes.

The album was released in the United Kingdom on November 16, 2009, making its official release before that of the United States.

== Promotion ==
Allen previewed three songs from his album "Written All Over My Face", "Can't Stay Away," and "Before We Come Undone" at a Miami Dolphins tailgate party before their game against the New Orleans Saints on October 25, 2009. AOL Music began streaming the full album on November 9, 2009.

=== Singles ===
- "Live Like We're Dying", a cover of The Script's song, was released digitally via iTunes on September 25, 2009. The music video for the single was released on November 6, 2009, on AOL's PopEater. The song peaked at number eighteen on the Billboard Hot 100, number ten on Pop Songs, twenty-one on Christian Songs, and other Billboard charts. It also charted internationally in Canada and New Zealand.
- "The Truth", featuring Patrick Monahan, the lead singer of the Grammy award-winning rock band Train, was released as the CD's second single in May.
- On October 6, 2010, Allen revealed on his Twitter account that the third single of the album will be "Alright with Me". He posted an unofficial music video for the song on his website on November 18, 2010, to thank his fans for their support.

== Critical reception ==
Professional ratings
Aggregate scores
Source	Rating
Metacritic	52/100
Review scores
Source	Rating
AllMusic	3/5 stars
American Songwriter	3/5 stars
Entertainment Weekly	B−
Los Angeles Times	1.5/4 stars
Rolling Stone	2/5 stars
Salt Lake Tribune	D
Slant Magazine	2/5 stars
Sputnikmusic	2/5 stars

Kris Allen was met with "mixed or average" reviews from critics. At Metacritic, which assigns a weighted average rating out of 100 to reviews from mainstream publications, this release received an average score of 52 based on 8 reviews.

In a review for AllMusic, critic Stephen Thomas Erlewine wrote: "Unhip it may be by design, at least Kris Allen delivers the goods: it's tuneful and likeable, melodic enough to merit a close listen, ready to slip into the background at a moment's notice." Writing for The Boston Globe, Ken Capobianco called the album a "polite mix of soft rock with hints of boundary jumping that, unfortunately, never truly come. There's really nothing wrong with the set; it's sweetly executed and produced. Allen sings well but shows little of the expressiveness he needs to give real meaning to the songs of yearning or loss ("The Truth") [...] Allen can and, most likely, will do better, but he has to figure out a musical direction that will help him make his own strong statement." Entertainment Weekly editor Whitney Pastorek wrote that "on his post-Idol debut, the season 8 champion sniffs around a musical identity but never quite curls up in one. Despite scoring writing credits on an impressive nine of these 13 tracks, Kris Allen gets himself stylistically lost [...], while rarely visiting original territory."

Jon Caramanica from The New York Times found that Kris Allen was a "seamless continuation of his Idol run, full of gentle songs that he only rarely tries to rough up. The flattening of the recording process suits him well [...] Allen is still accomplishing more with less." Barry Walters, writing for Rolling Stone felt that the album was "the definition of "not bad": Songs like "Can't Stay Away" and "Before We Come Undone" make no mistakes but are utterly forgettable. The highs on uptempo single "Live Like We're Dying" are heartfelt, but you can't help thinking the track's title is a cruel joke; most of the time Allen's radio-friendly tenor just sounds like it's on autopilot. The likability that helped Allen win last season is so carefully low-key here that it's nearly lost." Los Angeles Times critic Mikael Wood wrote that "most of the material [...] tends toward a flavorless pop-rock sound that doesn't even do much to flatter Allen's appealingly rumpled vocals." Slant Magazine's Jonathan Keefe found that Kris Allen was "another lackluster, characterless Idol debut" and concluded: "Exactly the kind of pleasant and ultimately forgettable album that most of his American Idol performances predicted he would make, Kris Allen is at least a slightly better John Mayer album than the new John Mayer album."

== Chart performance ==
Kris Allen debuted at number eleven on the US Billboard 200, with first weeks sales of 80,000 units. It marked the lowest opening-week sales of any American Idol winner up to then. By September 2012, the album had sold 346,000 domestically.

== Track listing ==
Kris Allen track listing
No.	Title	Writer(s)	Producer(s)	Length
1.	"Live Like We're Dying"	Steve Kipner; Andrew Frampton, Danny O’Donoghue; Mark Sheehan	Frampton; Kipner	3:29
2.	"Before We Come Undone"	Kris Allen; Lindy Robbins; Greg Kurstin	Kurstin	3:31
3.	"Can't Stay Away"	Allen; Robbins; Mike Elizondo	Elizondo	3:19
4.	"The Truth"	Pat Monahan; Toby Gad	Gad	4:40
5.	"Written All Over My Face"	Kipner; Frampton; O'Donoghue; Sheehan	Frampton; Kipner	3:34
6.	"Bring It Back"	Allen; Francis White	Eg White	3:42
7.	"Red Guitar"	Allen	Mike Flynn; Warren Huart	4:27
8.	"Is It Over"	Allen; Elizondo; Cale Mills	Elizondo	3:34
9.	"Let It Rain"	Allen; Tobias Karlsson	Karlsson	3:29
10.	"Alright with Me"	Allen; Joe King	Flynn; King	3:07
11.	"Lifetime"	Allen; Elizondo; Jon Foreman	Elizondo	3:38
12.	"I Need to Know"	Allen; Robbins; Gad	Gad	3:34

International bonus track
No.	Title	Writer(s)	Producer(s)	Length
13.	"Heartless"	Malik Yusef El Shabbaz Jones; Scott Mescudi; Kanye West; Ernest Wilson; Jeffrey Bhasker; Benjamin McIldowiell	Salaam Remi	3:42

Japan bonus track
No.	Title	Writer(s)	Producer(s)	Length
13.	"Heartless"	Jones; Mescudi; West; Wilson; Bhasker; McIldowiell	Salaam Remi	3:42
14.	"No Boundaries"	Kara DioGuardi; Cathy Dennis; Mitch Allan	Emanuel Kiriakou	3:30

Walmart bonus track
No.	Title	Writer(s)	Producer(s)	Length
13.	"Heartless"	Jones; Mescudi; West; Wilson; Bhasker; McIldowiell	Salaam Remi	3:42
14.	"Send Me All Your Angels"	Allen; Chris Daughtry; Elizondo	Elizondo	3:29

iTunes pre-order bonus track
No.	Title	Writer(s)	Producer(s)	Length
14.	"From the Ashes"	Allen; Robbins; Gad	Gad	4:06

iTunes deluxe edition bonus track
No.	Title	Writer(s)	Producer(s)	Length
15.	"No Boundaries"	DioGuardi; Dennis; Allan	Kiriakou	3:30

== Credits and personnel ==
Performers and musicians

- Kris Allen – vocals, guitars (6, 13)
- Steve Kipner – keyboards (1, 5)
- Andrew Frampton – keyboards (1, 5), acoustic guitar (1, 5), programming (5), electric guitar (5)
- Greg Kurstin – keyboards (2), programming (2), guitars (2), bass (2)
- Mike Elizondo – keyboards (3, 11, 14), programming (3, 11, 14), electric guitar (3), bass (3, 8, 11, 14), acoustic guitar (14)
- Zac Rae – keyboards (3, 7, 8, 10, 11, 14), acoustic piano (7, 10), synthesizers (7, 10)
- Toby Gad – programming (4, 12), instruments (4, 12), arrangements (4, 12)
- Eg White – instruments (6), guitars (6)
- Johan Carlsson – keyboards (9)
- Salaam Remi – keyboards (13), bass (13), drums (13), arrangements (13)
- Paul Inder – electric guitar (1)
- Mark Sheehan – electric guitar (1, 5), programming (5)
- Joel Shearer – electric guitar (3, 11, 14), acoustic guitar (3)
- Tim Pierce – guitars (7, 10)
- Michael Ward – electric guitar (8), acoustic guitar (8)
- Jordan Wright – guitar solo (8)
- Tobias Karlsson – additional guitars (9), bass (9)
- Bill Lefler – guitars (9), drums (9)
- David Levita – guitar solo (10)
- Jon Foreman – acoustic guitar (11)
- Paul Broucek – guitars (13)
- Danny O'Donoghue – bass (1, 5), backing vocals [credited as Billy Sollux] (1, 5), programming (5), electric guitar (5)
- Sean Hurley – bass (7, 10)
- Glen Power – drums (1)
- Randy Cooke – drums (2)
- Aaron Sterling – drums (3, 8, 11, 14)
- Robin Diaz – drums (4, 12)
- Victor Indrizzo – drums (7, 10), percussion (7, 10)
- Larry Greenfield – violin (4, 12)
- Jim Sitterly – violin (4, 12)
- Mattias Johansson – violin (9)
- Mats Lindberg – cello (9)
- Victor Lawrence – cello (12)
- Irene Bylund – viola (9)
- Mattias Bylund – string arrangements (9)
- David Ralicke – baritone saxophone (10), tenor saxophone (10), trombone (10), horn arrangements (10)
- Chris Bautista – trumpet (10)

Technical

- Jeff Fenster – A&R
- Dan Frampton – engineer (1, 5)
- Ted Paduck – engineer (1, 5)
- Spike Stent – mixing (1, 5)
- Greg Kursitn – recording (2)
- Eric Weaver – vocal recording (2)
- John Hanes – mix engineer (2, 4, 6, 7, 9, 10, 12)
- Serban Ghenea – mixing (2, 4, 6, 7, 9, 10, 12)
- Adam Hawkins – engineer (3, 8, 11, 14), mixing (3, 8, 11, 14)
- Toby Gad – engineer (4, 12)
- Christian Baker – engineer (5)
- Warren Huart – engineer (7, 10), recording (7, 10)
- Craig Frank – engineer (9)
- Mattais Bylynd – string recording and editing (9)
- Franklin Emmanuel Socorro – recording (13)
- Manny Marroquin – mixing (13)
- Tim Roberts – mix assistant (2, 4, 6, 7, 9, 10, 12)
- Brent Arrowood – assistant engineer (3, 8, 11, 14)
- Phil Allen – assistant engineer (7, 10)
- Robin Holden – assistant engineer (7, 10)
- Graham Hope – assistant engineer (7, 10)
- Christian Plata – mix assistant (13)
- Tom Coyne – mastering at Sterling Sound (New York, NY)
- Chiara Krammer – production coordinator
- Jolie Levine – project coordinator
- Keki Mingus – creative director
- Maria Paula Marulanda – art direction
- Jackie Murphy – art direction
- Eric Ogden – photography
- Simon Fuller – management
- Stirling McIIwaine – management

== Charts ==
=== Weekly charts ===
Weekly chart performance for Kris Allen
Chart (2009)	Peak position
Canadian Albums (Billboard)	50
US Billboard 200	11

=== Year-end charts ===
Year-end chart performance for Kris Allen
Chart (2010)	Position
US Billboard 200	115

== Release history ==
Kris Allen release history
Region	Date	Format(s)	Label	Edition(s)	Ref.
United Kingdom	November 16, 2009	CD; digital download	RCA; Sony Music Entertainment	Standard	
Canada	November 17, 2009	CD; digital download	Jive; 19	Standard	
United States	November 17, 2009	CD; digital download	Jive; 19	Standard; Walmart bonus track	
New Zealand	November 23, 2009	CD; digital download	Zomba; Sony Music Entertainment	Standard	
