= No Boundaries (song) =

2009 single by Kris Allen

Single by Kris Allen
- Released: May 20, 2009
- Recorded: 2009
- Genre: Pop rock
- Length: 3:30
- Label: Sony Music
- Songwriters: Kara DioGuardi; Cathy Dennis; Mitch Allan
- Producer: Emanuel Kiriakou

Kris Allen singles chronology
"No Boundaries" (2009)	"Live Like We're Dying" (2009)

"No Boundaries"

Single by Adam Lambert
- Released: May 20, 2009
- Recorded: 2009
- Genre: Rock
- Length: 3:48
- Label: Sony Music
- Songwriters: Kara DioGuardi; Cathy Dennis; Mitch Allan
- Producer: Emanuel Kiriakou

Adam Lambert singles chronology
"No Boundaries" (2009)	"Time for Miracles" (2009)

Audio video
- "No Boundaries" on YouTube

"No Boundaries" is the 2009 winner's single of season 8 of the reality television show American Idol. It was co-written by American Idol judge Kara DioGuardi, along with Cathy Dennis, and Mitch Allan. It is the first single for winner Kris Allen and runner-up Adam Lambert.

It was first performed on the May 19th American Idol final performance show by the season's winner Kris Allen, as well as the show's runner-up, Adam Lambert. A demo performed by Kara DioGuardi herself has leaked onto the Internet as well, but remains officially unreleased. Both Lambert's and Allen's versions of the song, however, were released to digital music retailers on May 20, 2009.

It is the second American Idol winner single that was released by both winner and runner-up. The first single was "Inside Your Heaven" of season 4, released by winner Carrie Underwood and runner-up Bo Bice.

It is also the second American Idol winner single that is not on the debut album of the winner, after Taylor Hicks' "Do I Make You Proud" in 2006, although the song is included in the deluxe edition of Kris Allen's debut album.

It was performed on Britain's Got Talent by young boy band Connected.

== Reception ==
The song overall has received mixed reviews. Between Kris Allen's version and Adam Lambert's version, Allen's has sold more digital downloads to date.

Former American Idol producer Nigel Lythgoe described hearing the song as the "only downside" of American Idol's Grand Finale. Misha Berson of The Seattle Times called the song "perhaps the most tuneless, hackneyed earful of 'inspirational' junk that any American Idol has been saddled with in their last chance at victory".

The lyrics of the song have attracted particular criticism, with Gil Kaufman of MTV describing them as "a titanic mound of turgid clichés", citing the chorus "every step you climb another mountain / every breath is harder to believe / you’ll make it through the pain / weather the hurricane / to get to that one thing / when you think the road is going nowhere / just when you’ve almost gave [sic] up on your dreams / then take it by the hand and show you that you can".

Billboard reviewed each version separately. On Allen's version, they gave a mixed review, by saying "Even though Allen sings lines like 'there are no boundaries,' his modest presentation implicitly recognizes there actually are. And though he sings he will 'climb another mountain,' this is a vocalist who will reach that peak with a trained, experienced guide." On Lambert's version, they gave a positive review, by saying "There's a slight hitch in his voice, but Lambert gets more comfortable as the rock-of-the-'80s orchestration builds to mind-boggling crescendos. Throwing caution to the wind, and maybe even leaving his cake out in the rain, Lambert shows on this towering if inelegant power ballad he can 'weather the hurricane.' HuffPost called this song "regrettable" when comparing it to his song, released as single in 2011, "Aftermath".

Allen's single has sold 312,000 copies.

== Track listing ==
No Boundaries – Single (Kris Allen version)

1. "No Boundaries": 3:30

No Boundaries – Single (Adam Lambert version)

1. "No Boundaries": 3:48

No Boundaries - Demo (Kara DioGuardi version/demo)

1. "No Boundaries": 3:36

== Release history ==
Both versions

Region	Date
Austria	May 20, 2009
Canada	May 20, 2009
United States	May 20, 2009
Australia	May 22, 2009
Finland	May 22, 2009
United Kingdom	May 22, 2009
Philippines	May 26, 2009
Sweden	May 26, 2009

== Chart performance ==
Kris Allen

Allen's version of "No Boundaries" entered the Billboard Hot 100 for the week of May 29, 2009, at number 11, selling 134,000 paid digital downloads. Also, during the same chart week, the song made its debut at number 27 on the Billboard Adult Contemporary charts.

Chart (2009)	Peak position
Canada (Canadian Hot 100)	13
UK Singles Chart	92
US Billboard Hot 100	11
US Billboard Adult Contemporary	19

Adam Lambert

Lambert's version of "No Boundaries" entered the Billboard Hot 100 for the week of May 29, 2009, at number 72, with sales of approximately 36,000 downloads.

Chart (2009)	Peak position
Canada (Canadian Hot 100)	52
New Zealand RIANZ Singles Chart	38
US Billboard Hot 100	72
