= Matthew Morrison =

American actor, dancer, and singer (born 1978)

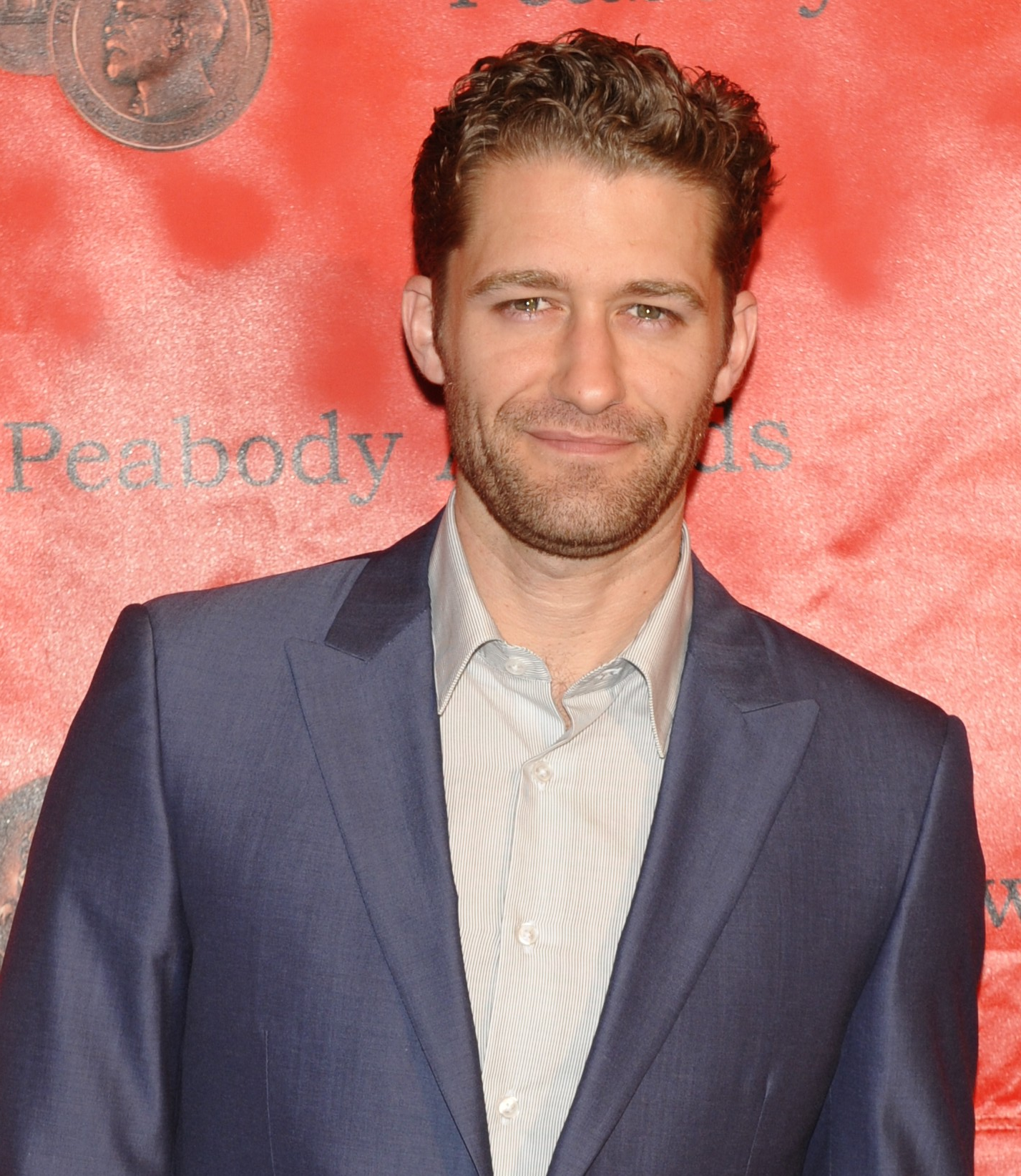
- Morrison at the 2010 Peabody Awards
- Born: Matthew James Morrison; October 30, 1978 (age 48); Fort Ord, California, U.S.
- Education: New York University (attended)
- Occupations: Actor; dancer; singer
- Years active: 1997–present
- Spouse: Renee Puente (m. 2014)
- Children: 2
- Musical career
- Genres: Pop; jazz soul; pop standards
- Instrument: Vocals
- Labels: Mercury; 222 Records

Matthew James Morrison (born October 30, 1978) is an American actor, dancer, and singer, best known for his role as Will Schuester on the Fox television show Glee (2009–2015).

Morrison has starred in multiple Broadway and off-Broadway productions. He appeared as Link Larkin in the original Broadway cast of Hairspray (2002), as Fabrizio Nacarelli in the original Broadway cast of the musical The Light in the Piazza (2005), for which he received a Tony Award nomination, and in the starring role of J.M. Barrie in the original Broadway cast of Finding Neverland (2015-2016). In April 2026, he returned to Broadway as Bobby Darin in Just in Time replacing Jonathan Groff.

He starred as the Grinch in NBC's 2020 production Dr. Seuss' The Grinch Musical Live!. He has also been a judge on two reality dance competition shows on TV: The Greatest Dancer on BBC One, and So You Think You Can Dance on Fox.

Morrison signed with Adam Levine's 222 Records in 2012, and has released three solo albums: Matthew Morrison (2011), Where It All Began (2013), and Disney Dreamin' with Matthew Morrison (2020).

== Early life ==
Morrison was born in Fort Ord, California, the son of Mary Louise (Fraser) and Thomas Morrison. Morrison was raised in Chico, and has Scottish and English ancestry. He was a member of Buena Park Youth theater, located in Buena Park. He was part of the Collaborative Arts Project 21 (CAP21) and the Orange County School of the Arts, while at the Los Alamitos High School campus. While in high school, Morrison did a musical with actress Jodie Sweetin. He attended New York University's Tisch School of the Arts for two years before dropping out and joining the Broadway adaptation of Footloose.

== Career ==
In 1999, while still at NYU, Morrison appeared on Late Show with David Letterman and Total Request Live as one of five members of the fictional parody boy band "Fresh Step", an act that was conceived by several Late Show writers. The choreographer hired for "Fresh Step" was also the choreographer for the Broadway musical Footloose, and helped Morrison to get cast in Footloose later that year. Morrison dropped out of NYU to begin appearing in the show.

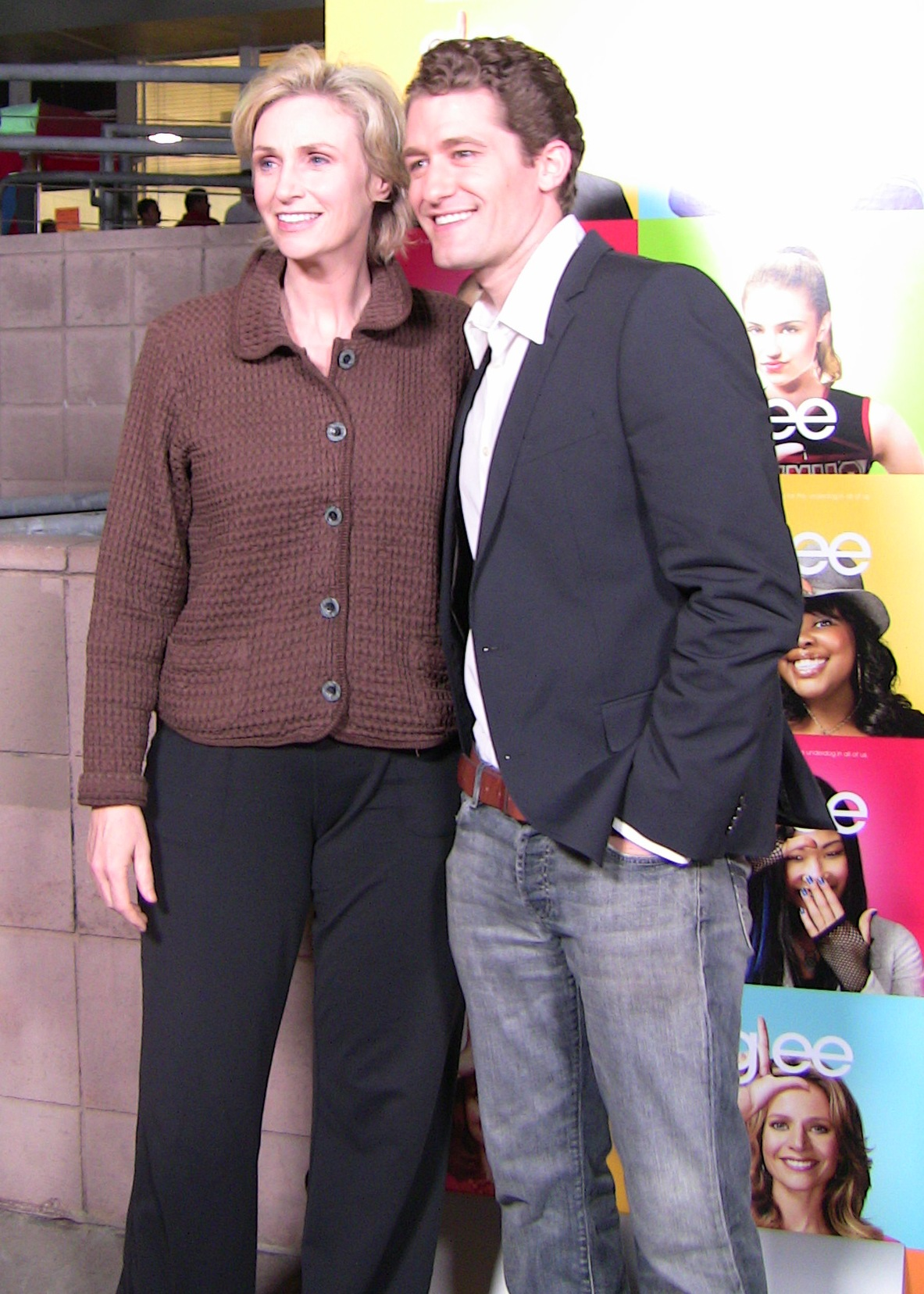
Morrison with Glee co-star Jane Lynch

In 2001, Morrison was recruited to join the boy band LMNT, turning it from a trio into a quartet. He stayed in the band for one year, then left and was replaced by Jonas Persch; he left before the recording of the group's sole album, All Sides. In a 2010 interview, Morrison stated about the experience, "It was the worst year of my life. You know when you're a performer and you're out there on stage and you're embarrassed that you're doing something wrong. It was pretty bad."

Morrison briefly appeared in a revival of The Rocky Horror Show in 2002. He then starred in the original cast of the musical Hairspray as Link Larkin from its opening in 2002 through January 2004. In 2005, Morrison starred as Fabrizio Nacarelli in the Broadway premiere of Adam Guettel's musical The Light in the Piazza; he was nominated for a Tony Award for his performance. He left the show on August 28, 2005.

Morrison started working in television, guest-starring on shows such as Ghost Whisperer, Numbers, CSI: Miami, and Hack. Morrison also had small roles in films including Marci X (2003). He also appeared as Sir Harry in the 2005 ABC-TV production of Once Upon a Mattress, starring Tracey Ullman, Zooey Deschanel and Carol Burnett.

He earned a Drama Desk Nomination for his role in the Off Broadway show 10 Million Miles which ran at the Atlantic Theater Company in 2007. That same year he appeared in two films: Dan in Real Life, followed by Music and Lyrics as Cora Corman's manager. In 2008, he played Lieutenant Cable in a Lincoln Center production of the musical South Pacific. He left the production at the end of 2008 and in early 2009 returned to California to shoot the first season of Glee.

Morrison played Will Schuester in the Fox Broadcasting television series Glee, which had its television preview on May 19, 2009. Schuester is a high school Spanish (later History) teacher who takes on the task of restoring the school's glee club to its former glory. He made his directorial debut with the third season's ninth episode.

In January 2010, Morrison signed a solo record deal with Mercury Records. His first studio album, Matthew Morrison, was released on May 10, 2011. Two singles were released from the album, "Summer Rain" and "Still Got Tonight". The album also includes duets with Elton John (a medley of "Mona Lisas and Mad Hatters" and "Rocket Man"), Gwyneth Paltrow ("Over the Rainbow") and Sting ("Let Your Soul Be Your Pilot"). On June 16, 2010, Morrison joined Leona Lewis—appearing at London's O2 Arena as part of her world tour—for a one-off performance to sing "Over the Rainbow".

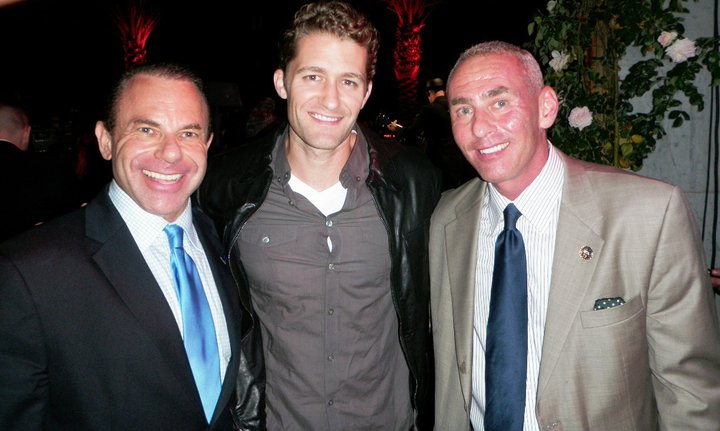
Morrison (center) with LGBT activist couple Kevin and Don Norte at a PFLAG fundraiser in 2010

In March 2012, Morrison was featured in a performance of Dustin Lance Black's play, 8—a staged reenactment of the federal trial that overturned California's Prop 8 ban on same-sex marriage—as Paul Katami. The production was held at the Wilshire Ebell Theatre and broadcast on YouTube to raise money for the American Foundation for Equal Rights.

A Morrison concert at Connecticut's Bushnell Center was recorded and aired on PBS in June 2013. In April 2013, Morrison appeared at the 2013 Laurence Olivier Awards at the Royal Opera House in London.

On June 4, 2013, 222 Records released Morrison's second studio album, Where It All Began, an album of show tunes and jazz standards. One single was released from the album, a cover of "It Don't Mean a Thing".

Morrison returned to Broadway as J. M. Barrie in the Broadway debut of the musical Finding Neverland, which opened in April 2015.

On July 7, 2016, Morrison appeared alongside Megan Hilty in a summer evening of Broadway and other songs with The New York Pops at the Forest Hills Stadium in Forest Hills, Queens.

Morrison was a "dance captain" on BBC One's The Greatest Dancer, which aired for two seasons in 2019 and 2020, alongside Cheryl, Oti Mabuse and, in the second season, Todrick Hall as well. In the second half of 2019, he portrayed Trevor in the ninth season of the FX horror anthology television series American Horror Story.

In December 2020, he starred as The Grinch in NBC's production of Dr. Seuss' The Grinch Musical Live!.

On April 4, 2022, he was announced as a judge for the seventeenth season of So You Think You Can Dance, along with JoJo Siwa and Stephen "tWitch" Boss. However, on May 27, he was fired from the show. His final episode aired on June 8, and he was replaced by actress Leah Remini. Amidst claims that he had sent an inappropriate text message, Morrison posted an Instagram video in June 2022, where he claimed that his messages were just friendly, and that he was dismissed for other reasons.

In June 2023, it was announced that Morrison would star alongside Jen Lilley in the TV film A Paris Christmas Waltz, which aired on Great American Family in November 2023. Morrison starred in the independent thriller From Embers. He played Billy Flynn in a limited engagement of Chicago in Japan from April 18–21, 2024, at the Orix Theater in Osaka, and then April 25–May 5 at the Tokyu Theater Orb. From April 1-19, 2026, Morrision starred as Bobby Darin in the Broadway production of Just in Time. He’ll reprise the role from October 20 to November 8, 2026.

== Personal life ==
Morrison became engaged to actress Chrishell Stause on December 9, 2006. Their relationship later ended. He began dating Lea Michele prior to their appearances on Glee, which Michele confirmed in her 2014 memoir.

In 2011, Morrison began dating Renee Puente. On June 27, 2013, Elton John helped Morrison announce that he and Puente were engaged. Morrison and Puente were married on October 18, 2014, at a private home on the island of Maui.

On May 16, 2017, it was revealed on his personal Instagram account that he and Puente were expecting their first child. Their son was born on October 22, 2017. On March 16, 2021, Morrison used his Instagram again to announce that he and Puente were expecting their second child together following a series of miscarriages. Their daughter was born on June 28, 2021.

== Discography ==
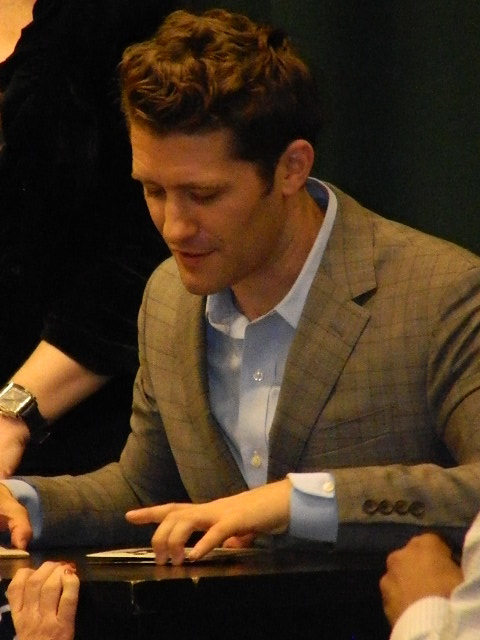
Matthew Morrison visiting Barnes & Noble for a CD release party, 2013

=== Studio albums ===
Title	Details	Peak chart positions				
Title	Details	US	US Indie	US Kid	AUS	UK
Matthew Morrison	Release date: May 10, 2011; Label: Mercury Records; Formats: CD, music download	24	14	—	61	63
Where It All Began	Release date: June 4, 2013; Label: 222 Records; Formats: CD, music download	95	—			163
Disney Dreamin' with Matthew Morrison	Release date: March 6, 2020; Label: Walt Disney Records; Formats: CD, digital download	—		7	—	
"—" denotes releases that did not chart

=== EPs ===
Title	Details
A Classic Christmas	Release date: November 19, 2013; Label: 222 Records; Formats: music download
"—" denotes releases that did not chart

=== Singles ===
Year	Single	Peak chart positions			Album
Year	Single	US Bub.	US AC	UK	Album
2011	"Summer Rain"	—	16	—	Matthew Morrison
2011	"Still Got Tonight"	24	—	182	Matthew Morrison
2013	"It Don't Mean a Thing"	—			Where It All Began
"—" denotes releases that did not chart

== Theatre ==
Year	Production	Role	Venue	Notes
1998	Footloose	Ensemble; Chuck Cranston understudy	Broadway	Replacement
1999	Footloose	Chuck Cranston; Ren McCormack understudy	US tour	Replacement
2000	The Rocky Horror Show	Phantom	Broadway	Replacement
2001	Sunday in the Park with George	Franz / Dennis	Regional	
2002–2004	Hairspray	Link Larkin	Broadway	Originated role
2003	Tarzan	Tarzan	NY workshop	
2004	Hairspray	Link Larkin	US tour	Replacement
2004	Tarzan	Tarzan	NY workshop	
2005	The Light in the Piazza	Fabrizio Naccarelli	Broadway	Originated role
2005	Catch Me If You Can	Frank Abagnale, Jr.	NY reading	
2005	A Naked Girl on the Appian Way	Thad Lapin	Broadway	Originated role
2007	10 Million Miles	Duane	Off-Broadway	
2007	Chess	The Arbiter	Los Angeles	Benefit Concert
2008–2009	South Pacific	Lt. Joseph Cable, USMC	Broadway	
2010	The Rocky Horror Show	Brad Majors	Los Angeles	35th Anniversary
2015–2016	Finding Neverland	J.M. Barrie	Broadway	Originated role
2017	Damn Yankees	Joe Hardy	Broadway	Benefit Concert
2024	Chicago	Billy Flynn	Japan tour	
2026	Just in Time	Bobby Darrin	Broadway	Replacement

== Filmography ==
=== Film ===
Year	Title	Role	Notes
1999	Bob Rizzo's Simply Funk with Suzanne	Himself	
2001	Bollywood Calling	Mr. Abraham / Pat's agent	
2003	Marci X	Boyz R Us	
2006	Blinders	Scott	
2007	Music and Lyrics	Ray	
2007	Dan in Real Life	Policeman	
2007	I Think I Love My Wife	Salesman #2	
2012	What to Expect When You're Expecting	Evan Webber	
2014	Space Station 76	Daniel	
2015	Playing It Cool	Himself	
2015	Underdogs	Jake (voice)	
2016	After the Reality	Scottie	
2017	Tulip Fever	Mattheus	
2019	Crazy Alien	Zach Andrews	
2024	From Embers	Marty Baker	
2026	Test	Pastor Gregg	

=== Television ===
Year	Title	Role	Notes
1997	Relativity	Dr. Alexander	Episode: "Hearts and Bones"
1999	Sex and the City	Young busboy	Episode: "They Shoot Single People, Don't They?"
2003	Hack	Sam Wagner	Episode: "Blind Faith"
2005	Once Upon a Mattress	Sir Harry	Television Film
2006	Law & Order: Criminal Intent	Chance Slaughter	Episode: "Proud Flesh"
2006	As the World Turns	Adam Munson (#4)	Regular role; 17 episodes
2007	Ghost Whisperer	Matt Sembrook	Episode: "Bad Blood"
2007	CSI: Miami	Jesse Stark	Episode: "Bloodline"
2008	Numbers	Blaine Cleary	Episode: "Power"
2009	Taking Chance	Robert Rouse	Television film
2009–2015	Glee	Will Schuester	Main role Directed season 3, episode 9: "Extraordinary Merry Christmas"
2011	The Cleveland Show	Will Schuester	Episode: "How Do You Solve a Problem Like Roberta?"; voice role
2012	8 (play)	Paul Katamai	TV movie
2012	Live with Kelly	Himself	Co-host
2013	Hollywood Game Night	Himself	Episode: "Don't Kill My Buzz-er"
2016	The Good Wife	Connor Fox	Recurring role; 6 episodes
2016	Younger	Sebastian	Episode: "The Good Shepherd"
2017–2018	Grey's Anatomy	Paul Stadler	Guest role (seasons 13–14); 4 episodes
2019–2020	The Greatest Dancer	Himself	Dance captain
2019	American Horror Story: 1984	Trevor Kirchner	Main role
2020	#KidsTogether: The Nickelodeon Town Hall	Himself	Television special
2020	Dr. Seuss' The Grinch Musical!	The Grinch	Television special
2022	So You Think You Can Dance	Himself	Judge, season 17
2023	Paris Christmas Waltz	Leo Monroe	Television movie

== Awards and nominations ==
Year	Award ceremony	Category	Project	Result
2003	Outer Critics Circle Award	Best Featured Actor in a Musical	Hairspray	Nominated
2005	Outer Critics Circle Award	Best Featured Actor in a Musical	The Light in the Piazza	Nominated
2005	Drama Desk Award	Outstanding Actor in a Musical	The Light in the Piazza	Nominated
2005	Broadway.com Audience Award	Favorite Featured Actor in a Musical	The Light in the Piazza	Nominated
2005	Tony Award	Best Featured Actor in a Musical	The Light in the Piazza	Nominated
2008	Drama Desk Award	Outstanding Actor in a Musical	10 Million Miles	Nominated
2009	Screen Actors Guild Award	Best Performance by an Ensemble in a Television Series – Comedy (Shared with "Glee" cast)	Glee	Won
2009	Satellite Awards	Best Actor in a Series, Comedy or Musical	Glee	Won
2009	Golden Globe Awards	Best Performance by an Actor in a Television Series – Comedy or Musical	Glee	Nominated
2010	Teen Choice Award	Choice Male Scene Stealer	Glee	Nominated
2010	Satellite Awards	Best Actor in a Series, Comedy or Musical	Glee	Nominated
2010	TV Land Award	Future Classic	Glee	Won
2010	Golden Globe Awards	Best Performance by an Actor in a Television Series – Comedy or Musical	Glee	Nominated
2010	Primetime Emmy Awards	Outstanding Performance by a Lead Actor in a Comedy Series	Glee	Nominated
2010	Screen Actors Guild Award	Best Performance by an Ensemble in a Television Series – Comedy (Shared with "Glee" cast)	Glee	Nominated
2015	Broadway.com Audience Award	Favorite Actor in a Musical	Finding Neverland	Won
2015	Broadway.com Audience Award	Favorite Onstage Pair (w/ Laura Michelle Kelly)	Finding Neverland	Won
2015	Drama Desk Award	Outstanding Actor in a Musical	Finding Neverland	Nominated
2015	Drama League Award	Distinguished Performance	Finding Neverland	Nominated
