= K.S. Rhoads =

American singer-songwriter

- Born: Kevin Scott Rhoads; August 7, 1976 (age 49); Tucson, Arizona, U.S.
- Years active: 2007—present

Kevin Scott Rhoads (born August 7, 1976) is an American musician, singer-songwriter, composer, music-producer, and performer.

== Early life ==
Rhoads was born in Tucson, Arizona. He moved to Denver, Colorado, soon after he was born, and many places thereafter, eventually settling in Fort Myers, Florida. At age 15, he began focusing intensely on music, learning numerous instruments including bass, piano, and guitar. He began recording his own songs on a tascam 4 track recorder. He moved to Nashville in 2001, and recorded his debut album Dead Language

== Career ==
Dead Language was released in 2007 and received excellent critical reviews. American Songwriter called it "an exhibition in style, grace and limitless possibilities..." Listen! Nashville says: "Rhoads has the perfectionism and musicianship of Roger Waters, as well as a similar political chip on his shoulder, making him a force to be reckoned with." Rhoads' songs have been featured in hundreds of television shows (including Grey's Anatomy, This Is Us, Nashville, The Good Doctor, Station 19, CW's Batwoman & Blacklist) as well as ads for Apple, Coke, Zillow, Levi's and more. His second and third albums are titled "The Wilderness" and "Experts" respectively.

Rhoads has toured and recorded with fellow Nashville musicians for a project called Ten Out of Tenn. He, along with the other artists in Ten Out Of Tenn, is the subject of a documentary entitled Any Day Now directed by Jeff Wyatt Wilson. The film was runner-up in the Nashville Film Festival. It is the story of 10 musical artists on tour together for one summer in 2008.

Rhoads has worked with many recording artists including Miranda Lambert, Kris Allen, Lisa Loeb, Ruelle, Emily West, Natalie Hemby, Kacey Musgraves, & Beth Neilsen Chapman

Rhoads' song “Because You Are Who You Are" is featured in Academy Sports+ Outdoors' Fathers Day ad in 2015 as well as Apple's Mother's Day ad in 2016.

Rhoads song "Our Corner Of The Universe" was featured in the trailer for the Netflix movie "The Little Prince" https://www.youtube.com/watch?v=9gARHWfXE40

As a composer, he has arranged orchestral music for the Nashville Symphony, The Arkansas Symphony, scored and co-wrote the Ballet Seven Deadly Sins for the Nashville Ballet, and arranged orchestra for numerous pop artists including Little Big Town, Kris Allen, Third Day & the show "Nashville."

His video series "Kids Favorite Jams By Their Dad's Favorite Bands" has garnered millions of streams and intense popularity on social media. In the series He reimagines a children's song in the style of a famous band.
