= Thank You Camellia =

Studio album by Kris Allen
- Released: May 18, 2012
- Genre: Pop rock
- Label: RCA; 19
- Producer: J. Bonilla; Chris DeStefano; Kevin Kadish; Maison & Dragen; The Messengers; Per Kristian "Boots" Ottestad; Tim Pagnotta; Curt Schneider

Kris Allen chronology
Kris Allen (2009)	Thank You Camellia (2012)	Waiting for Christmas (2012)

Singles from Thank You Camellia
- 1. "The Vision of Love" Released: March 23, 2012

Thank You Camellia is the third studio album and second major-label album by American singer-songwriter Kris Allen. It was released on May 18, 2012.

== Background ==
Allen confirmed on April 4, 2012, via a WhoSay Twitter-based fan interview that the album's title is a reference to the home that he shared with friends from his home state of Arkansas while living in Los Angeles, where he recorded the majority of the songs featured on the album.

== Promotion ==
The only single from the album was "The Vision of Love", which was released digitally on March 26, 2012. In further promotion of the album, Allen performed new material from his forthcoming album for the first time at a sold-out show at The Mint in Los Angeles on February 9, 2012. Allen performed "The Vision of Love" and other new material from his forthcoming album at the Live in the Vineyard festival on April 13 at the Uptown Theater, in Napa, California. The show also featured Jason Mraz, Mayer Hawthorne, Mat Kearney, and more. He also performed at Mix 94.1's Pet-a-Palooza in Las Vegas on April 21, 2012. On May 19, 2012, Allen performed songs from the record on 96.9 WINK FM's Spring Fling. He also covered "She Works Hard for the Money", paying respect to the late Donna Summer.

== Critical reception ==
Professional ratings
Review scores
Source	Rating
AllMusic	3.5/5 stars
Entertainment Weekly	B+
People	3/4 stars

Entertainment Weekly's Grady Smith gave the album a B+ rating. Ceding that the songs may come off "downright Amish" compared to contemporaries on the pop charts, Smith noted that "Allen delivers his lyrics with an earnest confidence (and occasional swagger) that keeps his songs from becoming treacly," concluding that the album was "a cohesive, warmhearted charmer." USA Today's Brian Mansfield also described it as "warmhearted" with "charming flourishes." People magazine gave the album 3 out of 4 stars, calling it a "smoothly and surely executed . . . winner." Yahoo Music's Lyndsey Parker observed that "[Allen's] songwriting skills have clearly grown more sophisticated," praising the range of the material from "jaunty, summer-convertible-cruising anthems" to darker tracks such as "the propulsive and sinister alt-rocker 'Monster'" and noting that "the lyrics are plain-spoken, refreshingly unflowery, and [...] cut right to the heart of the matter."

== Chart performance ==
Thank You Camellia debuted at number 26 on the US Billboard 200. By January 2013, the album had sold 35,000 units domestically.

== Track listing ==
Thank You Camellia track listing
No.	Title	Writer(s)	Producer(s)	Length
1.	"Better with You"	Kris Allen; Jason Reeves; Rune Westberg	Tim Pagnotta	3:14
2.	"The Vision of Love"	Allen; Adam Messinger; Nasri Atweh	The Messengers	3:34
3.	"My Weakness"	Allen; Isaac Hasson; John Clark Jr.; J Bonilla	Bonilla	2:43
4.	"Out Alive"	Allen; Pagnotta; Isaac Slade	Pagnotta	3:42
5.	"Monster"	Allen; Cale Mills	Curt Schneider	3:35
6.	"Blindfolded"	Allen; Lindy Robbins; Toby Gad	Bonilla	3:09
7.	"Teach Me How Love Goes"	Allen; Mills	Pagnotta	3:26
8.	"Rooftops"	Allen; Kevin Kadish; Per Kristian "Boots" Ottestad	Kadish; Ottestad	3:02
9.	"Leave You Alone"	Allen; Mills; Schneider	Schneider	4:22
10.	"Loves Me Not" (featuring Meiko)	Allen; Nolan Sipe; Ryan Petersen	Schneider	3:33
11.	"You Got a Way"	Allen; Mills	Schneider	3:30

Digital deluxe edition bonus tracks
No.	Title	Writer(s)	Producer(s)	Length
12.	"Turn the Pages"	Allen; Robbins; Jess Cates; Chris DeStefano	DeStefano	3:01
13.	"Fighters"	Allen; Tebey; Meghan Kabir	Nick Rosen; Jaco Caraco	3:03
14.	"The Vision of Love" (Maison & Dragen Radio Remix)	Allen; Atweh; Messinger	Maison & Dragen	3:47

CD fan edition bonus tracks
No.	Title	Writer(s)	Producer(s)	Length
15.	"Shut That Door" (Acoustic)	Allen; DeStefano; Cates	Schneider	2:52
16.	"The Vision of Love" (Acoustic)	Allen; Atweh; Messinger	Schneider	3:37
17.	"Better with You" (Acoustic)	Allen; Reeves; Westbert	Schneider	2:58
18.	"Out Alive" (Acoustic)	Allen; Pagnotta	Schneider	3:44
19.	"Leave You Alone" (Acoustic)	Allen; Mills	Schneider	4:38

== Personnel ==
- Kris Allen – all vocals, acoustic piano (1, 4, 7), guitars (1, 4, 7), percussion (1), acoustic guitar (2, 8, 10), bass (7)
- Brandon Belsky – programming (1)
- Adam Messinger – instrumentation (2)
- Zac Rae – keyboards (5, 9–11)
- Francois-Paul Aiche – acoustic piano (6)
- David Baron – Rhodes electric piano (8), Hammond B3 organ (8), strings (8), "Annihilator" bass (8)
- Kevin Kadish – Korg MS-20 (8), Korg Polysix (8), Oberheim OB-8 (8), VCO synthesizer (8), acoustic piano on bridge (8), sound design (8), electric guitar (8), acoustic guitar (8), bass (8), drum programming (8), backing vocals (8)
- Boots Ottestad – acoustic piano flourishes (8), tremolo guitar (8), sine wave sub bass (8), backing vocals (8)
- Chris DeStefano – programming (12), instruments (12)
- David Givhan – guitars (1, 4)
- Aaron Steinberg – guitars (3), bass (3)
- David Levita – guitars (5, 9, 11), acoustic guitar (10), electric guitar (10)
- Jonathan Berry – guitars (6, 7), bass (6)
- Bruce Watson – electric slide guitar (10), mandolin (10)
- Curt Schnedier – bass (5, 9–11)
- Carlos de la Garza – drums (1, 7)
- Ryland Steen – drums (4)
- Aaron Sterling – drums (5, 9–11)
- Kevin Weaver – drums (8), shaker (8), tambourine (8)
- Chris Woods – viola (6), violin (6)
- Meiko – featured vocals (10)

Acoustic tracks

- Kris Allen – vocals, acoustic piano, acoustic guitar
- Curt Schnedier – bass

Production and Technical

- Rob Inadomi, Myles Lewis, Keith Naftaly and Iain Pirie – A&R
- JP Clark – vocal producer (3)
- Tim Pagnotta – engineer (1, 4, 7)
- J. Bonilla – recording (3, 6)
- Curt Schnedier – recording (5, 9–11), acoustic recordings
- Kevin Kadish – engineer (8)
- Chris DeStefano – recording (12)
- Daniele Rivera – additional and assistant engineer
- Carlos de la Garza – additional engineer (1, 7)
- Ryan Gillmor – additional engineer (1, 4, 7)
- Gavin MacKillop – additional engineer (4)
- Jorge Costa – additional engineer (6)
- Jared Woodard – studio assistant (8)
- Jon Zook – mixing (1, 3–11)
- Phil Tan – mixing (2)
- Ryan Lipman – mix assistant (1, 3–11)
- Chris Gehringer – mastering at Sterling Sound (New York, NY)
- Erwin Gorostiza – creative director
- Maria Paula Marulanda – art direction, design
- Leann Mueller – photography
- Scott Free – stylist
- Su Han – grooming
- Josh Klemme – management
- Lane Nowland – management

== Charts ==
Weekly chart performance for Thank You Camellia
Chart (2012)	Peak position
Canadian Albums (Billboard)	93
US Billboard 200	26

== Release dates ==
Thank You Camellia release history
Region	Date	Label	Format(s)
Ireland	May 18, 2012	RCA Records	CD; digital download
United Kingdom	May 21, 2012	RCA Records	CD; digital download
United States	May 22, 2012	RCA; 19	CD; digital download
