= Live Like We're Dying =

2009 single by Kris Allen

Single by Kris Allen

from the album Kris Allen
- Released: September 21, 2009
- Recorded: 2009
- Genre: Pop rock
- Length: 3:32
- Label: Jive
- Songwriters: Danny O'Donoghue; Mark Sheehan; Andrew Frampton; Steve Kipner
- Producers: Andrew Frampton; Steve Kipner

Kris Allen singles chronology
| "No Boundaries" (2009) | "Live Like We're Dying" (2009) | "Let It Be" (2010) |

Alternative cover
- Earlier release/Digital download cover

"Live Like We're Dying" is a song written by Danny O'Donoghue, Andrew Frampton, Mark Sheehan and Steve Kipner. It appeared as a bonus track on the Script's self-titled debut studio album, and as a B-side for some of the album's singles. It is better known for being performed by American recording artist Kris Allen. The song served as the lead single from his self-titled major label debut album. It was released for digital download on September 21, 2009.

The song received positive reviews, peaking at eighteen in the United States, and charting on other U.S. charts, including the top ten of the Pop Songs chart. It also charted abroad in Canada and New Zealand. The song's accompanying music video, which takes place in a desert and features a countdown clock in conjunction with the song's meaning, was received warmly, and according to critics, was an end to the low-budget, storyline-centered, debut music videos from previous American Idol alumni.

== Background ==
The song had been recorded by Irish band the Script as a bonus track for the Japanese release of their self-titled debut album and as a B-side track for their debut single "We Cry" in Australia, Finland, the UK, Ireland, New Zealand, Sweden, and Switzerland.

In an interview with MTV News, Allen stated that the song had been earmarked as his album's potential single since he won American Idol back in May 2009. Allen stated, "[The song] was actually one that we had listened to really early on, and we kind of just fell in love with it. Everyone did." When an interview for his cover story shared with, Idol runner-up, Adam Lambert, Allen explained, "It's a song that has a really good message-that we only have so much time, let's make the most of it. It's definitely got one of the choruses where I can picture people rolling down the windows of their cars and singing along to it."

After the success of the single, in an interview with Entertainment Weekly, Allen said,

"It took a while, but it’s done really incredible. It exceeded all my expectations anyway. To be honest, I was a little worried when it first came out and it wasn’t doing great. But I think it’s just about working hard and getting people to hear the song, and then everyone started believing in it a little bit more. I remember getting a text from Keith Urban saying 'I’m not gonna lie: The first time I heard that song I wasn’t crazy about it. But after a couple listens, I really, really like it.' And I mean, I think that’s how everybody felt about the song. And I think that’s a testament to a good song. You don’t have to love ‘em the first time you hear ‘em. It grew on people."

== Composition ==
"Live Like We're Dying"
A 25-second sample of "Live Like We're Dying"

"Live Like We're Dying" is described to be in a "moderate pop rock" groove, and consisting of "shuffly" guitar playing. The song has been referred to as "danceable", and the chorus as "grooving" and "syncopated". It is written in the key of C major and Allen's vocals span from G_{3} to A_{4}. The song contains inspirational lyrics, as Allen gives a "muscular" and "engaged" vocal performance, and delivers the lines in a rhythmic fashion. According to Michael Slezak of Entertainment Weekly, the song contains new-age sentiments.

== Critical reception ==
Bill Lamb of About.com praised the song for being an excellent first single, calling it "possibly the best first post-American Idol single yet by an American Idol champion" and stating that it "could appeal to a massive audience". He also applauded the song's "outstanding, inspirational lyrics" and Allen's vocal performance. Entertainment Weekly''s Michael Slezak called the song "a future smash hit" and described it as "downright verbose – packing in some sweet, new-age-y sentiments about existing in the moment, living without regret, and saying 'I love you' early and often to the people in our lives". He stated that rather than being cliché the song's lyrics are "winningly inspirational thanks to the conviction in Kris’ vocals". Yahoo! News described it as "impressive" and felt that Allen's version of the song "improves on the unreleased version with a nuanced vocal and a nimble, rhythmic delivery". Monica Herrera of Billboard said that Allen "improves" the Script's version "with a nuanced vocal and a nimble, rhythmic delivery". Herrera also stated that "Allen still seems "emboldened by the risks he took on Idol" and that his fans "should be feeling the same after hearing the first track from his November 17 debut."

James Montgomery of MTV News said that the song seemed "tailor-made" for him, playing on the strengths that led him to win American Idol. Montgomery also said, "his husky, broad voice, shuffly guitar playing and genuinely sweet disposition – and wraps them in a well-worn, subtly sexy tune, full of wide-eyed, dare we say inspirational sentiments. Yet, at the same time, it's also incredibly earnest in tone." Misha Berson of the Seattle Times described the song as "surprising, and maybe a little jarring at first, if you expected a ballad or a mellow groove with a spare arrangement, like some of Allen's best performances on American Idol that paved the way to his Season 8 win". In spite of Berson's initial surprise at the song's sound, she went on to praise the single as "very catchy, a bit inspirational", and "energetic". She praised the chorus and further commended the song as "a marked improvement over what some Idol winners have put out as their first post-show single".

== Chart performance ==
The song debuted after its first week of availability at number 89 on the Billboard Hot 100, selling 24,000 copies. It fell off the chart the following week, and remained off until it re-entered at number 92 on November 21, 2009. It peaked at number 18 on the chart on the week of March 13, 2010. The song peaked at number 10 on the Mainstream Top 40 (Pop Songs) chart, becoming the first male American Idol winner to enter the chart's top 10, and the fourth winner to achieve the feat following behind Kelly Clarkson, Carrie Underwood and Jordin Sparks, respectively. The song also peaked on the Adult Contemporary, Adult Pop Songs, and Christian Songs charts at nine, three and 21. As of December 2010, "Live Like We're Dying" has sold 1,582,000 digital downloads in the United States. The song was certified platinum by the RIAA on October 15, 2010.

Internationally, "Live Like We're Dying" had limited chart presence. It peaked at number 18 in New Zealand and number 41 in Canada.

== Music video ==
Allen playing a grand piano in front of a giant countdown clock in the desert scene.

The music video was directed by Marco Puig and filmed in a desert near Los Angeles, California. The video premiered on AOL's PopEater on November 6, 2009. Allen told Billboard magazine, "The video looks great. It was really fun shooting it-we shot it from 8 p.m. until 8 a.m. so it was an all-night thing with no breaks. [The shoot was] set up like a digital clock, but it's huge, it's this monstrous thing-like 25 feet tall and who knows how long. I get to hold a flare, which was pretty cool. I ended up throwing it at people on set."

The video begins with Allen pulling up to a junkyard in a white pickup truck at night, with a watch hanging from his key chain. Then, Allen takes a power cord out of the back of the truck and carries it through the junkyard until he plugs it in and flips a switch to turn on a large countdown clock. As the clock reaches zero, Allen leaves and begins walking away from the camera as the sun rises. Throughout the video, Allen is shown playing both an acoustic guitar and a piano, as well as singing with a microphone.

Michael Slezak of Entertainment Weekly said that the video was "a luxe-looking, moodily lit affair that finds the season 8 champ clad in a physique-appropriate black henley and stalking his way through an abandoned construction site featuring a giant countdown clock, a dramatic sunrise, and copious amounts of recycled plastic sheeting." Slezak also said that, "the folks at 19 gave Kris the proper budget to kick off his video career – at least we finally know what the company did with the savings gleaned from hiring student filmmakers to helm Blake Lewis and Diana DeGarmo’s tragic first clips". James Montgomery of MTV News noted that the video looked better and more expensive that past-first videos by American Idol alumni under 19. Montgomery also compared the video's "artfully color-saturated frames and great expanses" to Snow Patrol's "Run" clip and the Madonna, Justin Timberlake, and Timbaland's "4 Minutes", doing away with the "narrative crutch most Idol champs' debuts lean on (see, for example, David Cook's 'Light On'), putting the focus squarely on Allen himself." He also said that, "while Allen's debut video isn't as flashy-dashy as Idol compatriot Adam Lambert's 'Time for Miracles,' it's just as good – mostly because, rather than rely on fiery explosions, 'Dying' plays it straight, showcasing Allen and his talents", and called it "bold" as Allen was never shown as the "flashy type".

== Live performances ==
Allen performed the song on Good Morning America on November 17, 2009. In addition he also performed the song on Live with Regis and Kelly, and The Tonight Show with Conan O'Brien to promote his album. Allen performed the song on the So You Think You Can Dance live results show December 9, 2009. Allen also performed the song on the Late Show with David Letterman on December 16, 2009. Allen again performed the song at the Billboard New Year's Eve show, which aired on Fox on December 31, 2009.

== Credits and personnel ==
- Songwriting – Steve Kipner, Andrew Frampton, Danny O'Donoghue, Mark Sheehan
- Production – Steve Kipner, Andrew Frampton
- Background vocals – Billy Sollox
- Drums – Glen Power
- Bass – Danny O'Donoghue
- Electric guitar – Paul Inder, Mark Sheehan
- Acoustic guitar – Andrew Frampton
- Keyboards – Andrew Frampton, Steve Kipner
- Mixing – Spike Stent
- Engineering – Dan Frampton, Ted Paduck

== Charts ==
=== Weekly charts ===
| Chart (2009–10) | Peak position |
|---|---|
| Canada Hot 100 (Billboard) | 41 |
| Canada AC (Billboard) | 49 |
| Canada CHR/Top 40 (Billboard) | 32 |
| Canada Hot AC (Billboard) | 13 |
| New Zealand (Recorded Music NZ) | 18 |
| US Billboard Hot 100 | 18 |
| US Adult Contemporary (Billboard) | 8 |
| US Adult Pop Airplay (Billboard) | 3 |
| US Hot Christian Songs (Billboard) | 21 |
| US Pop Airplay (Billboard) | 10 |

=== Year-end charts ===
| Chart (2010) | Position |
|---|---|
| US Billboard Hot 100 | 48 |
| US Adult Contemporary (Billboard) | 13 |
| US Adult Pop Songs (Billboard) | 9 |
| US Pop Songs (Billboard) | 49 |

== Awards and nominations ==
BMI Pop Music Award

| Year | Nominee / work | Award | Result |
|---|---|---|---|
| 2011 | "Live Like We're Dying" | Award-Winning Songs | Won |

Billboard Music Awards

| Year | Nominee / work | Award | Result |
|---|---|---|---|
| 2011 | "Live Like We're Dying" | Top Christian Song | Nominated |

== Certifications ==
| Region | Certification | Certified units/sales |
|---|---|---|
| United States (RIAA) | Platinum | 1,000,000^{^} |
^{^} Shipments figures based on certification alone.

== Release history ==
| Region | Date | Format |
|---|---|---|
| United States | September 25, 2009 | Digital download |
| United States | October 12, 2009 | Top 40/Mainstream; Hot AC |
