= Kris Allen =

American singer-songwriter from Arkansas

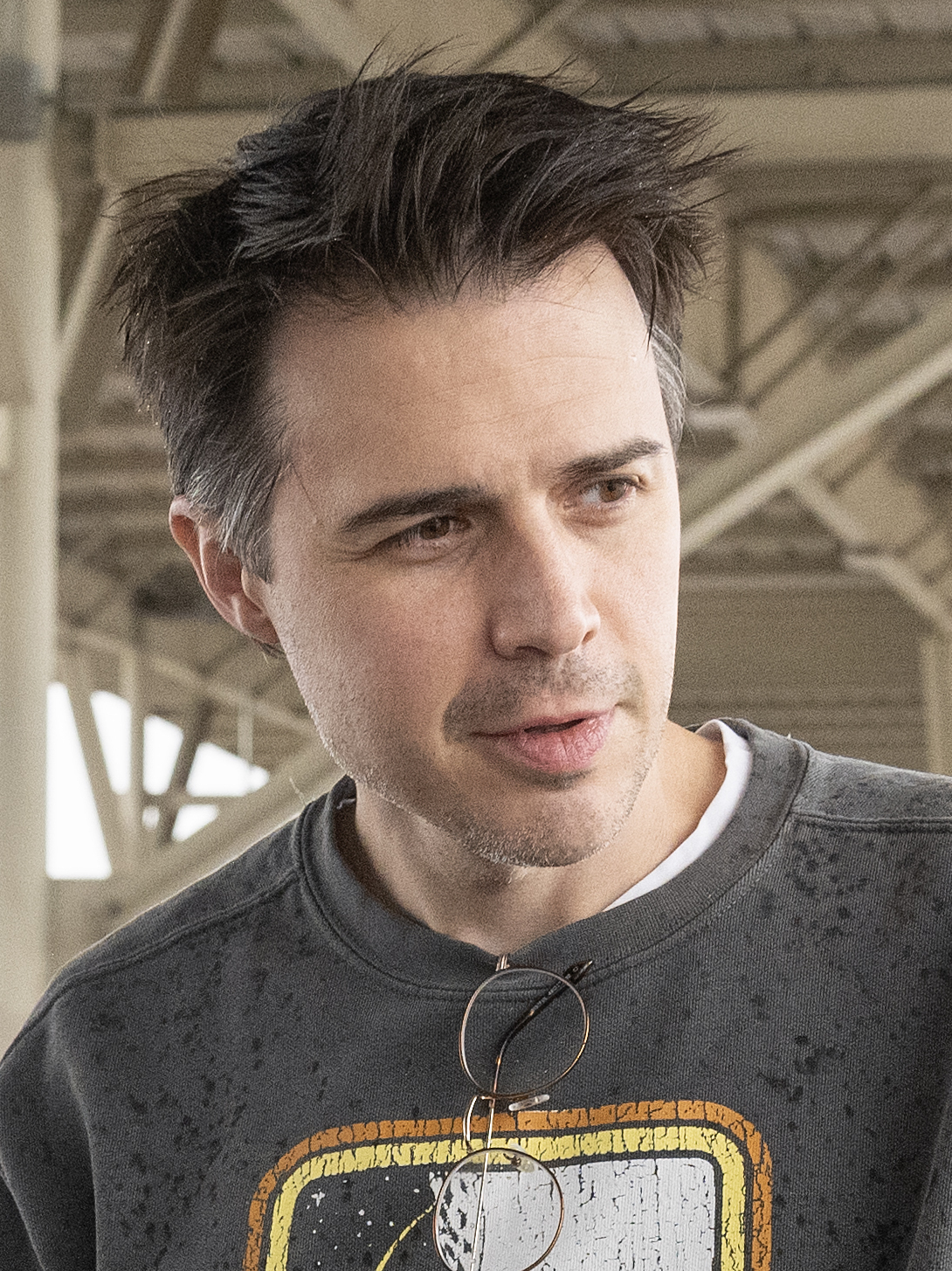
- Allen in 2023

Background information
- Born: Kristopher Neil Allen; June 21, 1985 (age 41); Jacksonville, Arkansas, U.S.
- Origin: Conway, Arkansas, U.S.
- Genres: Pop rock; alternative rock; acoustic rock; blue-eyed soul
- Occupations: Singer; songwriter
- Instruments: Vocals; guitar
- Years active: 2007–present
- Labels: Jive; RCA; 19; DogBear
- Spouse: Katy O'Connell (m. 2008)
- Website: krisallenofficial.com

Kristopher Neil Allen (born June 21, 1985) is an American singer, songwriter, and the winner of the eighth season of American Idol.

Prior to Idol, he self-released a 2007 album, Brand New Shoes.

Allen's Idol coronation song, "No Boundaries" and his version of "Heartless" both charted within the Top 20 of the Billboard Hot 100. Allen's post-Idol self-titled album was released on November 17, 2009, by Jive Records. The album debuted at number 11 on the U.S. Billboard 200. The album's lead single, "Live Like We're Dying", was released on September 21, 2009, and peaked at number 18 in the U.S. with combined sales of over 1.7 million. Allen's second major-label album Thank You Camellia was released on May 22, 2012, and the lead single "The Vision of Love" was released March 26, 2012.

Allen released his fifth studio album, Letting You In, on March 18, 2016.

== Early life ==
Allen was born in Jacksonville, Arkansas, to Kimberly (née Wood) and Neil Allen. He is the elder of two sons; his younger brother, Daniel, is a college cheerleading coach.

Allen's interest in music began very early. He began playing the viola in elementary school and went on to play the instrument in the Mills University Studies High School orchestra, eventually winning a spot in the Arkansas all-state orchestra. Additionally, he taught himself to play the guitar at age 13, and also plays the piano. His musical influences, as stated in his Idol confessionals, include the Beatles, Jamie Cullum, Jason Mraz, Pat Monahan, John Mayer and Michael Jackson. Allen played publicly for several years before trying out for Idol, even opening for earlier Idol contestant Sean Michel on multiple occasions. He has described his decision to audition for American Idol as a "last hurrah" before giving up his pursuit of a music career.

After high school, Allen moved to Conway, Arkansas, to attend the University of Central Arkansas, where he was a business major and a member of Chi Alpha campus ministries. During college, he participated in Christian missionary work around the world, including in Morocco, Mozambique, Myanmar, South Africa, Spain and Thailand. Allen also served as a worship leader for New Life Church in Conway and Little Rock, AR, as well as for the Chi Alpha campus ministry. He dropped out of college in the middle of his junior year to pursue music professionally, performing in local bars and working as a shoe salesman to make ends meet. Allen planned to go back to college to finish his degree and "get a real job", but instead was persuaded to audition for American Idol along with his brother Daniel and his friends Cale Mills, Robbie Busick and Andee Walker. Kris stated that "If I had not made it through in American Idol, I would have gone back to college and gotten my business degree."

== Career ==
=== Pre-Idol and Brand New Shoes ===
Allen realized during college that he wanted to play music professionally and began trying to write music. He played his first gig at a local venue in downtown Conway during his sophomore year, and he went on to drop out of college in the middle of his junior year to follow his dream of becoming a professional musician. He worked as a shoe salesman at a sporting goods store during the day to make ends meet and continued playing gigs in Little Rock and Fayetteville at night. In 2007, Allen wrote and self-produced an album entitled Brand New Shoes with college friends and bandmates Michael Holmes (drums) and Chase Erwin (bass). The album's title makes reference to Allen's days as a shoe salesman, and only 600 copies of the album were produced, most of which were given to family and friends.

=== American Idol ===
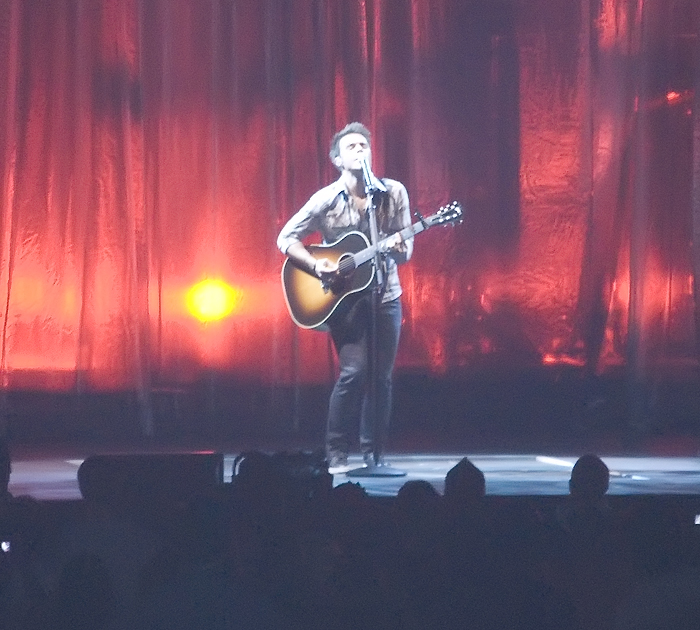
Kris Allen on the American Idol Tour, August 5, 2009

Allen auditioned for the eighth season of American Idol in Louisville, Kentucky, with his brother Daniel, who did not make it to Hollywood. In the early stages of the season, he was among the finalists (along with Allison Iraheta) that received the least amount of screen time. Only several seconds of his first audition (and neither of his Hollywood Week solo performances) were shown, although his group performance with White Chocolate (including fellow finalist Matt Giraud) was aired in its entirety. The judges also asked him to participate in an un-aired sing-off with another contestant, Kenny Hoffpauer, before they allowed him to enter the semifinals round.

Throughout the competition, Allen received many compliments for his folk-inspired interpretations of modern pop songs. He played several instruments during his performances, including the acoustic guitar, the electric guitar, the keyboard, and the piano. His performance of "To Make You Feel My Love" as part of the Top 11 earned praise from the judges, with Simon Cowell commenting, "I am genuinely beginning to think you have a shot of doing well in this competition." In the finals, he performed his own arrangement of "Ain't No Sunshine" on a keyboard, with a few musicians on stage, which earned praise from the judges. Cowell lauded it as Allen's "best performance so far."

On the first Top 7 night, Allen chose to sing the Oscar-winning song "Falling Slowly" from the indie film Once. While Randy Jackson described it as "pitchy from note one", Kara DioGuardi declared it "one of your best moments ever." Due to time constraints, Paula Abdul and Cowell did not comment, but on the following night's results show, Cowell stated "Kris, you were brilliant." Allen subsequently received a signed record and other gifts from the original artists, Glen Hansard and Markéta Irglová. On the second Top 7 show, Allen brought back the guitar for the fourth time and performed an original, acoustic version of "She Works Hard for the Money", complete with bongo drums and the band on stage. This earned praise from all four judges, with Abdul remarking "There aren't many men who are willing to shop in the women's department. You shopped and found a perfect fit." For his second Top 3 performance, Allen impressed the judges with an acoustic arrangement of Kanye West's "Heartless", prompting Jackson to state that he preferred it to West's original and The Fray's cover version. Cowell agreed and said, "I had written you out of the competition but that has changed after that performance." This performance helped Kris move on to the finals and win.

After being voted into the Top 3, Allen returned to Arkansas, filming the hometown material needed for the next two American Idol episodes. Allen's homecoming parade was greeted by a crowd estimated to be greater than 20,000. Allen performed at three concerts in Little Rock and Conway, Arkansas, playing many of his popular songs during the competition, including "Man in the Mirror", "Ain't No Sunshine", "Falling Slowly" and "She Works Hard for the Money" at the venues, as well as "Come Together" at the studio of local Fox affiliate KLRT-TV. He accompanied himself on all of these songs with his guitar.

During the final performance show, Allen performed a reprise of "Ain't No Sunshine", Simon Fuller's choice of "What's Going On" and the coronation song, "No Boundaries". During the final results show, he performed a duet with Keith Urban, singing Urban's single "Kiss a Girl", as well as a series of medleys with his fellow Season 8 contestants. Before the results were announced, Allen performed "We Are the Champions" with eventual runner-up Adam Lambert and Brian May and Roger Taylor of Queen.

On May 20, 2009, Kris Allen was declared the winner of the eighth season of American Idol, becoming the first married contestant to claim the title, as well as the sixth winner from the show's inception from the Southern United States. Allen also became the first winner to accept a trophy shaped like a microphone. Nearly 100 million votes were cast during the finale, setting a new world record for a televised singing competition. Unlike the previous season, the winning margin was undisclosed. Numerous sources, including the Associated Press, claimed that the margin "wasn't even close". Allen has admitted that the alleged disparity in votes was a "total surprise" to him.

Certain commentators labeled the win as an "upset" since runner-up Adam Lambert had received a significant amount of media attention throughout the season and was widely perceived to be the show's front-runner. Allen's victory was seen as highly controversial as viewers and the media speculated about the details of the result. However, during the Top 3 results show, host Ryan Seacrest had revealed that the margin between Allen and Lambert was fewer than a million votes. Fox and AT&T have stated that they "stand by the outcome" and are "absolutely certain" that "Kris Allen is the American Idol".

==== Performances and results ====
Week	Theme	Song choice	Original artist	Order #	Result
Audition	Auditioner's Choice	"A Song for You"	Leon Russell	N/A	Advanced
Hollywood Rounds, Part 1	First Solo	"For Once in My Life"	Stevie Wonder	N/A	Advanced
Hollywood Rounds, Part 2	Group Performance	"I Want You Back"	The Jackson 5	1	Advanced
Hollywood Rounds, Part 3	Second Solo	"Everything"	Michael Bublé	N/A	Advanced
Top 36/ Semi-Final 2	Billboard Hot 100 Hits to Date	"Man in the Mirror"	Michael Jackson	6	Advanced
Top 13	Michael Jackson	"Remember the Time"	Michael Jackson	6	Safe
Top 11	Grand Ole Opry	"Make You Feel My Love"	Bob Dylan	3	Safe
Top 10	Motown	"How Sweet It Is (To Be Loved by You)"	Marvin Gaye	2	Safe
Top 9	Top Downloads	"Ain't No Sunshine"	Bill Withers	9	Safe
Top 8	Year They Were Born	"All She Wants to Do Is Dance"	Don Henley	2	Safe
Top 7	Songs from the Cinema	"Falling Slowly"	Glen Hansard & Markéta Irglová	6	Safe
Top 7^{1}	Disco	"She Works Hard for the Money"	Donna Summer	2	Safe
Top 5	Rat Pack Standards	"The Way You Look Tonight"	Fred Astaire	1	Bottom 3^{2}
Top 4	Rock and Roll	Duet "Renegade" with Danny Gokey	Styx	3	Safe
Top 4	Rock and Roll	Solo "Come Together"	The Beatles	4	Safe
Top 3	Judges' Choice	"Apologize"	OneRepublic	2	Safe
Top 3	Contestant's Choice	"Heartless"	Kanye West	5	Safe
Top 2	Contestant's Choice	"Ain't No Sunshine"	Bill Withers	2	Winner
Top 2	Simon Fuller's Choice	"What's Going On"	Marvin Gaye	4	Winner
Top 2	Coronation Song	"No Boundaries"	Kris Allen	6	Winner

- ^1 Due to the judges using their one save to save Matt Giraud, the Top 7 remained intact for another week.
- ^2 When Ryan Seacrest announced the results for this particular night, Allen was among the Bottom 3, but declared safe first.

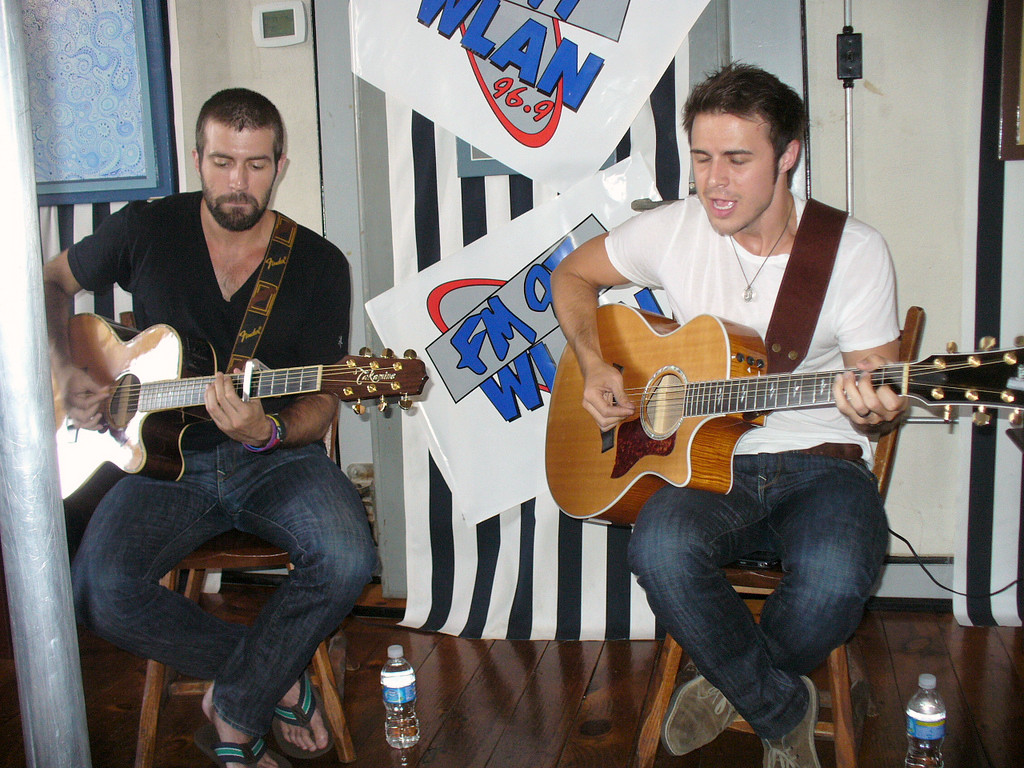
Allen with Cale Mills in 2009

After winning Idol, Allen made his Billboard Hot 100 debut with five songs charting within the top 100. His coronation single "No Boundaries" debuted at number 11, followed by "Heartless" at number 16, "Ain't No Sunshine" at number 37, "Apologize" at number 66, and "Falling Slowly" at number 94. "No Boundaries" also topped the iTunes singles chart following the Idol season finale. On June 7, 2009, Allen performed the National Anthem at Game 2 of the 2009 NBA Finals to a packed house including Adam Levine, Jack Nicholson, Rihanna, Paula Abdul and Leonardo DiCaprio. Following the performance, which was described as "executed to perfection", the announcement was made that Allen had signed a record deal with Jive Records (along with fellow finalist Allison Iraheta). His major label debut was quickly scheduled for a Fall 2009 release.

=== Kris Allen (2009–2011) ===
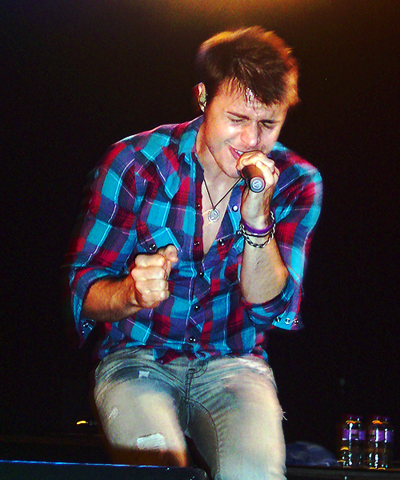
Allen in 2010

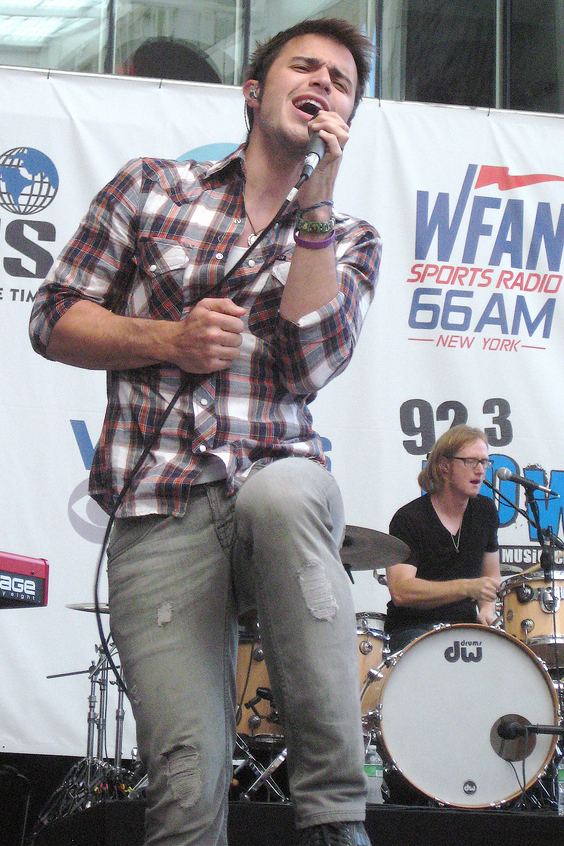
Allen in 2010

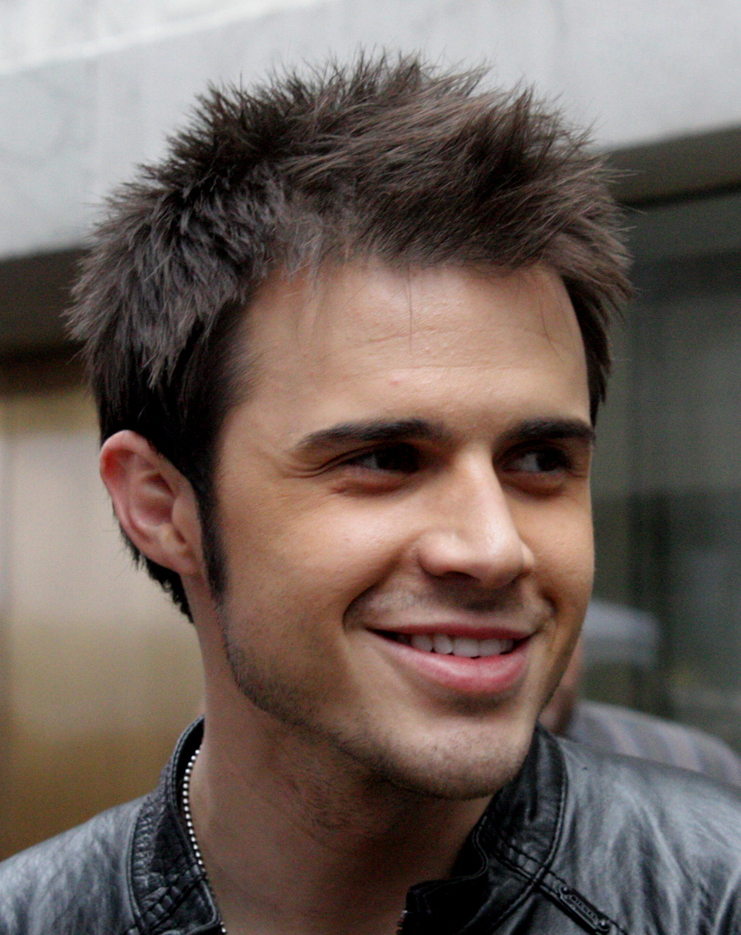
Allen in New York City in 2009

On his self-titled debut album, Allen collaborated with Claude Kelly, David Hodges, Jon Foreman of Switchfoot, Salaam Remi and Joe King of The Fray. He also worked with Toby Gad, Alex Band of The Calling, Dan Wilson of Semisonic, Chris Daughtry and Mat Kearney for the album. Allen's debut single, "Live Like We're Dying" was released via Z100 in New York on September 21, 2009. On November 6, 2009, his music video for "Live Like We're Dying" premiered on AOL's PopEater.com. "Live Like We're Dying" would go on to peak at number 18 on the Billboard Hot 100 and achieve platinum status with over 1.7 million in combined sales.

Kris Allen was released on November 17, 2009. Allen wrote or co-wrote 9 of 12 tracks on the album. In a break with Idol tradition, Allen chose not to include his coronation single "No Boundaries" on his debut album, choosing instead to record a new version of his cover of "Heartless" as a bonus track. After its first week of sales, the album debuted at 11 on the Billboard 200 after selling just over 80,000 copies. Allen's first-week album sales were the weakest that had yet been seen by an Idol champion's post-show debut, although observers attributed this partly to weak album sales throughout the industry at the time. As of December 2011, Kris Allen has sold approximately 329,000 copies.

On February 19, 2010, Allen traveled to Haiti with the United Nations Foundation in order to raise awareness for the disaster relief efforts there as the UN and other groups continue to rebuild after the earthquake. Allen made his return to the Idol stage during the February 25 American Idol results show to share footage of his experiences in Haiti and to perform "Let It Be". This performance was made available for download as a charity single on iTunes after the show.

The second single released from the album was "The Truth" featuring Pat Monahan, the lead singer of the Grammy award-winning rock band Train, who co-wrote the song. Allen performed the song live at the American Idol Season 9 finale on May 26, 2010. That same night, Allen joined the other Idol winners to sing "Together We Are One" to honor Simon Cowell. Allen hit the road for his first solo tour during June and July 2010 with Green River Ordinance and Justin Gaston as opening acts. He then went on to join a few major tours over the rest of the summer, opening for Barenaked Ladies, Maroon 5, and Keith Urban between July and September 2010. He then opened for Lifehouse during October and November 2010. Allen revealed that the third single off his album would be "Alright with Me" on October 6, 2010. On November 18, 2010, he posted an unofficial music video for the song on his official website to thank his fans for their support.

"Before We Come Undone", a song that Allen had co-written for his debut album, was covered by season six South African Idol runner-up Lloyd Cele for his debut album One released April 24, 2011. Allen co-wrote a song, "Still Got Tonight", with Andrew Frampton and Steve Kipner that appeared as the second single on Glee's Matthew Morrison's self-titled debut album released May 10, 2011. "Still Got Tonight" was also featured in the season 2 finale of Glee sung by Matthew Morrison himself. On May 29, 2011, Kris sang "God Bless the USA" at the National Memorial Day Concert in Washington, D.C., aired live by PBS.

Allen co-wrote a song, "Blindfolded" with Lindy Robbins and Toby Gad that appeared on the first season South African Idol winner, Heinz Winckler's album 24/7/365. released July 8, 2011. The song was released as Winckler's English debut single & performed at the finale of the 2011 edition of South African Idol. The song was later recorded by Allen himself, who included it on his second album. Allen co-wrote a song, "Raise Your Hand", with Andrew Frampton and Kevin Hughes that appears on The Voice first season winner Javier Colon's debut album Come Through For You released November 21, 2011. Javier sang the song as part of the Walmart Soundcheck performance series.

On December 3, 2011, Allen along with Grammy-winning singer/songwriter and producer, David Hodges and Andy Davis, founder of Music Empowers Foundation were celebrity judges for The Alchemy Songwriting Competition in Conway, AR. The proceeds of the contest to benefit Blackbird Academy, an arts and music school in Conway, Arkansas. The following day, Allen performed John Lennon's "Imagine" at Trevor Live, a star-studded benefit for The Trevor Project.

=== Thank You Camellia and Horizons (2011–14) ===
On October 7, 2011, RCA Music Group announced it was disbanding Jive Records along with Arista Records and J Records. Following the shutdown, Allen (and all other artists previously signed to these three labels) has released his recordings on the 19 Recordings and RCA Records labels. Allen debuted several new songs at an acoustic concert at The Mint in Los Angeles on February 9, 2012. The new tracks he performed were called "Monster", "Out Alive", "Better with You", "The Vision of Love" and "Teach Me How Love Goes". He also performed "Leave You Alone", "You Got a Way", and "Keep that Devil Out", which he had debuted at earlier concerts.

"The Vision of Love" was officially announced as the lead single from Allen's second album on March 6, 2012. The song was co-written by Allen, Nasri, and Adam Messinger, and it is available for download on iTunes and an exclusive version consisting the remix from the Finnish duo Maison and Dragen on Walmart since March 26, 2012. The remix of the track leaked onto the internet on January 25, 2012.

It was announced March 29, 2012, that Allen's second album titled, Thank You Camellia, would be released on May 22, 2012. Allen auditioned for the lead role in the 2012 musical film Rock of Ages, but lost the role to Diego Boneta. Although Allen was considered to be a better singer than anyone else who had tried out for the role up to that point, he had never auditioned for a film before and has said that he did not feel confident in his acting abilities. In an interview with OK Magazine, Allen said he does not feel that he would have been a good fit for role and currently does not have any further plans to pursue acting. On September 4, 2012, Allen revealed that he parted ways with 19 Management when his contract expired in May 2012 and has signed with new management, Pearl Group Entertainment. In the same month he left RCA.

On November 7, 2012, the cover of an EP entitled Waiting for Christmas was revealed via Twitter. The five song EP includes "Holly Jolly Christmas", "White Christmas", "O Holy Night", "Have Yourself A Merry Little Christmas", "The Christmas Song". The EP was released on December 10, 2012. On December 20, 2012, during an online concert, Allen debuted a new song called "Where Are You Amy?" that he dedicated to those affected by the Sandy Hook Elementary School shooting.

From January 8 to May 3, 2013, Allen toured the United States on his second solo tour Out Alive. The tour consisted of 40 dates with bandmates, Cale Mills and Chris Torres, and newcomer Andrew St. Marie on the piano. The opening act for most of the dates was Jillette Johnson. The tour ended in a sold-out Rams Head in Hanover, Maryland.

On January 8, 2014, Allen entered the recording studio with producer Charlie Peacock to begin recording his third post-Idol album at Peacock's studio in Nashville. "Prove It to You", featuring Lenachka, was announced as the lead single on July 1, 2014, debuted at Yahoo Music on July 7, 2014 and released on iTunes on July 8, 2014. He performed multiple tracks from the album live acoustically on Yahoo. On August 12, 2014, Allen released Horizons. It debuted at #80 on the Billboard 200, and #10 on the Independent Album chart. Allen did a tour of the U.S. and Canada with the group Boyce Avenue in the fall of 2014. Meanwhile, one of his songs off Horizons, "Lost" was used on the CW shows Arrow (in episode titled "The Secret Origin of Felicity Smoak") and The Vampire Diaries (episode titled "Alone"). Allen has continued to tour in early 2015, including performing at U.S. military bases in Italy and Portugal.

=== Letting You In (2016–present) ===
In 2015, he began work on his next studio album. The lead single, "Waves", was released to digital retailers on February 19, 2016, alongside pre-orders of the album. His fifth studio album, Letting You In, was released on March 18, 2016. "Love Will Find You" was released to American hot adult contemporary radio on September 19, 2016, as the second single.

In April, he released an EP called Acoustic Tapes which featured songs from throughout his previous albums. Somethin' About Christmas, was released on November 4, 2016. It was supported by the single "Mommy, Is There More Than Just One Santa Claus?" for which he asked fans for photo submissions for the music video. He also recorded a track with Jim Brickman for his album Comfort & Joy called "A Little Bit of Christmas" and joined him for a holiday tour.

In February 2017, he released an acoustic version of his single "Waves" for Valentine's Day. Also that month, he announced he had formed a new band called The Dames. They premiered a song called "The Death of Mr. Jones" in addition to doing a StageIt show. On April 7, 2017, he released a surprise Letting You In acoustic EP which featured a brand new song called "Venice". On May 20, 2017, The Dames released their first song digitally, "The Death of Mr. Jones". The song was the first of six songs to be released that year by the band.

On May 6, 2018, Allen announced on Twitter that he would be joining the American Idol Live! Tour as a special guest. The tour kicked off in Redding, California, on July 11. Allen also released a new single, "When All The Stars Have Died," on June 29, 2018. On September 20, 2019, Allen released 10, which consisted of reworked versions of songs from his previous albums. The album title referenced that it had been ten years since Allen won American Idol and began his music career.

In 2021, Allen toured Europe with David Cook. The tour dates were rescheduled twice due to COVID-19 pandemic. The tour consisted of nine shows across Northern Europe and the United Kingdom. Prior to the shows Allen released four new songs. One of the songs was dedicated to his eldest son and had an animated music video. In 2022 he released a song called "It's You I Like", and on his Patreon-page he asked people to send him their childhood photo to make a personalized cover for the song.

== Philanthropy ==
Prior to appearing on American Idol, Allen participated in missionary work in several countries around the world, including Burma, Thailand, Mozambique, Morocco, and South Africa with the University of Central Arkansas' Chi Alpha campus ministry. In Morocco, during his first mission trip, Allen contracted a rare form of hepatitis that left him sick for an entire year after returning home. Allen credits this near-death experience with giving him the ability to write songs as he was finally able to compose his first original song while recuperating from his illness. A couple of years later, while on a mission trip in Thailand, Allen became moved when he saw a worship leader struggling with poor music and sound equipment during a church service at a refugee camp. He chose to leave behind a brand new guitar for the church to use even though that was the only guitar he owned at the time. His experiences in Thailand inspired the song "Land of Smiles" from his pre-Idol album Brand New Shoes.

Allen is a strong proponent of music education, and since winning Idol, he has become heavily involved with several charitable organizations that promote music education, including the Music Empowers Foundation and Little Kids Rock. He has stated, "To me, music education is vital to every kid's development, and it can change their lives. I know that if I hadn't had access to music programs in school that I wouldn't be where I am today." For his support of music education in schools, Allen was honored by Little Kids Rock in October 2010. In November 2011, Allen announced that he would be growing a mustache for four weeks to give his fans an incentive to support DonorsChoose and Music Empowers in their efforts to promote music education in public schools. This campaign played a major role in the raising of $80,000 by Music Empowers for music education programs as more than 50% of the donations came from Allen's fans.

Allen has also been a supporter of TOMS Shoes and participated in the company's first shoe drop in Rwanda in March 2010. Following his trip to Rwanda, Allen joined the Barefoot Walk at his alma mater the University of Central Arkansas and performed barefoot to support TOMS shoes and Bridge2Rwanda, an organization that collaborated with TOMS for the Rwanda shoe drop.

In February 2010, Allen traveled to Haiti with the United Nations Foundation to help with relief efforts following the Haiti earthquake. When he returned, he kicked off that year's Idol Gives Back campaign by discussing his trip to Haiti and performing The Beatles' "Let It Be" on the American Idol Season 9 Top 24 results show on February 25, 2010. Allen's rendition of "Let It Be" was made available for download on iTunes with all proceeds going toward the UN Foundation's relief efforts in Haiti. Sales from this performance raised over $250,000 for the UN Foundation.

Allen's humanitarian work has inspired his fans to organize charitable efforts in his honor. To celebrate Allen's 25th birthday, his fans donated over $25,000 to Heifer International, enough to pay for 50 cows to feed families in need. Inspired by Allen's support of music education, his fans also organized a donation of over $28,000 to Music Empowers in December 2010. In honor of Allen's 26th birthday, his fans banded together once again to donate more than $26,000 to Direct Relief toward disaster relief.

In November 2012, Allen visited World Vision's project in Kenya. The visit was part of the True Spirit of Christmas tour, where Allen also made a short video clip singing "Silent Night."

== Personal life ==
Allen married his high school sweetheart Katy O'Connell on September 26, 2008. The two began dating in Allen's junior year of high school. Their son was born in 2013. Their second child, a daughter, was born in 2016. Their third child, another son, was born in 2019.

== Backing band ==
Current members

- Cale Mills – guitar, keyboards, backing vocals (2009–present)
- Chris Torres – bass guitar, percussion, backing vocals (2009–present)
- Andrew St. Marie – keyboards, saxophone, percussion, backing vocals (2013–present)
- Devon Curry – drums, backing vocals (2016–present)

Former members

- Andrew DeRoberts – lead guitar, backing vocals (2009–2012)
- Ryland Steen – drums (2009–2012)
- Bradley Ackerman – drums, backing vocals (2014–2015)

== Discography ==
- Brand New Shoes (2007)
- Kris Allen (2009)
- Thank You Camellia (2012)
- Horizons (2014)
- Letting You In (2016)
- Somethin' About Christmas (2016)
- Pole Vaulter (2024)

== Other projects ==
The Dames Current members

- Kris Allen
- Cale Mills
- Chris Torres
- Jordan Wright

Releases

- "The Death of Mr. Jones"

Release Date: May 20, 2017
Label: DogBear Records

- "Alright Now"

Release Date: June 9, 2017
Label: DogBear Records

- "Don't Mess Around on Me"

Release Date: June 30, 2017
Label: DogBear Records

- "All That I Want Is You"

Release Date: July 28, 2017
Label: DogBear Records

== Awards and nominations ==
Year	Presenter	Award	Result
2009	Teen Choice Awards	Choice Male Reality/Variety Star	Nominated
2009	Teen Choice Awards	Choice Summer Tour (shared with American Idol Top 10)	Nominated
2010	People's Choice Awards	Break-Out Musical Artist	Nominated
2011	Billboard Music Awards	Top Christian Song – "Live Like We're Dying"	Nominated
2011	BMI Pop Music Awards	Award-Winning Songs – "Live Like We're Dying"	Won

Preceded by David Cook	American Idol winner 2009	Succeeded by Lee DeWyze
