= Caleb (given name) =

- Pronunciation: /ˈkeɪləb/ KAY-ləb
- Gender: Male

Origin
- Origin: Hebrew
- Meaning: "faithful" or "whole-hearted"

Other names
- Variant forms: Caeleb, Kaleb, Kalib
- Nickname: Cal

Caleb is a masculine given name derived from Hebrew, meaning "faithful" or "whole-hearted".

== Notable people with the name include ==
=== A ===
- Caleb F. Abbott (1811–1855), American politician
- Caleb Aekins (born 1997), Welsh rugby league footballer
- Caleb Afendopolo (1455–1523), Karaite scholar
- Caleb Agada (born 1994), Nigerian-Canadian basketball player
- Caleb Alexander (1755–1828), American writer
- Caleb Althin (1866–1919), Swedish painter
- Caleb Amankwah (born 1997), Ghanaian footballer
- Caleb J. Anderson (1910–1996), Swedish politician
- Caleb Angas (1782–1860), English agriculturist
- Caleb Antill (born 1995), Australian rower
- Caleb Aperahama (born 1996), New Zealand rugby union footballer
- Caleb Armstrong (born 1992), American stock car racing driver
- Caleb Ashworth (1722–1775), English religious figure
- Caleb Atwater (1778–1867), American politician
- Caleb Ayer (1813–1883), American politician

=== B ===
- Caleb Bacon, American football player
- Caleb Bailey (1898–1957), American naval aviator
- Caleb Baker (1762–1849), American politician
- Caleb Baldwin (disambiguation), multiple people
- Caleb Banks (born 2001), American football player
- Caleb Banks (politician) (1659–1696), English politician
- Caleb Baragar (born 1994), American baseball player
- Caleb P. Barns (1812–1866), American politician
- Caleb H. Baumes (1863–1937), American politician
- Caleb Benenoch (born 1994), American football player
- Caleb P. Bennett (1758–1836), American soldier and politician
- Caleb Bentley (1762–1851), American postmaster
- Caleb Biggers (born 1999), American football player
- Caleb Rand Bill (1806–1872), Canadian politician
- Caleb Binge (born 1993), Australian rugby league footballer
- Caleb Bingham (1757–1817), American educator
- Caleb S. Blanchard (1818–1893), American politician
- Caleb Bonham (born 1986), American businessman and television personality
- Caleb Bostic (born 1988), American football player
- Caleb Boushley (born 1993), American baseball player
- Caleb Bradham (1867–1934), American pharmacist and inventor
- Caleb Bragg (1885–1943), American racing driver
- Caleb Brantley (born 1994), American football player
- Caleb Brewster (1747–1827), American army officer
- Caleb Brousseau (born 1988), Canadian alpine skier
- Caleb Brown (born 1987), Australian rugby union footballer
- Caleb Henry Buckland, Canadian politician
- Caleb F. Buckley (1841–1879), American politician
- Caleb Burhans (born 1980), American singer-songwriter

=== C ===
- Caleb Calvert (born 1996), American soccer player
- Caleb Campbell (born 1984), American football player
- Caleb H. Carlton (1836–1923), American army officer
- Caleb Carr (disambiguation), multiple people
- Caleb Cartwright (1696–1763), Irish academic
- Caleb George Cash (1857–1916), Scottish geographer
- Caleb Castille (born 1991), American actor
- Caleb Chakravarthi (born 1999), American tennis player
- Caleb Chan, Hong Kong-Canadian businessman
- Caleb Chan (composer), Canadian composer
- Caleb Chapman (born 1973), American musician
- Caleb Cheeshahteaumuck (1644–1666), Native American scholar
- Caleb Chukwuemeka (born 2002), English footballer
- Caleb Clarke (disambiguation), multiple people
- Caleb Clay (born 1988), American baseball player
- Caleb Costner (born 1993), American stock car racing driver
- Caleb Cotham (born 1987), American baseball player
- Caleb Crain (born 1967), American novelist and writer
- Caleb Crone (1919–1958), Irish Gaelic footballer
- Caleb Cunningham (born 2005), American football player
- Caleb Cushing (1800–1879), American politician and diplomat

=== D ===
- Caleb Daniel (born 1996), Australian rules footballer
- Caleb Daniels (born 1999), American basketball player
- Caleb Davis (1738–1797), American merchant
- Caleb Dean (born 2001), American track and field athlete
- Caleb de Casper (born 1993), American singer-songwriter
- Caleb Delany (born 2000), New Zealand rugby union footballer
- Caleb S. Denny (1850–1926), American politician
- Caleb Deschanel (born 1944), American cinematographer
- Caleb Desnoyers (born 2007), Canadian ice hockey player
- Caleb Dorsey (1825–1885), American politician
- Caleb W. Dorsey (1833–1896), American military officer
- Caleb Douglas (born 2003), American football player
- Caleb Downs (born 2004), American football player
- Caleb Duarte, American artist
- Caleb Durbin (born 2000), American baseball player
- Caleb Duvernay (born 1996), American soccer player
- Caleb Q. Dyer (born 1996), American politician

=== E ===
- Caleb Ekuban (born 1994), Italian footballer
- Caleb Ekwegwo (born 1988), Nigerian footballer
- Caleb Elder, American politician
- Caleb Ellis (1767–1816), American politician and lawyer
- Caleb Etienne (born 2001), American football player
- Caleb Evans (disambiguation), multiple people
- Caleb Everett, American academic
- Caleb Ewan (born 1994), Australian cyclist

=== F ===
- Caleb Fairley (born 1973), American criminal
- Caleb Fairly (born 1987), American cyclist
- Caleb Falconer (born 2006), English cricketer
- Caleb Farley (born 1998), American football player
- Caleb Femi (born 1990), Nigerian-British author
- Caleb Ferguson (born 1996), American baseball player
- Caleb Finch (born 1939), American professor
- Caleb Finck (born 1993), American politician
- Caleb Finn (born 1994), Australian social media personality
- Caleb Flaxey (born 1983), Canadian curler
- Caleb Fleming (1698–1779), English religious figure
- Caleb Folan (born 1982), English footballer
- Caleb Foote (born 1993), American actor
- Caleb Foster (born 2004), American basketball player
- Caleb Francis (born 1968), Norwegian footballer
- Caleb Frare (born 1993), American baseball player
- Caleb Freeman (born 1998), American baseball player
- Caleb Frostman (born 1984), American politician
- Caleb Furnell (born 2001), American bobsledder
- Caleb Furst (born 2002), American basketball player
- Caleb Fyock (born 2001), American lacrosse player

=== G ===
- Caleb Gardiner, Antiguan politician
- Caleb Gardner (1739–1806), American slave trader
- Caleb Gaskins (born 2008), American basketball player
- Caleb Frank Gates (1903–1955), American historian
- Caleb Gattegno (1911–1988), British-Egyptian psychologist
- Caleb Gaylard (born 1990), New Zealand cricketer
- Caleb Gibbs (1748–1818), American military officer
- Caleb Giddings (born 1982), American competitive shooter
- Caleb Gindl (born 1988), American baseball player
- Caleb Ginyard (1910–1978), American singer
- Caleb Gordon (born 2000), American musician
- Caleb Graham (born 2000), Australian rules footballer
- Caleb Green (singer) (born 1964), American military officer
- Caleb Green (basketball) (born 1985), American basketball player
- Caleb Greenwood (1763–1850), American fur trapper
- Caleb Grill (born 2000), American basketball player

=== H ===
- Caleb O. Halsted (1792–1860), American banker
- Caleb Hamilton (born 1995), American baseball player
- Caleb Hamlin-Uele (born 1999), New Zealand rugby league footballer
- Caleb Hammer (born 1995), American YouTube personality
- Caleb Wild Hammill (1863–1921), American banker
- Caleb Hanie (born 1985), American football player
- Caleb Hanna (born 1999), American politician
- Caleb Barnes Harman (1772–1796), Irish politician
- Caleb C. Harris (1836–1904), American farmer and politician
- Caleb Harrison (1879–1938), American politician
- Caleb Hawkins, American football player
- Caleb V. Haynes (1895–1966), American military officer
- Caleb Heady (born 2004), American stock car racing driver
- Caleb Hearon (born 1995), American comedian
- Caleb Hearn (born 2000), American singer-songwriter
- Caleb Heathcote (1665–1721), English politician
- Caleb Hemmer (born 1981), American politician
- Caleb Sprague Henry (1804–1884), American clergyman
- Caleb Claiborne Herbert (1814–1867), American politician
- Caleb Hickman (born 1977), Native American biologist
- Caleb Hinkle (born 1992), American politician
- Caleb Holley (born 1990), American football player
- Caleb Holman (born 1984), American stock car racing driver
- Caleb Holt (born 2007), American basketball player
- Caleb Homesley (born 1996), American basketball player
- Caleb Hopkins (disambiguation), multiple people
- Caleb Houstan (born 2003), Canadian basketball player
- Caleb Lysander Howe (1810–1896), American photographer
- Caleb Hunt (1786–1834), American businessman
- Caleb Huntley (born 1998), American football player
- Caleb Huse (1831–1905), American military officer
- Caleb Lee Hutchinson (born 1999), American singer-songwriter

=== J ===
- Caleb Jeacocke (1706–1786), English baker and businessman
- Caleb Jean (born 1974), Haitian judoka
- Caleb Jenner (1830–1890), English politician
- Caleb Jewell (born 1997), Australian cricketer
- Caleb Johnson (disambiguation), multiple people
- Caleb Jones (disambiguation), multiple people
- Caleb Joseph (born 1986), American baseball player

=== K ===
- Caleb Kelly (disambiguation), multiple people
- Caleb Kennedy (born 2004), American singer-songwriter
- Caleb B. R. Kennerly (1830–1861), American physician
- Caleb Kilian (born 1997), American baseball player
- Caleb King (born 1988), American football player
- Caleb Kleinpeter (born 1982), American politician
- Caleb Korteweg (born 1997), New Zealand rugby union footballer
- Caleb Kporha (born 2006), English footballer
- Caleb Kramer (born 2006), Kenyan footballer

=== L ===
- Caleb Lawrence (born 1941), Canadian bishop
- Caleb Layton (disambiguation), multiple people
- Caleb Levitan (born 2010), South African chess player
- Caleb Lewis (playwright) (born 1978), Australian playwright
- Caleb Lohner (born 2001), American football and basketball player
- Caleb Lomavita (born 2002), American baseball player
- Caleb Lomax (1695–1730), British politician
- Caleb Lomu (born 2002), American football player
- Caleb Love (born 2001), American basketball player
- Caleb Lyon (1822–1875), American politician

=== M ===
- Caleb Maduoma (1950–2021), Nigerian bishop
- Caleb Clarke Magruder Jr. (1839–1923), American politician
- Caleb Makene (born 1996), New Zealand rugby union footballer
- Caleb Makwiranzou (born 1953), Zimbabwean politician
- Caleb Malhotra (born 2008), Canadian ice hockey player
- Caleb Marchbank (born 1996), Australian rules footballer
- Caleb Cain Marcus (born 1978), American photographer
- Caleb Marshall (born 1993), American fitness instructor
- Caleb Martin (disambiguation), multiple people
- Caleb McCarry (born 1961), American civil servant
- Caleb McConnell (born 1999), American basketball player
- Caleb McDuff (born 2008), British racing driver
- Caleb McLaughlin (born 2001), American actor
- Caleb J. McNulty (1816–1846), American newspaper editor and politician
- Caleb McSurdy (born 1990), American football player
- Caleb Meakins (1989–2020), Ethiopian-British entrepreneur
- Caleb Miller (born 1980), American football player
- Caleb Mills (1806–1879), American educator
- Caleb Mills (basketball) (born 2000), American basketball player
- Caleb Mitchell (born 2004), Australian rules footballer
- Caleb Montgomery (born 1995), Irish rugby union footballer
- Caleb Moore (1987–2013), American snowmobile racer
- Caleb J. Moore, American politician
- Caleb Muntz (born 1999), Fijian rugby union footballer
- Caleb Murphy (born 1999), American football player
- Caleb Mutfwang (born 1965), Nigerian lawyer and politician

=== N ===
- Caleb Navale (born 2003), Fijian rugby league footballer
- Caleb Ndiku (born 1992), Kenyan runner
- Caleb Nelson, American legal scholar
- Caleb Azumah Nelson (born 1993), British writer
- Caleb Nichols (born 1982), American musician
- Caleb Ness (born 1999), American politician
- Caleb Norkus (born 1979), American soccer player

=== O ===
- Caleb Odom (born 2005), American football player
- Caleb Okoli (born 2001), Italian footballer
- Caleb Olaniyan (1930–2009), Nigerian zoologist
- Caleb Olliff (1883–1961), New Zealand cricketer
- Caleb Ormsbee (1752–1807), American architect
- Caleb Orozco (born 1973), Belizean activist
- Caleb Orr (born 1994), American attorney
- Caleb T. O. Otto (1943–2018), Palauan physician

=== P ===
- Caleb Paine (born 1990), American sailor
- Caleb Hillier Parry (1755–1822), English physician
- Caleb Patterson-Sewell (born 1987), American soccer player
- Caleb Peacock (1841–1896), Australian politician
- Caleb Pillay (born 2000), South African cricketer
- Caleb Plant (born 1992), American boxer
- Caleb Porter (born 1975), American soccer coach
- Caleb Poulter (born 2002), Australian rules footballer
- Caleb Powell (1793–1881), Irish politician
- Caleb Powers (1869–1932), American politician
- Caleb S. Pratt (1832–1861), American political figure
- Caleb Pressley (born 1992), American comedian

=== Q ===
- Caleb Quaye (born 1948), English musician

=== R ===
- Caleb Ralph (born 1977), New Zealand rugby union footballer
- Caleb Ransaw (born 2002), American football player
- Caleb Rees (1883–1970), Welsh educator
- Caleb Rice (1792–1873), American politician and businessman
- Caleb Rich (1750–??), American minister
- Caleb Richards (born 1998), English footballer
- Caleb Ridley (1873–1932), American minister
- Caleb Roark (born 1993), American stock car racing driver
- Caleb Roberts (born 2005), English footballer
- Caleb Grafton Roberts (1898–1965), Australian army officer
- Caleb Robinson (1828–1906), English cricketer
- Caleb Rodney (1767–1840), American merchant and politician
- Caleb Rogers (born 2001), American football player
- Caleb Ross (born 1981), New Zealand television actor
- Caleb Rotheram (1694–1752), English religious figure
- Caleb Rowden (born 1982), American politician
- Caleb Rudow (born 1986/1987), American politician

=== S ===
- Caleb Saleeby (1878–1940), English physician
- Caleb Sanders (born 2000), American football player
- Caleb Sawyer (1806–1881), American politician
- Caleb Schaber (1973–2009), American artist and journalist
- Caleb Scharf (born 1968), British-American astronomer
- Caleb Schlauderaff (born 1987), American football player
- Caleb Schylander (1895–1977), Swedish footballer
- Caleb Scofield (1978–2018), American musician
- Caleb Scudder (1795–1866), American politician
- Caleb Sean (born 1986), American singer-songwriter
- Caleb Seleka (born 2002), South African cricketer
- Caleb Serong (born 2001), Australian rules footballer
- Caleb Zady Sery (born 1999), Ivorian footballer
- Caleb Shaffner (1846–1904), Canadian salesperson
- Caleb Shang (1884–1953), Chinese-Australian soldier
- Caleb Shepherd (born 1993), New Zealand rower
- Caleb Shomo (born 1992), American musician
- Caleb Shrader (born 2004), American racing driver
- Caleb Shudak (born 1997), American football player
- Caleb Simper (1856–1942), English composer
- Caleb Simpson (born 1992), American internet personality
- Caleb Silver, American journalist
- Caleb Smith (disambiguation), multiple people
- Caleb Southern (1969–2023), American musician
- Caleb Spivak, American actor
- Caleb Stanko (born 1993), American soccer player
- Caleb Stark (1759–1838), American politician
- Caleb Stegall (born 1971), American attorney
- Caleb Steph (born 1998), American rapper
- Caleb Stetson (1801–1885), American businessman and politician
- Caleb Stetson (minister) (1793–1870), American minister and Transcendentalist
- Caleb Andrew Stewart (1888–1959), Scottish mathematician
- Caleb Stidham, American politician
- Caleb Strong (1745–1819), American politician
- Caleb Sturgis (born 1989), American football player
- Caleb Suri (born 1966), American soccer player
- Caleb Surratt (born 2004), American golfer
- Caleb Swan (1758–1809), American military officer
- Caleb Swanigan (1997–2022), American basketball player

=== T ===
- Caleb Tangitau (born 2003), New Zealand rugby footballer
- Caleb Taylor (footballer) (born 2003), English footballer
- Caleb N. Taylor (1813–1887), American politician
- Caleb TerBush (born 1990), American football player
- Caleb Theodros, American politician
- Caleb Thielbar (born 1987), American baseball player
- Caleb Threlkeld (1676–1728), Irish botanist
- Caleb Tiernan (born 2003), American football player
- Caleb Timu (born 1994), New Zealand-Australian rugby footballer
- Caleb Tompkins (1759–1846), American politician
- Caleb Truax (born 1983), American boxer

=== V ===
- Caleb Vitello, American civil servant

=== W ===
- Caleb Wales (born 1988), Trinidad and Tobago football assistant referee
- Caleb Warner (1922–2017), American acoustic engineer
- Caleb Watts (born 2002), English footballer
- Caleb Wertenbaker (born 1972), American set designer
- Caleb Walton West (1844–1909), American politician
- Caleb Whitefoord (1734–1810), Scottish merchant
- Caleb Wiley (born 2004), American soccer player
- Caleb Williams (born 2001), American football player
- Caleb Williams (basketball), American basketball player
- Caleb Wilson (American football) (born 1996), American football player
- Caleb Wilson (born 2006), American basketball player
- Caleb Thomas Winchester (1847–1920), American scholar
- Caleb Windsor (born 2005), Australian rules footballer
- Caleb Smith Woodhull (1792–1866), American politician
- Caleb Woodson (born 2004), American football player
- Caleb Wright (1810–1898), English politician
- Caleb Merrill Wright (1908–2001), American judge
- Caleb Wyatt (born 1976), American motorcyclist

=== Y ===
- Caleb Yirenkyi (born 2006), Ghanaian footballer
- Caleb Young, American conductor

=== Z ===
- Caleb Zagi (born 1960), Nigerian politician

== Fictional characters ==
- Caleb Hackett, a character in the video game The Quarry
- Caleb Knight, a character in the TV series Casualty
- Caleb Morley, a vampire in the soap opera Port Charles
- Caleb Nichol, in The O.C. TV series
- Caleb Rivers, in the TV series Pretty Little Liars
- Caleb Xia, a love interest in the mobile game Love and Deepspace

== See also ==
- Kaleb (name)
- Kalib
