= Caleb (disambiguation) =

Caleb is a biblical figure.

Caleb may also refer to:

== People and fictional characters ==
- Caleb (given name), a masculine name of Hebrew origin, including a list of people and fictional characters
- Caleb (footballer), Brazilian footballer Caleb Santos Jordão Rocha Carvalho (born 1992)
- Manisha Caleb, Indian-Australian astrophysicist

== Other uses ==
- Caleb, son of Hezron, another biblical Caleb
- NOTS-EV-2 Caleb, an American space launcher of the 1950s
- Caleb University, a private university in Imota, Lagos State, Nigeria
- Caleb Technology Corp., a now defunct manufacturer of the Caleb UHD144 floptical-based floppy disk system
- "Caleb", a song on the album Unia by Finnish metal band Sonata Arctica

== See also ==
- Kaleb, King of Aksum
- Kaleb (name), a list of people with the given name or surname
- Kalev (disambiguation)
