= Kalev =

Kalev may refer to:

- Kalev (mythology), a character from Estonian mythology
- Kalev (given name), an Estonian masculine given name
- Kalev (confectioner), an Estonian sweets company
- BC Kalev, a basketball club based in Tallinn, Estonia
- BC Tallinna Kalev, a basketball club based in Tallinn, Estonia
- KK Kalev, defunct basketball club (1920–2005) based in Tallinn, Estonia
- JK Tallinna Kalev, a football club based in Tallinn, Estonia
- JK Sillamäe Kalev, a football club based in Sillamäe, Estonia
- Tallinna Kalev RFC, a rugby union club based in Tallinn, Estonia
- Kalev Tallinn, a multi-sport club in Tallinn, Estonia
- Kalev-class submarine, class of Estonian British-built submarines and leading ship of this class
- Estonian Sports Association Kalev
- Kaliv (Hasidic dynasty), the Chassidic dynasty and Rebbes of Kaliv/Kalev/Kalov
- Caleb (given name), a Biblical name, originally rendered in Hebrew as Calev
- Kalev (band), a British rock band
