= Edward Harwood =

Edward Harwood (1729–1794) was a prolific English classical scholar and biblical critic.

== Life ==
Harwood was born at Darwen, Lancashire, in 1729. After attending a school at Darwen, he went in 1745 to the Blackburn grammar school under Thomas Hunter, afterwards vicar of Weaverham, Cheshire. Hunter wished him to enter Queen's College, Oxford, with a view to the church. But his parents were Dissenters, and he was trained for the ministry in the academy of David Jennings, at Wellclose Square, London. Leaving the academy in 1750, Harwood engaged in teaching, and was tutor in a boarding-school at Peckham. He preached occasionally for George Benson, and became intimate with Nathaniel Lardner.

In 1754 Harwood moved to Congleton, Cheshire, where he superintended a grammar school, and preached alternately at Wheelock in Cheshire and Leek, Staffordshire. At Congleton he saw much of Joseph Priestley, then at Nantwich, who thought of him as a good classical scholar and entertaining companion. From 1757 he associated also with John Taylor, who in that year became divinity tutor at Warrington Academy; and in 1761 he preached Taylor's funeral sermon at Chowbent, Lancashire. An appendix to the printed sermon takes Taylor's side in disputes about the academy, against John Seddon, and shows, according to Alexander Gordon writing in the Dictionary of National Biography, that Harwood was by this time at one with Taylor's semi-Arian theology; although he says that he never adopted the tenets of Arius. His letter of 30 December 1784 to William Christie shows, for Gordon, that in later life he inclined to Socinianism.

On 16 October 1765 Harwood was ordained to the Tucker Street Presbyterian congregation, Bristol. He had married, and had a numerous family, and he describes his congregation as small. His proposals (1765) for a free translation of the New Testament, a tract against predestination, 1768, and the republication of a treatise by one William Williams on "the supremacy of the Father", made him locally unpopular. He was shunned and a charge was brought against his character, and he left Bristol in 1772. Coming to London, he settled in Great Russell Street, and employed himself in literary work. He failed to obtain a vacant place at the British Museum, but says he got a better post. Later he complained of the coldness of his dissenting friends, contrasting them unfavourably with Anglicans.

In 1776, soon after publishing a bibliography of editions of the classics, Harwood sold his classical books and took lodgings in Hyde Street, Bloomsbury. He was poor, and on 15 May 1782 he was attacked by paralysis. He had therapy by application of electricity by John Birch but could neither walk nor sit, but was still able to write and to teach. He died at 6 Hyde Street on 14 January 1794.

He claimed to have ‘written more books than any one person now living except Dr. Priestley’. Without being a follower of Priestley, he defended him (1785) against Samuel Badcock. His wife, a younger daughter of Samuel Chandler, died on 21 May 1791, aged 58. Their eldest son, Edward Harwood (numismatist), wrote a Latin epitaph to their memory.

== Works ==
He indulged his bent for classical reading, employing it in New Testament exegesis. A first volume (1767) of Introduction to New Testament Studies attracted the notice of Principal William Robertson of the University of Edinburgh, on whose recommendation he was made D.D. by Edinburgh on 29 June 1768. He published his translation of the New Testament in 1768, and another volume by way of introduction in 1771. Harwood's biblical studies received little encouragement from dissenters. Lardner just lived long enough to commend his first volume, and give some hints for a second, and other early friends were dead. Thomas Newton, bishop of Bristol, and Edmund Law, while master of Peterhouse, gave him encouragement; Robert Lowth lent him books; and the value of his work was recognised by continental scholars, his first volume being translated into German (Halle, 1770) by J. F. Schulz of Göttingen.

His biblical works are:

- ‘A New Introduction to the Study … of the New Testament,’ &c., vol. i. 1767, vol. ii. 1771; 2nd edit. 1773, 2 vols. (a third volume was projected, but not published. Harwood waited for the promised issue of a posthumous volume of biblical notes by Samuel Chandler, which never appeared).
- ‘A Liberal Translation of the New Testament … with Select Notes,’ &c., 1768. 2 vols. (appended is Clement's [first] Epistle to the Corinthians).
- ‘H ΚΑΙΝΗ ΔΙΑΘΗΚΗ … collated with the most approved MSS., with Select Notes in English,’ &c., 1776, 2 vols. (has appended bibliography of editions); his interleaved copy in the British Museum is corrected to 1 Nov. 1778.

His contributions to classical studies are:

- ‘Catulli, Tibulli, Propertii Opera,’ &c., 1774, (with revised texts).
- ‘A View of … editions of the Greek and Roman Classics,’ &c., 1775; 2nd edit., 1778; 3rd edit., 1782; 4th edit., 1790, reprinted in Adam Clarke's ‘Bibliographical Dictionary,’ Liverpool, 1801, 6 vols.; translated into German by Alter, Vienna, 1778; Italian, by Pincelli, Venice, 1780; and by Boni and Gamba, with large additions and improvements, Venice, 1793, 2 vols.; the ‘Introduction to … Editions,’ &c., 1802, by Thomas Frognall Dibdin, is a tabulated arrangement from Harwood's ‘View.’
- ‘Biographia Classica,’ &c., 2nd edit., 1778, 2 vols.

Harwood also translated from the French Abauzit's ‘Miscellanies,’ 1774, and from the German (a language which he learned after 1773) Christoph Martin Wieland's ‘Memoirs of Miss Sophy Sternheim,’ 1776, 2 vols. He edited the eleventh edition of John Holmes's Latin Grammar, 1777; the twenty-fourth edition of Nathaniel Bailey's English Dictionary, 1782; and an edition of the Common Prayer Book in Latin, ‘Liturgia … Precum Communium,’ &c., 1791, reprinted 1840. An edition of Horace bearing his name was printed in 1805.

Among his publications on general religious subjects are:

- ‘A Sermon at the Funeral of John Taylor, D.D.,’ &c., 1761.
- ‘An Account of the Conversion of a Deist,’ &c., 1762.
- ‘Reflections on … Deathbed Repentance,’ &c., 1762 (reached a third edition).
- ‘Chearful Thoughts on … a Religious Life,’ &c., 1764, (reached a second edition, and was translated into Dutch).
- ‘Confession of Faith,’ printed with Thomas Amory's sermon and Samuel Chandler's charge at his ordination, 1765.
- ‘A Letter to the Rev. Mr. Caleb Evans, occasioned by his … Confession of Faith,’ &c., 1768.
- ‘The Melancholy Doctrine of Predestination,’ &c., 1768.
- ‘The Life and Character of Jesus Christ,’ &c., 1772.
- ‘Five Dissertations,’ &c., 1772, (defines his theological position; the second dissertation ‘on the Socinian scheme’ was republished with additions, 1783, and 1786.
- ‘Of Temperance and Intemperance,’ &c., 1774.
- ‘Seven Sermons,’ &c., 1777.
- ‘The … Duty … of Contentment,’ &c., 1782.
- ‘A Letter to the Rev. S. Badcock,’ &c., 1785
- ‘Discourses,’ &c., 1790.

His ‘liberal’ 1768 rendering of the New Testament was suggested by the Latin version of Castalio. But Harwood's style was turgid prose. Here is the Lord's Prayer:

O thou great governor and parent of universal nature (God) who manifestest thy glory to the blessed inhabitants of heaven--may all thy rational creatures in all the parts of thy boundless dominion be happy in the knowledge of thy existence and providence, and celebrate thy perfections in a manner most worthy of thy nature and perfective of their own! May the glory of thy moral development be advanced and the great laws of it be more generally obeyed. May the inhabitants of this world pay as cheerful a submission and as constant an obedience to Thy will, as the happy spirits do in the regions of immortality.

His reconstructed text of the Greek Testament, 1776, was likewise neglected by his contemporaries. He based his text on the Cantabrigian and Claromontane codices, supplying their deficiencies from the Alexandrine. In a number of instances his readings anticipated the judgment of later editors.
