= Richard Hole =

English poet and antiquarian

The Reverend Richard Hole
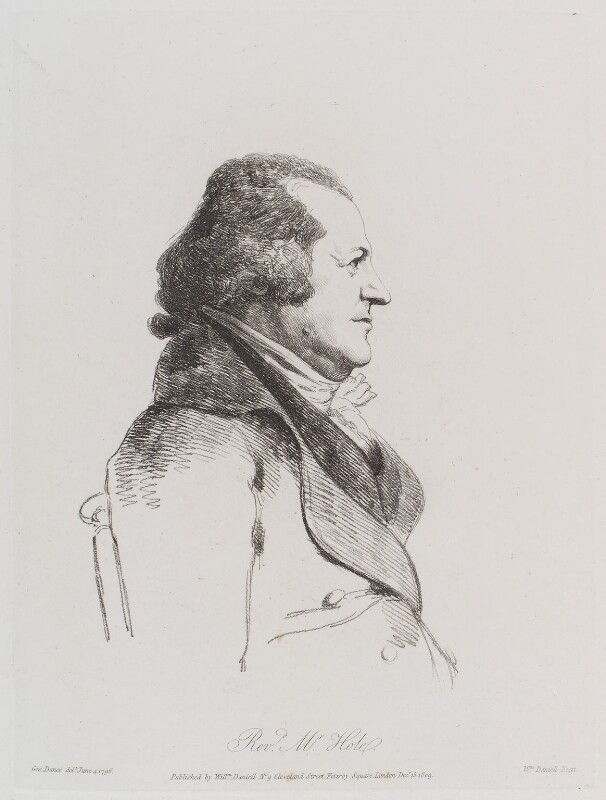
- Etching of Hole by William Daniell (15 December 1809) after a portrait by George Dance the Younger (4 June 1796)
- Province: Canterbury
- Diocese: Exeter

Personal details
- Born: 1746 Exeter, Devon, England
- Died: 28 May 1803 (aged 55/6) Exmoor, Devon, England
- Denomination: Anglican
- Spouse: Matilda Katencamp (m. 1776)
- Education: Exeter College, Oxford, BCL (3 May 1771)

Richard Hole (1746, Exeter – 28 May 1803, Exmouth) was an English poet, antiquary, and Anglican priest.

== Life ==
Richard was the son of William Hole, Archdeacon of Barnstaple and Canon of Exeter Cathedral, who died in 1791. He was born in Exeter in 1746 and educated at its grammar school, where he was famed for his dry humour and for his skill in acting. On 23 March 1764 he matriculated at Exeter College, Oxford, and graduated BCL on 3 May 1771. While at the university he wrote humorous pieces, and proposed entering the army; but after taking his degree he was ordained in the Church of England, where the influence of his father could secure him preferment.

For some time Hole served as curate of Sowton, near Exeter, and continued to hold the curacy after his presentation, in 1777, to the neighbouring vicarage of Buckerell, which was without a parsonage. In 1792 he was promoted by the Bishop of Exeter to be rector of Faringdon in the same district, and took a dispensation to retain with the rectory the benefice of Buckerell. He afterwards became rector of Inwardleigh, near Okehampton, which he enjoyed with Faringdon until his death.

After a painful illness, Hole died at Exmouth on 28 May 1803. In 1776 he married Matilda Katencamp, daughter of a merchant at Exeter, who survived him.

== Writing ==
Hole dabbled in literature from his youth. Very soon after the appearance of James Macpherson's volume of the epic poem of Fingal by the pseudonymous Ossian, he began turning it into verse, and his Poetical Translation of Fingal was published in 1772 with an Ode to Imagination, which was much admired.

At the request of Samuel Badcock, Hole rendered the second Homeric Hymn into English verse, and the translation was published at Exeter in 1781 as Homer's Hymn to Ceres. It was subsequently reprinted in Anderson's Collection of the Poets; Whittingham's edition of the British Poets; Works of the Greek and Roman Poets translated; Wakefield's edition of Pope's Odyssey; and in the Minor Poems of Homer. One expression in Hole's translation was sharply criticised by a correspondent in the Gentleman's Magazine, and in the same periodical is a letter from him explaining the circumstances of its publication and the nature of the assistance which he had received in the translation.

In 1789 Hole issued the poetical romance Arthur, or the Northern Enchantment. In seven books, a flowing poem, pronounced by the critics as "from the school of Ariosto". The notes display much knowledge of Scandinavian mythology. Hole was one of the first members of the Exeter Literary Society, and addressed to it Remarks on the Arabian Nights' Entertainments; in which the Origin of Sindbad's Voyages and other Oriental Fictions is particularly considered, which were published in an expanded form in 1797. The inquiry was begun in a sceptical mood, but the belief gradually seized him that the narratives had a basis of truth.

For some time before his death Hole was engaged on a work to be entitled Remarks on the Voyages of Ulysses as narrated in the Odyssey, but the part which was designed as an introduction was alone completed. This was in 1807 edited by his friend Bartholomew Parr, MD, of Exeter, under the title An Essay on the Character of Ulysses as delineated by Homer, in which the mental excellence and moral virtue of Ulysses are commended.

In the volumes of Poems chiefly by Gentlemen of Devonshire and Cornwall, which were edited by the Rev. Richard Polwhele in 1792, there appeared numerous poems by Hole, including two of his odes. His contributions, numbered 2, 11, 18, and 26, in the Essays by a Society of Gentlemen at Exeter, 1796, included ironical vindications of the characters of Iago and Shylock. A review in the European Magazine, which was erroneously attributed to Polwhele, led to many angry communications, some of which are in the Gentleman's Magazine, and to a savage letter from Hole to the supposed critic.

Hole assisted Badcock in his contributions to the Monthly Review, and was induced by him to render occasional aid to the London Magazine, the chief of his articles consisting of Dialogues between ideal personages. He wrote also for the British Magazine and the Gentleman's Magazine.

The common-place book which he left at his death showed abstruse reading, and among its contents was part of a translation into the Exmoor dialect of the first eclogue of Virgil. There was inserted in Blackwood's Magazine part of The Exmoor Courtship ... with Notes Critical, Historical, Philosophical, and Classical; to which is added a Paraphrase in modern English Verse. In a subsequent volume it was intimated that the paraphrase was by Hole, and some account of him, extracted from an unpublished memoir by Bartholomew Parr, was then given. This memoir was titled A slight Sketch of the Life of the late Rev. Richard Hole, LL.B., read to the Society at the Hotel on their Anniversary, August 4, 1803. Printed at their expense.

== Sources ==
- Coleridge, Henry Nelson (ed.). The Minor Poems of Homer. New York: A. Denham & Co., 1872.
- Courtney, William Prideaux (1891). "Hole, Richard" . In Lee, Sidney (ed.). Dictionary of National Biography. Vol. 27. London: Smith, Elder & Co. pp. 127–128.
- Polwhele, Richard (ed.). Poems, Chiefly by Gentlemen of Devonshire and Cornwall. 1. Bath: R. Cruttwell, 1792.
- ———. Traditions and Recollections. 1. 2. London: John Nichols & Son, 1826.
- Blackwood's Edinburgh Magazine. 4. 5. Edinburgh: W. Blackwood, 1818, 1819.
- The European Magazine. 62. London: Philological Society of London, 1796.
- The Gentleman's Magazine. 52. 58.2. 62.2. London: F. Jeffries, 1782, 1788, 1792.
