= Khitab, Republic of Dagestan =

Khitab Хитаб
- Selo
- Location within Republic of Dagestan Location within Russia
- Coordinates: 42°04′N 46°52′E
- Country: Russia
- Region: Republic of Dagestan
- District: Charodinsky District
- Time zone: UTC+3:00

Khitab (Russian: Хитаб) is a rural locality (a selo) in Charodinsky District, Republic of Dagestan, Russia. Population: 272 (2021 census); 234 (2002 census); 192 (1989 Soviet census). There is 1 street in this selo.

== Geography ==
Selo is located 18 km from Tsurib (the district's administrative centre), 112 km from Makhachkala (capital of Dagestan) and 1,702 km from Moscow. Kalib is the nearest rural locality.
