= Aperahama =

Aperahama or Āperahama is both a surname and a given name. It is a Māori transliteration of the name Abraham. Notable people with the name include:

== Surname ==
- Caleb Aperahama (born 1996), New Zealand rugby union player

== Given name ==
- Aperahama Edwards, New Zealand Māori leader
- Āperahama Tama-i-parea (fl. 1840–1882), New Zealand tribal leader
- Aperahama Taonui (died 1882), New Zealand tribal leader
