= Caleb Williams (disambiguation) =

Caleb Williams (born 2001) is an American football player.

Caleb Williams may also refer to:

- Caleb Williams (basketball), American basketball player
- Caleb Williams, the shortened title and the name of the protagonist of Things as They Are; or, The Adventures of Caleb Williams, a 1794 British novel
- Caleb Williams Saleeby (1878–1940), English physician
