= Caleb Kelly =

Caleb Kelly may refer to:

- Caleb Kelly (curator) (born 1972), New Zealand curator
- Caleb Kelly (American football) (born 1998), American football linebacker
