= Caleb Carr (disambiguation) =

Caleb Carr (1955–2024) was an American military historian.

Caleb Carr may also refer to:

- Caleb Carr (governor) (1616–1695), English politician
- Caleb Carr (New York politician), American politician
