= Caleb Meakins =

Ethiopian-born British entrepreneur, motivational speaker and YouTuber (1989–2020)

- ካሌብ ሜኪንስ
- Born: 1989; Ethiopia
- Died: 28 February 2020 (aged 30–31); Addis Ababa, Ethiopia
- Occupations: Entrepreneur; Motivational speaker; YouTuber
- Organizations: My 40 Days; Swift; Bake & Brew; Mella

YouTube information
- Channel: Ethiopia In Me
- Years active: 2016–2019
- Genres: Tour; vlog
- Subscribers: 68.2 thousand
- Views: 7.41 million
- Last updated: 25 September 2019

Caleb Meakins (Amharic: ካሌብ ሜኪንስ; 1989 – 28 February 2020) was an Ethiopian-born British entrepreneur, motivational speaker, and YouTube personality.

== Early life and career ==
Caleb was a born in 1989 to an Ethiopian mother, Ruth and British father Andy in Ethiopia. He had two sisters named Lydia and Abigail. Caleb moved to London after his father’s death in 1996 Ethiopian Airlines accident.

After graduating university, Caleb sought to establish enterprises offered by various non-profit organizations in the United Kingdom, such as Goldman Sachs, Ogilvy and Mathers. In 2013, the Loughborough University named him "Graduate of the Year" for his effort in competition run by UK job sites Adzuna and Milkround.

Aside from being an entrepreneur, he was a versatile motivational speaker. One of Caleb's contributions was an organization named My 40 Days, a social venture aimed to overcome fear of failure. Caleb became YouTube personality after learning eskista (an Ethiopian dance), which received 1.8 million views on YouTube. He ran various non-profit organizations; he was a co-founder of Shift, a British Christian movement. As a devoted Christian, the institution had registered 350 young adults, which put Swift new generation "to put their faith in Jesus and shape society, whatever their sphere of influence."

Upon returning to Addis Ababa, he founded Bake & Brew and Mella, which encouraged entrepreneurship in Ethiopia. He gave a speech once in a TED talk regarding the concept of "facing fear of failure" with 87,000 views. In addition, he created a YouTube channel named "Ethiopia In Me" in 2016, promoting the Ethiopian culture, and against migration and brain drainage.

== Death ==
On 20 February 2020, Caleb was fatally injured in a car crash, en route to Bole International Airport in Addis Ababa. A homeless man took Caleb to the nearest Korea Hospital, despite the emergency treatment costing 70,000 birr. Similarly, treatment at St. Paul's Hospital was too expensive.

He died in the hospital on the eighth day. An autopsy report concluded that Caleb had died from a severe head injury with a skull fracture in the left side of the back of his head and caught cervical vertebrae. He also had a lung infection. Caleb had remained otherwise resilient after surgeons removed a blood clot in his back and inserted chest drains into his lungs, but then quickly deteriorated into a critical condition.

On 28 February, his family announced his death on social media:

Hey friends, we come with heavy hearts to share with you all that our dear Caleb went to be with our Heavenly Father at 17:40 today and is now in glory. He passed away peacefully and without any pain. We are all still in shock. This doesn't feel real. We are feeling such deep pain and sorrow but feel comfort that he has been reunited with his creator and is now in glory. Join us while we grieve and thank God for Caleb's life and the huge impact he has had on all our lives We love you, Meakins family.

Vigil observance was held on 2 March in International Evangelical Church in Addis Ababa.
