= Kaleb (name) =

Kaleb is a masculine given name, a variant spelling of Caleb, as well as a surname.

== Given name ==
- Kaleb Beasley (born 2005), American college football player
- Kaleb Brown (born 2003), American college football player
- Kaleb Canales (born 1978), American basketball coach
- Kaleb Cowart (born 1992), American baseball player
- Kaleb Edwards (born 2007), American football player
- Kaleb Elarms-Orr (born 2003), American football player
- Kaleb Eleby (born 2000), American football player
- Kaleb Eulls (born 1991), American football player
- Kaleb Ramot Gemilang (born 1991), Indonesian basketball player
- Kaleb Hayes (born 1999), American football player
- Kaleb Jackson (born 1996), American soccer player
- Kaleb Johnson (disambiguation), multiple people
- Kaleb Konley (born 1983), American professional wrestler
- Kaleb McGary (born 1995), American football player
- Kaleb Nation (born 1988), American author
- Kaleb Ngatoa (born 2001), New Zealand racing driver
- Kaleb Nobles (born 1993/1994), American football coach
- Kaleb Nytrøen (1905–1994), Norwegian police officer
- Kaleb Ort (born 1992), American baseball player
- Kaleb Proctor (born 2004), American football player
- Kaleb Ramsey (born 1989), American football player
- Kaleb Stewart (1975–2021), American musician
- Kaleb Tarczewski (born 1993), American basketball player
- Kaleb Toth (born 1977), Canadian lacrosse player
- Kaleb Trask (born 1999), New Zealand rugby union footballer
- Kaleb Udui Jr. (born 1966), Palauan politician
- Kaleb Weis (born 1983/1984), American politician
- Kaleb Wesson (born 1999), American basketball player

== Surname ==
- Ante Kaleb (born 1993), Croatian handball player
- Antonija Kaleb (born 1986), Croatian volleyball player
- Darius Kaleb, American actor
- Nikša Kaleb (born 1973), Croatian handball player
- Vjekoslav Kaleb (1905–1996), Croatian writer

== See also ==
- Caleb (given name)
- Kalib
