= Kalev (given name) =

Male given name

- Gender: Male
- Language: Estonian

Origin
- Region of origin: Estonia

Other names
- Related names: Kalevi

Kalev is an Estonian masculine given name, derived from national folk hero Kalev. Related Finnish names are Kaleva and Kalevi.

Its meaning is most often "giant", "tall strong man". The etymology is uncertain. The Russian word голова (golova), "head" as in "headman" has been suggested, but is linguistically anachronistic. However, it could be Baltic (kalējs, "smith"), Finnic (kalea, "cool, hard") or Norse (Hlér, a sea god, from *xlewaz, or *xalewaz with an epenthetic vowel). It appears in historical records from 15th century onwards, although an uncertain mention dates to the 12th century.

People named Kalev include:

- Kalev Aigro (born 1959), Nordic combined skier
- Kalev Arro (1915–1974), partisan
- Kalev Ermits (born 1992), biathlete and cross-country skier
- Kalev Kallemets (born 1979), politician
- Kalev Kallo (born 1948), politician
- Kalev Kesküla (1959–2010), writer
- Kalev Mark Kostabi, known as Mark Kostabi (born 1960), American painter
- Kalev Kotkas (born 1960), Estonian politician
- Kalev Leetaru, American internet entrepreneur and academic
- Kalev Lillo (born 1966), Estonian politician
- Kalev Muru (born 1954), Estonian mountaineer
- Kalev Sepp, American military analyst and strategist and former military officer
