= Caleb Evans =

Calab Evans may refer to:

- Caleb Evans (geologist) (1831–1886), English geologist
- Caleb Evans (quarterback) (born 1998), gridiron football quarterback
