= Caleb Carr (New York politician) =

American politician

Caleb Carr was an American politician. He was the representative of Otsego County, New York State in 60th New York State Legislature.
