= Caleb Cain Marcus =

American photographer

Caleb Cain Marcus is an American photographer, living in New York City.

== Life and work ==
Cain Marcus was born in Colorado. He received his MFA from Columbia University.

The book The Silent Aftermath of Space was published in 2010. Robert Frank introduced the artist—"His view shows a quiet resignation and jubilation for being an artist and alone." The series of twenty dense black and white photographs focused on New York City. They showed spaces devoid of people in the darkness.

The book A Portrait of Ice was published in 2012. The series of thirty color images depicted glaciers from Patagonia, Iceland, Alaska, Norway and New Zealand. The photo critic Marvin Heiferman, whose essay was included in the book, introduces the work as, "eerily gorgeous… like the eccentrically rendered landforms you might soar over in a dream…"

Critic, Mark Feeney, reviewed Cain Marcus' large images for The Boston Globe. "[The work has] an inherent painterliness that would have made Caspar David Friedrich's Romantic soul swoon. Swooning is not uncalled for. These images seem to belong to their own unique medium — in the same way that this terrain and climate belong to their own unique world."

== Publications ==
- The Silent Aftermath of Space. Bologna, Italy: Damiani. ISBN 978-88-6208-112-2. With a foreword by Robert Frank.
- A Portrait of Ice. Damiani, Bologna, Italy, September 2012. With text by Marvin Heiferman and Robin Bell A Portrait of Ice.

== Awards ==
- 2010: International Photography Award in the category of books
- 2013: William H. Eells National Colloquium Artist

== Collections ==
Cain Marcus' work is included in the following public collections:

- Metropolitan Museum of Art, New York
- Museum of Fine Arts Houston, Houston
- The High Museum of Art, Atlanta
- Joseph M Cohen Family Collection, New York
- University of Michigan Museum of Art, Ann Arbor
- Hood Museum of Art, Hanover
- Delaware Art Museum, Wilmington
- Samek Art Museum, Bucknell University
- Mead Art Museum, Amherst College
- Newcomb Art Museum, Tulane University
