= Caleb Spivak =

American actor, model, and entrepreneur

Caleb J. Spivak
- Occupations: Actor, Model, and Entrepreneur
- Known for: Founder What Now Atlanta (WNA)

Caleb J. Spivak is an American actor, model, and entrepreneur. He is the founder of What Now Atlanta (WNA), a news resource for openings and closings in Atlanta's restaurants, retail and real estate.

== Early life ==
Born in Upper Heyford, Oxfordshire, England to Air Force veterans Mark Ian and Lisa Hay Spivak, Caleb and his older brother Joshua Aaron Spivak, began performing together on stages while growing up in New York City, Italy and other locations where the military work took his family to.

== Career ==
Caleb J. Spivak moved to Atlanta in 2007 and attended Georgia State University pursuing a degree in Theatre and Journalism but later dropped out to build a career in the film and television industry as the Hollywood enterprise boomed in the South.

In 2010, Caleb founded What Now Atlanta; a news source for restaurant, retail, and multifamily openings and closings in Atlanta while working as Director of Social Media & Emerging Technologies for Commercial Real Estate Developer North American Properties (NAP). He first joined NAP in 2011 to develop a Social Media strategy to revitalize Atlantic Station, a failing mixed-use development in Midtown Atlanta.

In early 2015, Caleb began studying the Meisner technique with actor and acting coach Erin Elizabeth Burns known for her role in Stephen King’s Cell. He also booked his first television role as "Harvey Robinson" in Your Worst Nightmare; a TV Series documentary produced by Crazy Legs Productions for Investigation Discovery within the same year.

In 2017, Caleb performed the role of Biometric Operator in the American television series 24: Legacy produced by Twentieth Century Fox for the Fox Network.

== Filmography ==
Year	Title	Role	Notes
2015	Your Worst Nightmare	Harvey Robinson	TV series documentary
2016	Snapped: Killer Couples	John Hawkins	TV series documentary
2016	Fun Town	Tanner	Short
2016	Good Behavior	Hot Guy	TV series
2016	My Annoying Dead Brother	Brandon Hayes	TV series
2017	Legends & Lies	Captain Corydon Heath	TV series
2017	#Murder	John Fox	TV series
2017	24: Legacy	Biometric Operator	TV series
2017	Release	Robert	Feature
2017	Truth or Double Dare (TODD)	Jonathan	Feature
2017	Jodi Arias Special	Travis Alexander	TV series
2017	Oscar Pistorius: Blade Runner Killer	Stephen Terrero	Feature
2017	Dead Silent	Terry Childs	TV series
2021	Witnesses	Oliver Cowdery	Film
