= Caleb Andrew Stewart =

Scottish mathematician

Caleb Andrew Stewart FRSE (16 September 1888 – 5 August 1959) was a 20th-century Scottish mathematician. He is noted as a Fellow of the Royal Society of Edinburgh.

== Life ==
He was born on 16 September 1888 in Glasgow the son of John Stewart, a patternmaker. He attended Barrowfield Primary School then John Street Higher Grade School, completing his education at the High School of Glasgow. He then studied Mathematics and Physics at Glasgow University graduating MA in 1909, BSc in 1910. Winning a Ferguson Scholarship he attended Cambridge University gaining a further BA in 1912. He then began lecturing at the City and Guilds College in London.

In the First World War he served as a 2nd Lieutenant in the 8th Wiltshire Regiment, serving in France and Salonika, before transferring to the Royal Engineers as a full Lieutenant. After the war he began lecturing at Sheffield University. Glasgow University awarded him an honorary doctorate (DSc) in 1928.

In 1950 he was elected a Fellow of the Royal Society of Edinburgh. His proposers were Robert Pollock Gillespie, Richard Robb, Alexander Aitken and Daniel Edwin Rutherford.

He died in Bristol on 5 August 1959.

== Publications ==
- Treatise on Advanced Calculus (1946)
