= Caleb Martin =

Caleb Martin may refer to:

- Caleb Martin (American football) (1924–1994), American football tackle
- Caleb Martin (basketball) (born 1995), American basketball player
- Caleb Martin House, historic house in Connecticut
