= Caleb Gardiner =

Antigua and Barbuda politician

Member of the Senate of Antigua and Barbuda
- In office 23 January 2023 – 3 August 2023; Government senator
- Succeeded by: Dwayne George

Personal details
- Political party: Antigua and Barbuda Labour Party

Caleb Gardiner is an Antigua and Barbuda Labour Party politician, who was appointed to the Senate of Antigua and Barbuda for the government on 23 January 2023. Gardiner was replaced by Dwayne George on 3 August 2023 to become a diplomat in Washington, D.C.

In 2023 Gardiner was nominated for the Overall Caribbean Youth of the Year Award by the Caribbean Regional Youth Council’s Caribbean Youth awards and was also recognized as one of the region’s 35 most influential game-changers and visionaries by the Caribbean Regional Youth Council.
