= Graduate of the Year (UK) =

Graduate of the Year is a national competition in the United Kingdom. It is held annually and recognises students who have made the most of university life, whether in an academic or extracurricular context, such as showing exceptional teamwork, charity or volunteering work, taking part in leadership projects and so on. Every year thousands of high-calibre students from across the country compete in several rounds for this prestigious award, with national press coverage and large cash prizes. It is run by Real World magazine, the UK's biggest student careers publication and the founding sponsor was the UK's largest accountancy firm PricewaterhouseCoopers. The awards are now sponsored by Enterprise Rent-A-Car.

Founded in 2004, over 2004–07 the format was one 'Graduate of the Year' with two runners-up and two-finalists. From 2008 they split into individual awards for Entrepreneur of the Year, Social Responsibility etc.

== 2009 ==
Winner: Charlie Hogg (Lancaster) won the Entrepreneur of the Year award.

== 2008 ==
- Winner: Jonathan Francis (Nottingham) won the PwC Entrepreneur of the Year award for his work in digitising the antiques sector. He subsequently supported The University of Nottingham in winning The Times Higher Education Award for Entrepreneurial University of the Year 2009. . He presently works for Google's ideas team in the field of data, AI & automation.
- Winner: Joel Raffel (Oxford) and Sean Nuzum (Southampton) jointly won the Contribution to University award.
- Winner: Rob Smith and Nick Ellison (Warwick) won the Club and Society award (Skydiving), for their focus on running charity events alongside club activities. They now run their own charity experience and event management company.
- Winner: Chris Skilton and Laura Sterling jointly won the Socially Responsible award.

== 2007 ==
- Winner: Alexander McLean (Nottingham) was involved in setting up his own charity whilst at university, African Prisons Project, as well as being Vice-President of the University branch of UNICEF. He hopes to work as a barrister in Africa in the future.
- Runners up: David Langer (Oxford) was President of the university table tennis and motor racing teams and ran a start-up; he is now a full-time internet entrepreneur. Xin Hui Chan (Oxford) has been involved in healthcare campaigning; she is now a doctor.

== 2006 ==
- Winner: Kirill Makharinsky (Oxford) was President of Oxford Entrepreneurs, the 2nd largest society in Oxford University, ran several businesses, was a concert pianist, played several sports at university level and achieved a double first in Mathematics. He is now working in Moscow, Russia on an e-travel start-up Ostrovok.ru, which he co-founded in 2011 after successfully founding YouNoodle.
- Runners up: Jonathan Bailey (Oxford) worked in debating, drama and journalism. After a 2-year stint at McKinsey he now works for Tony Blair. Jennifer Lambert (Leeds) produced international guidelines on child abuse; she is now a doctor.
- Meanwhile, finalist Harjeet Taggar (Oxford) went on to sell his internet start-up for $5m.
- Finalist Adam Taylor (Warwick). Adam Taylor ran several business and funded himself through university whilst achieving a First class honours in Manufacturing Engineering. Upon graduating Adam joined Lehman Brothers investment bank and then turned internet entrepreneur to co-found PetShop.co.uk. PetShop.co.uk is a home delivery, online pet shop. After the success of PetShop.co.uk Adam has now applied the same customer service and discount pricing to household and health & beauty products and launched Brandreill.co.uk August 2011.
- Finalist Shazia Saleem (Warwick) went on to launch her own business 'ieat foods' – the UK's first British favourites halal prepared foods brand. ieat launched 12 lines into Sainsbury's in February 2014 with a launch in Tesco less than 3 months later, making ieat the UK's largest ever ready meal brand launch by a start up

== 2005 ==
- Winner: Hazel Mowbray (LSE) was a music teacher at two schools, taught piano, played in University of London's orchestra, was a legal caseworker, rower and Disabilities Officer who has worked in Ecuador and Ethiopia, along with getting a 1st class degree. She now works for the United Nations World Food Programme in Malawi.
- Runners up: Anjool Malde (Oxford) worked for BBC and held 20 university positions; he was a stockbroker at Deutsche Bank until his death. Lauren Buchanan (LSE) raised £25k for Habitat for Humanity and ran a Methodist Society.
- Finalists: Shaun Delaney (Leicester) coordinated and overhauled the student telephone help line, Nightline, as well as leading a variety of other student groups. Joanna Odds (Glasgow) resurrected the Student Charities Appeal and took on the sabbatical role of Senior Vice President.

== 2004 ==
- Winner: Conall Watson (Nottingham) was Environment & Social Justice Officer, who organised One World Week, got the student union to boycott Nestle, co-founded the Tibet Society and worked at the Fair Trade cafe; he is now a pharmacist.
- Runners-up: Nicholas Fernie (Lancaster) was college charity rep, raised money for Oxfam, a homeless shelter, organised a marathon, dance lessons, and was Treasurer and Press officer for Amnesty International. Hannah Marder (Bristol) voted in Union elections, attended the AGM, read the student paper, drunk in the student bar and wore the University sweatshirt.
- Finalists: Ahsan Shah (London Metropolitan) founded National Black Youth Forum, worked on TimeBank and has done anti-racism work. Katy Standish (Durham) has volunteered for Tees Valley Wildlife Trust and worked in Indonesian rainforests.
