= Samuel Badcock =

English nonconformist minister, theological writer and literary critic

Samuel Badcock (1747–1788) was an English nonconformist minister, theological writer and literary critic.

== Life ==
He was born at South Molton, Devon on 23 February 1747. His parents were dissenters, and he was educated in a school at Ottery St. Mary, for the sons of those opposed to the Church of England. He was trained for the dissenting ministry, and in 1766 became the pastor of a congregation at Wimborne in Dorset. After three years of residence in that county he was appointed to a similar post at Barnstaple in Devon, and remained there until 1778.

He became known, through his contributions to the Theological Repository to Joseph Priestley, and sought his acquaintance in correspondence, and personally by a journey to Bowood, where Priestley was living with Lord Shelburne. Badcock adopted some of Priestley's theological views, and this led to an estrangement from his congregation at Barnstaple. Badcock returned to South Molton, where he ministered from 1778 to 1786, when he became dissatisfied with the doctrines of dissent and with the position assigned to its ministers. He was a friend of Samuel Taylor Coleridge's father John who also lived in South Molton and then Ottery St. Mary, and either Samuel Badcock or John Neale Badcock (whose children were named Sam and Harry) supported the younger Coleridge at Christ's Hospital with money and clothing in 1785, three years after the death of the elder.

He sought for ordination in the Church of England, and, having obtained a title for the curacy of Broad Clyst, was ordained by John Ross, bishop of Exeter, becoming deacon and priest within a week in June 1787. Harassed by failing health and money troubles, he assisted for the last six months of his life at the Octagon Chapel, Bath; and whilst on a visit to Sir John Chichester, one of his Devon patrons, at his town house in Queen Street, Mayfair, London, died on 19 May 1788.

== Works and controversies ==
Most of Badcock's contributions to literature appeared in the magazines of the day. From 1774, when he sent to the Westminster Magazine a series of articles, until his death, his services were in constant demand. He wrote in the Gentleman's Magazine, the London Magazine, General Evening Post, and St. James's Chronicle, but his best known contributions appeared in the Monthly Review. He was likewise a poet prefiguring the Romantic, return-to-nature genre of Wordsworth and Coleridge, with a poem titled "The Hermitage" composed in 1781 "on a sweet sequestered spot in that highly cultivated and elegant seat Castle-Hill, the residence of Earl of Fortescue near South-Molton" after he re-settled there.

Although he had been friendly with Priestley, and had published in 1780 'A slight Sketch of the Controversy between Dr. Priestley and his Opponents,' a severe notice from his pen of the doctor's 'History of the Corruptions of Christianity' appeared in the pages of the Monthly Review for June 1783. This, and an article by him the next year on 'Priestley's Letters to Dr. Horsley,' produced two answers from Priestley and pamphlets from J. E. Hamilton and Edward Harwood.

While living at Barnstaple, Badcock became acquainted with the daughter of Samuel Wesley, the master of Blundell's School in Tiverton and elder brother of John Wesley. The letters and anecdotes which he obtained from her were transmitted by him to the Westminster Magazine in 1774. A subsequent account, based on her statements, of the Wesley family, provoked a correspondence with John Wesley; this biography was printed in the Bibliotheca Topographica Britannica, and reprinted, with the letters which it occasioned, in John Nichols's Literary Anecdotes. Several letters from Wesley which Badcock gave to Priestley were published by the latter in 1791 under the title of 'Original Letters by Rev. John Wesley and his Friends.' A sermon which Badcock preached at the Octagon Chapel, Bath, for the benefit of the General Infirmary, 23 December 1787, was printed for private distribution.

After Badcock's death, his friend Rev. Robert Burd Gabriel alleged that he was the virtual author of Dr. Joseph White's Bampton lectures on the effects of Christianity and Mahometanism. A fierce war of words raged in the papers. Dr. Gabriel published 'Facts relating to the Rev. Dr. White's Bampton lectures,' and the lecturer rejoined with 'A Statement of Dr. White's Literary Obligations to the late Rev. Mr. Samuel Badcock and the Rev. Samuel Parr, LL.D.' (1790).

The papers which William Chapple had collected for an improved edition of Tristram Risdon's Survey of Devon, were entrusted to Badcock's care for arrangement and revision. The prosecution of the work was stopped by Badcock's death.
