= Caleb Clarke =

Caleb Clarke may refer to:

- Caleb Clarke (soccer), Canadian soccer player
- Caleb Clarke (rugby union), New Zealand rugby union player
