= Caleb J. Moore =

American politician

Member of the Washington House of Representatives for the 21st district
- In office 1893–1895; 1897–1903

Personal details
- Party: People's Party; Populist; Democratic

Caleb J. Moore was an American politician in the state of Washington. He served in the Washington House of Representatives.
