= Caleb Fyock =

American lacrosse player

No. 18 – Ohio State Buckeyes
- Position: Goalie
- Class: Junior

Personal information
- Born: -2001; Bowie, Maryland
- Listed height: 6 ft 2 in (1.88 m)
- Listed weight: 298 lb (135 kg)

Career information
- High school: Saint John College High School
- College: Ohio State (2022-present)

Caleb ("Big Tasty") Fyock (born ~2001 in Bowie, Maryland) is an American Lacrosse goalie. He has been with the Ohio State Buckeyes for the three years he has been in college.

== Early life ==
Fyock attended Saint John College High School. Fyock was the number 11-ranked player in the 2023 recruiting class. His father was a big reason he got into lacrosse. Rob Fyock is a long-time lacrosse goalie coach, and his mother is the reason his brother (Aleric Fyock) got into the sport of lacrosse.

== College career ==
Fyock committed to Ohio State University in November 2022. " I chose Ohio State because of the culture and all the tools put in place to help me succeed on and off the field. I also chose Ohio State because I love the city of Columbus and the fanbase." Fyock's quoted reason for committing to Ohio State. In his freshman season, Fyock started all 14 games, posting a .517 save percentage with 479 shots faced, and finished the year with a 5-9 record in 2024. Fyock was named Big Ten freshman of the week twice in the 2024 season, once following his win against Bellarmine (10-6) and the other after the team's 12-4 victory over Air Force. Fyock had 17 saves, 5 groundballs, and 1 forced turnover that week. His Second freshman of the week came from his victory against No.19 Rutgers, with the team winning 14-8. Fyock had 12 saves. In his sophomore season, Fyock started 16 of 17 games with a .612 save percentage with 535 shots faced, ending the season 14-3, losing in the playoffs to Notre Dame.

== Where he got his Nickname ==
Fyock got his nickname "Big Tasty" at a young age while watching The Goldbergs. Fyock said he felt a connection with the middle child, who would call himself Big Tasty. Caleb Fyock, also being the middle child, liked the nickname more.
