= Caleb Jones =

Caleb Jones may refer to:

- Caleb Landry Jones (born 1989), American actor and musician
- Caleb Jones (politician) (born 1980), in the Missouri House of Representatives
- Caleb Jones (ice hockey) (born 1997), American ice hockey player
- Caleb Jones (javelin thrower) (born 1991), 2015 Canadian national javelin champion
- Caleb Jones (Loyalist) (c. 1743–1816), defendant in the 1799 freedom suit R v Jones (New Brunswick)
- Caleb Jones (American football) (born 1999), American football player

== See also ==
- Caleb Johnson (born 1991), American singer
- Cayleb Jones (born 1993), American football player
