= Kalib =

Kalib is a masculine given name, a variant spelling of Caleb, as well as a surname.

- Kalib Starnes (born 1975), Canadian mixed martial artist
- Sylvan Kalib (1929–2025), American music theorist

== See also ==
- Caleb (given name)
- Kaleb (name)
