= Caleb Dorsey =

American politician

- Born: May 25, 1825; Ellicott Mills; Anne Arundel County; Maryland
- Died: March 29, 1885 (aged 59); Sonora, California
- Occupation: Lawyer
- Known for: District Attorney for Tuolumne County, California

Caleb Dorsey (May 25, 1825 – March 29, 1885) was an attorney in Tuolumne County, California who was elected as District Attorney of the county on two separate occasions. Born in Ellicott Mills, Anne Arundel County, Maryland, Dorsey attended Harvard Law School through his Junior year, but left before graduating. He had also attended Rockville Academy in Rockville, Maryland, but in 1850 joined the gold rush and left for California.

In 1879 elections Dorsey was a candidate for an Associate Justice of the California Supreme Court. He ran on the New Constitution Party ticket.

Reports of his death state that Dorsey died suddenly, and unexpectedly, on March 29, 1885, at his home in Sonora due to a "spasmodic affection of the throat". He left behind his wife, Esther Maria McNabb-Dorsey, three daughters and a son. At the time of his death, he was serving as a Regent for the California State University, and as a director of the Stockton Insane Asylum, having been recently appointed to both posts by Governor George Stoneman. The Tuolumne Bar Association honored Dorsey on April 1, 1885, by submitting an official resolution to the court recognizing Dorsey's longtime contributions to the County and State.

== The Caleb Dorsey cousins ==
Attorney Caleb Dorsey is sometimes confused with his cousin, Colonel Caleb Dorsey. Both Caleb Dorseys were born in Maryland, and both migrated to California. Attorney Caleb Dorsey arrived in California in 1850 and lived, and died, in Tuolumne County. Colonel Caleb Dorsey arrived in California in 1865 and resided in neighboring Stanislaus County, but like his cousin, also died in Tuolumne County. The Colonel earned his military title while serving in the Army of the Confederate States of America. Attorney Caleb Dorsey, already in California before the start of the American Civil War, did not participate in the conflict. Another possible point of confusion is Attorney Caleb Dorsey's son who was also named Caleb. His son, Caleb C. Dorsey, was born in Tuolumne County in 1868 and died there in 1910. Colonel Caleb Dorsey never married, and is not known to have had any children.
