= Caleb Gaylard =

New Zealand cricketer (born 1990)

Personal information
- Born: 25 September 1990 (age 36); Wellington, New Zealand
- Source: Cricinfo, 29 October 2020

Caleb Gaylard (born 25 September 1990) is a New Zealand cricketer. He played in one first-class match for Central Districts in 2014.

In a senior club match in November 2023, playing for Taradale against Central Hawke's Bay, Gaylard took a hat-trick early in the innings, then another four wickets in four balls later in the innings. All the dismissals were either bowled or leg before wicket.
