= Caleb Baldwin =

Caleb Baldwin may refer to:

- Caleb Baldwin (boxer) (1769–1827), English lightweight boxer
- Caleb Baldwin (judge) (1824–1876), chief justice of the Iowa Supreme Court
- Caleb Cook Baldwin (1820–1911), American Presbyterian missionary
- Caleb Dodd Baldwin, partner in the Pennsylvania architecture firm of Dodd & Baldwin

== See also ==
- Caleb Baldwin House, historic hall and parlor plan house in Beaver, Utah
- Caleb Baldwin Tavern, historic house in Newtown, Connecticut
