= Caleb Hopkins =

Caleb Hopkins may refer to:

- Caleb Hopkins (Upper Canada politician) (1785–1880), farmer and politician in Upper Canada
- Caleb Hopkins (colonel) (1770–1818), War of 1812 hero, first town supervisor of Pittsford, New York
