= Caleb W. Dorsey =

American politician

Caleb W Dorsey
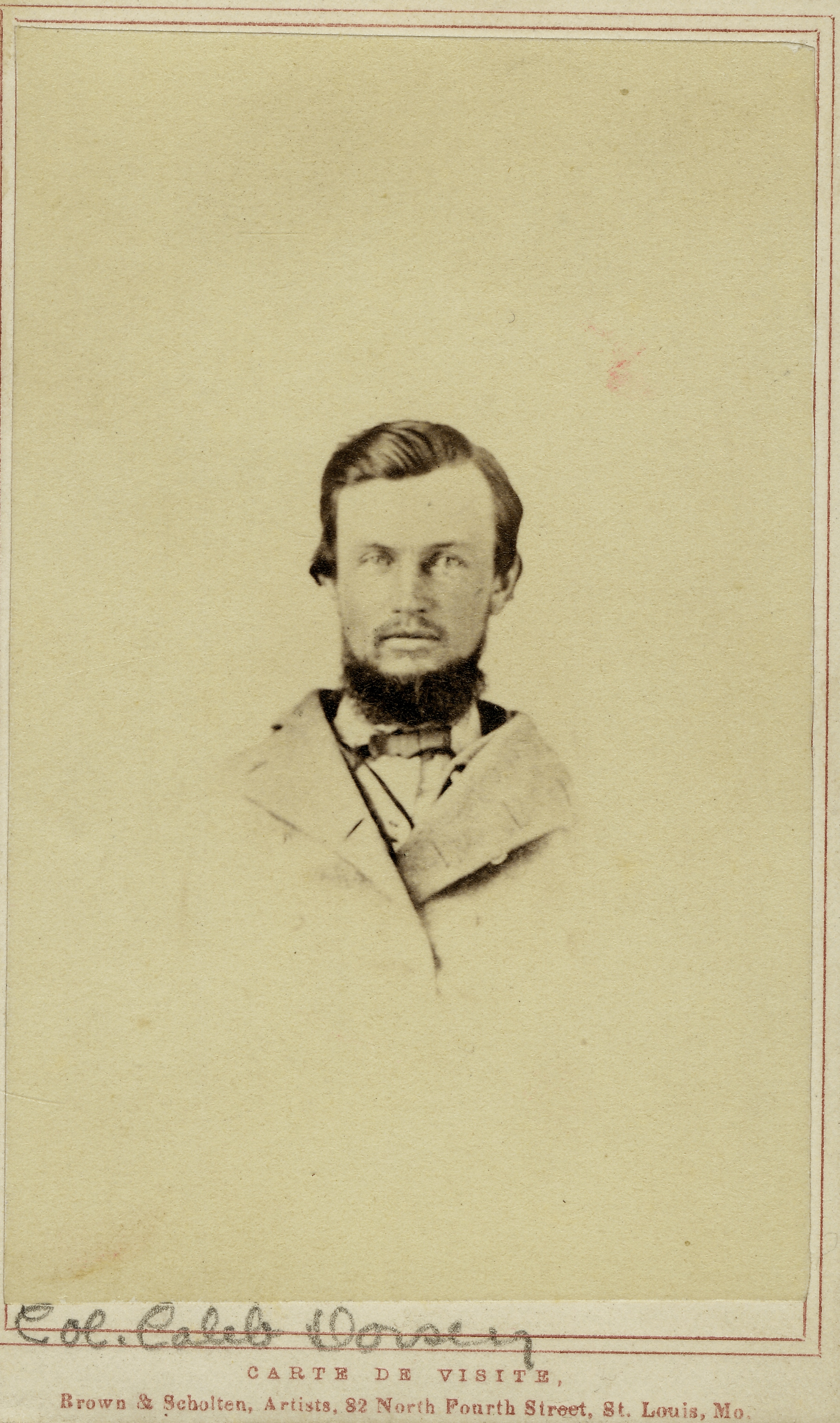
- Carte de visite
- Born: September 7, 1833; Baltimore County, Maryland, US
- Died: April 21, 1896 (aged 62); Tuolumne County, California, US
- Military career
- Allegiance: Confederate States of America
- Branch: Missouri State Guard; Confederate States Army
- Service years: 1861-1864
- Rank: Colonel
- Unit: Slayback`s Missouri Cavalry Regiment
- Commands: 4th Cavalry Regiment (MSG); Dorsey`s Missouri Cavalry Battalion
- Conflicts: American Civil War

Caleb W. Dorsey (September 7, 1833 – April 21, 1896), or Colonel Caleb Dorsey, served in the Missouri State Guard and the Army of the Confederate States of America during the American Civil War. After the war he became a California State Assembly member between 1877 and 1878.

== Civil War Service ==
Prior to the start of the war Dorsey was a resident of Pike County, Missouri and served as Sergeant Co. D, 2nd United States Cavalry from 1855-1861.

During the Civil War he served as Major in the 4th Cavalry Regiment of the Second Division of the Missouri State Guard. Given authority to recruit a regiment for the Missouri State Guard, he served as colonel of his own provisional unit. This regiment was nearly destroyed at the Battle of Mount Zion Church in Dec. 1861. Dorsey was captured Feb. 15, 1862

Dorsey commanded a cavalry squadron in Confederate service in November 1862 in Arkansas, and after several engagements it disbanded sometime in 1863. Dorsey was in command of his "Missouri Squadron" at the battle of Fayetteville, Arkansas, on April 18, 1863. Dorsey was recruiting again in Northeast Missouri in advance of Sterling Price's Raid into Missouri in 1864. He was unable to join the raiders and eventually made his way to Arkansas with a much reduced command. These were merged into Slayback's battalion to form a regiment with Dorsey serving as Lt. Col.

== Post-war and death ==
After the war Dorsey migrated to California where he developed a large ranch in Stanislaus County, just outside of Oakdale, with his brothers. In addition to farming the land, they bred and raced thoroughbred horses. Dorsey also operated several mining claims, and was active in politics. From 1869 to 1873 he served on the Stanislaus County Board of Supervisors, and in 1877 and 1878 he served as a California State Assembly member for the 22nd Assembly.

Dorsey operated one of his mines, the Snell Mine near Columbia in Tuolumne County, with a partner, J. T. Newcomer. During a visit to the mine on April 21, 1896, the partners had an argument that resulted in Newcomer shooting, and killing, Dorsey. Newcomer was tried for murder and found guilty, but then found not guilty in a second trial.

== Cousins ==
Colonel Caleb Dorsey is sometimes confused with his cousin, Attorney Caleb Dorsey. Both Caleb Dorseys were born in Maryland, and both migrated to California. Attorney Caleb Dorsey arrived in California in 1850 and lived, and died, in Tuolumne County. Colonel Caleb Dorsey arrived in California in 1865 and resided in neighboring Stanislaus County, but like his cousin, also died in Tuolumne County. The Colonel earned his military title while serving in the Army of the Confederate States of America. Attorney Caleb Dorsey, already in California before the start of the American Civil War, did not participate in the conflict. Another possible point of confusion is Attorney Caleb Dorsey's son who was also named Caleb. His son, Caleb C. Dorsey, was born in Tuolumne County in 1868 and died there in 1910. Colonel Caleb Dorsey never married, and is not known to have had any children.

== Notes ==
- Petersen Richard C., McGhee, James E., Lindberg, Kip A., and Daleen, Keith A., Sterling Price's Lieutenants, Revised Expanded Edition, Two Trails Publishing, 2007
- McGhee, James E., Guide to Missouri Confederate Units, 1861-1865, University of Arkansas Press, 2008
