= Kalev (band) =

Kalev was an English rock band that formed in 2004 based in London, England. It was characterized by serrated white noise textures, heavy beats, intertwining guitars and dark lyrics. Members include Sam Handley (Bass Guitar), Oliver Hickman (Percussion), Andrew Nicholls (Vocals, Guitar), Cian O'Neill (Electronics), and Ben Tarrant-Brown (Lead Guitar).

Kalev's live set was often played as one piece. The band was influenced by the music of Depeche Mode, At The Drive-In / The Mars Volta, Nick Cave and The Bad Seeds, The Doors, Mark Lanegan, Tool and Joy Division.

== History ==
The band released three singles on Road Movie Revival and Owlsnake Records. The debut single "Undoing" was released in November 2005 and charted at No. 83 in the UK Singles Chart. The single was winner of a listeners' poll on Zane Lowe's BBC Radio 1 show Fresh Meat.

The second single, "Cutting at Nothing", was released in 2006 and charted at No. 3 in the UK Rock Chart. The single was winner of an XFM 'Drive-time' New Singles listeners' poll in the week of release. Kalev recorded an 'Xposure' session with the XFM John Kennedy show in November 2005. They toured England and headlined 'Club Frog' at the Mean Fiddler in London in April 2006. A double A-side, "Slight Death of You" / "Glass Crowd" was released in May 2007.

Kalev's music, while typically possessing a strong rhthymnic pulse, varied song by song. A dark tone and tenor persisted throughout. Samples (often vocal-led, or found sound-based) were used for tone and narrative. Common themes to their lyrics: violence, sex and intoxication.

Live and single reviews featuring the band were published as well as editorial new release recommendations in NME and Artrocker magazines. Artrocker published a feature piece on Kalev in July 2007. The band finished in early 2008.
