= Kalev Kesküla =

Estonian journalist and writer (1959–2010)

Kalev Kesküla (22 October 1959 – 25 June 2010) was an Estonian journalist and writer.

Kesküla was born in Tallinn. In 1983, he graduated from the University of Tartu in Estonian philology.

From 1983 to 1991, he worked as an editor for Estonian Encyclopaedia Publishers. In 1991, he became an editor and columnist for the newspaper Eesti Ekspress and its culture supplement Areen.

He was also an expert on wine. He wrote the first wine encyclopedia in Estonian.

== Works ==
- 1986: poetry collection "Läbi linnaöö" (Through the City Night)
- 1998: poetry collection "Vabariigi laulud" (Songs of the Republic)
- 2010: prose collection "Elu sumedusest" (A Life of Tenderness)
