= Caleb Smith =

Caleb Smith may refer to:

- Caleb B. Smith (1808–1864), American journalist and politician
- Caleb Smith (skeleton racer) (born 1983), American skeleton racer
- Caleb Smith (baseball) (born 1991), American baseball pitcher
- Caleb L. Smith (1829–1890), American builder and politician from New York
- Caleb Smith, protagonist in the film Ex Machina

== See also ==
- Kaleb Smith (born 2004), Australian rules footballer
