= Caleb Kelly (curator) =

New Zealand curator, author and educator

Caleb Kelly (born Caleb Stuart 1972 in Dunedin) is a curator, author and educator from New Zealand currently based in Sydney, Australia. His particular area of interest is sound art and noise music made by artists.

== Directorships and curation ==
High Reflections was a monthly series of sound events started in 2009 and curated by Kelly and Alex White at Serial Space in Sydney, Australia. It ended in May 2011 with a mini festival at Red Rattler.

In April 2010 Kelly produced caleb.k presents for the ISSUE Project Room in New York City.

Until 2006 Caleb was one of the three directors of Pelt Gallery including Peter Blamey and William Noble. It was located in Chippendale, a semi-industrial inner city suburb of Sydney. The gallery specialized in exhibitions artwork for which sound was the primary medium or only media. During its period of operation, it was the venue for most of the impermanent audio events (also curated by Kelly).

Between 2001 and 2006 Caleb Kelly curated impermanent.audio; an independent sound event primarily concerned with the performance of new musics, focused listening, the still contemplation of abstract audio and the act of listening itself. By the time it ended in 2006 Kelly had produced over 100 events and festivals.

laudible was an early net radio station. Based in Sydney, it was part of the global XChange Network and Open Radio Archive Network Group (ORANG), which included Radio International Stadt (Germany), Radioqualia (New Zealand/Adelaide/Amsterdam), RIXC (Latvia) and irational.org (UK). laudible featured the sound works of many Australian and New Zealand artists and regularly re-broadcast local terrestrial stations via RealAudio. It ran until its parent server at orang.orang.de was compromised and erased.

Kelly was a guest producer at What Is Music in 2001 and co-producer in 2002 and 2004.

== Educator ==
Kelly is currently a researcher, lecturer and supervisor at the College of Fine Arts at the University of New South Wales in Sydney. He previously held positions at the University of Sydney, the University of Western Sydney and at Unitec in Auckland, New Zealand.

== Bibliography ==
- Tangible/Intangible: The Sound of Sculpture, Govett-Brewster Art Gallery, 2020
- Gallery Sound, Bloomsbury 2017
- Sound, (Ed) Whitechapel Gallery & MIT Press 2011
- Cracked Media: The Sound of Malfunction, MIT Press 2009
