= Caleb Young =

American conductor

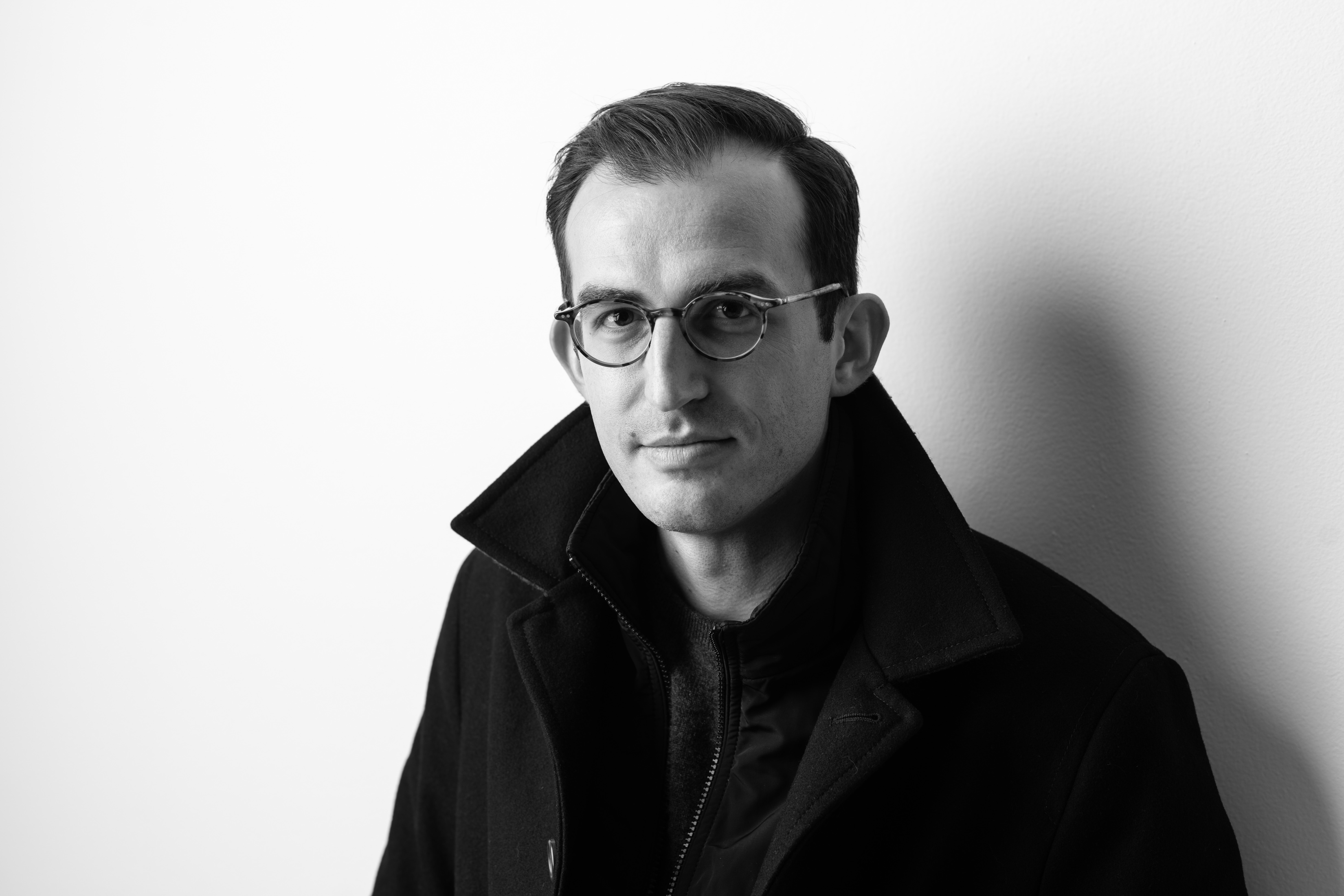
- Young in 2021
- Born: Asheville, North Carolina
- Education: University of Alabama; Jacobs School of Music
- Occupation: Conductor
- Website: www.calebwyoung.com

Caleb Young is an American conductor. He has conducted orchestras in Europe and North America, including the Los Angeles Philharmonic, Detroit Symphony Orchestra, Kansas City Symphony, Minnesota Orchestra, Oregon Symphony, St. Louis Symphony Orchestra, Helsinki Philharmonic Orchestra, Iceland Symphony Orchestra, Israel Philharmonic Orchestra, BBC Concert Orchestra, and The Hallé. He has worked with composer John Williams as an assistant on projects with the Los Angeles Philharmonic, Berlin Philharmonic, and Vienna Philharmonic, and has performed works by Williams at major international venues.

== Early life and education ==
Young was born in Asheville, North Carolina. From an early age he was interested in music and at the age of three, he was introduced to piano by his parents. During his time at high school, he played wind instruments. He studied euphonium at the University of Alabama and then later attended and graduated from the Jacobs School of Music at Indiana University with a master's degree in orchestral conducting in 2013. During his time at Indiana, he studied with conducting pedagogues, David Effron and Arthur Fagen.

== Career ==
His career started in 2013 in Bloomington, when he created an orchestra named KammerMahler. The orchestra specializes in performing symphonic works in a chamber orchestra setting.

Young joined the Fort Wayne Philharmonic as assistant conductor in 2016 and was promoted to associate conductor in 2018. During his tenure, he conducted more than 200 performances and contributed to audience-engagement programming, including the orchestra’s Music+Mixology series and Musically Speaking pre-concert talks. He was selected as "The Great Eight of 2018" for his contributions to Fort Wayne's arts community. He later received an Emerging Artist Award from Arts United of Greater Fort Wayne. In 2021, he was appointed to the newly created position of guest conductor for engagement after five years with the orchestra. The appointment marked the final phase of his work with the orchestra during his relocation to Europe.

Young has worked with composer John Williams as an assistant on projects with the Los Angeles Philharmonic, Berlin Philharmonic, and Vienna Philharmonic. In 2026, he conducted the Nordic premiere of Williams’s Viola Concerto with the Helsinki Philharmonic Orchestra, featuring Antoine Tamestit as soloist. The project was presented with Williams’s permission, and the performance received critical praise; critic Jari Kallio described it as “a European premiere performance of utmost musicality and admirable métier.”

In 2021, Young was invited by Finnish conductor Jukka-Pekka Saraste to join the inaugural roster of Lead! Artists as part of the LEAD! Foundation.

== Awards and recognition ==
- The Great Eight of 2018
- Mayor's Arts Award
- The Ansbacher Fellowship

== Personal life ==
Caleb Young currently resides in Berlin.
