= Caleb de Casper =

American queer singer and performing artist

Caleb De Casper
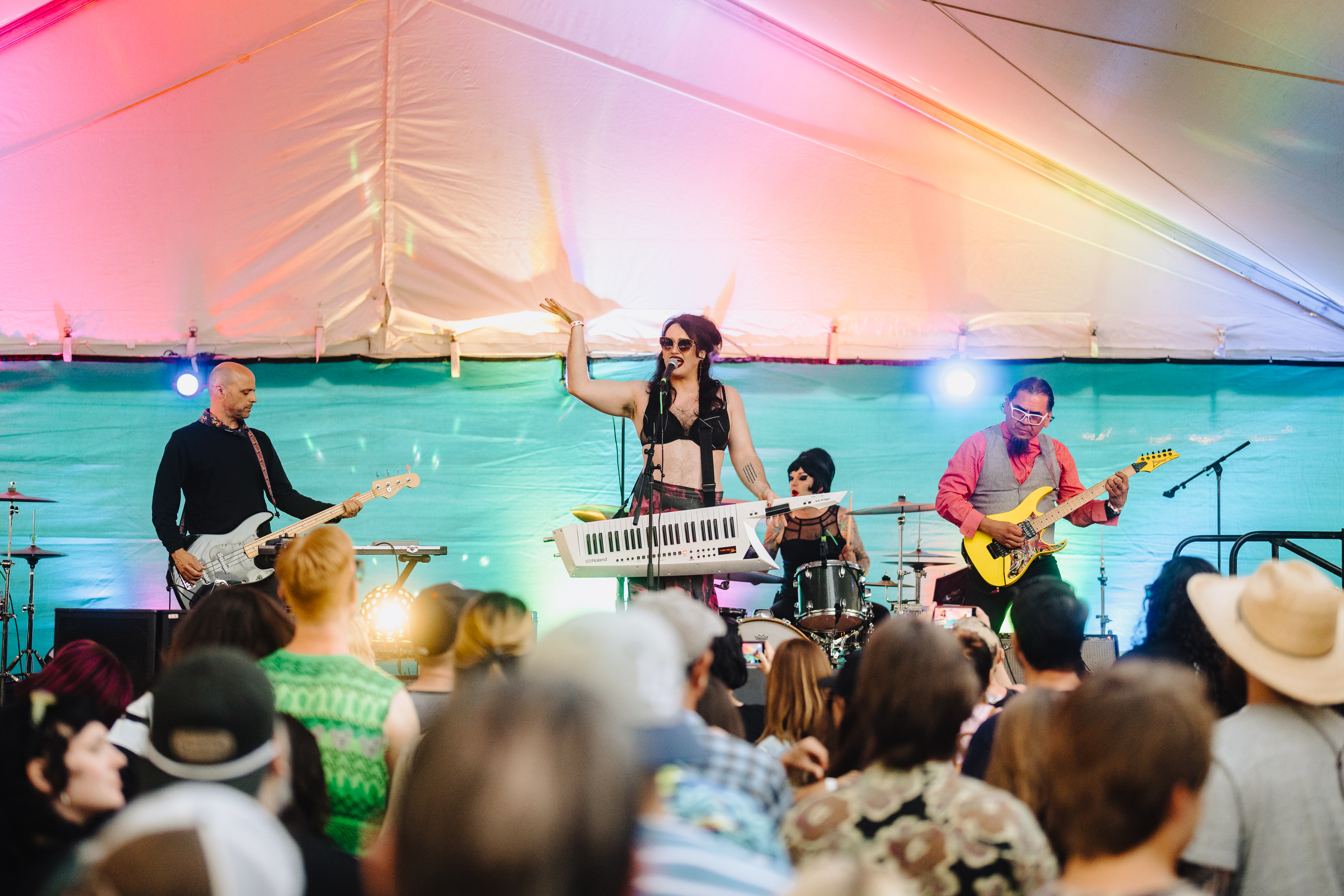
- Born: North Carolina, U.S.
- Occupations: Singer; songwriter; musician; producer
- Years active: 2014–present
- Musical career
- Genres: synth pop; dark synth pop; glam punk rock; horror cabaret
- Instrument: piano
- Label: Chicken Ranch Records
- Website: calebdecasper.com

Caleb De Casper is an American singer, songwriter, and performing artist. They (Note: De Casper uses he/him and they/them pronouns; this article uses they/them pronouns for consistency.) are known for their image as a queer icon and musical versatility, ranging from horror cabaret and glam rock to disco and dark synth pop. They have been named "Artist of the Month" by KUTX and have performed at SXSW, ACL Fest, and Utopia Fest, among others. De Casper is an advocate for LGBTQ rights as well opposing Texas legislators on their proposed "anti-trans" and "anti-drag" laws. In the 2023 Texas Legislative Session, Caleb De Casper used their platform as an artist to testify against these bills and advocate for freedom of expression and performer's rights.

== Life and career ==
=== 1993-2015: Early life and transition to music ===
Born in a rural community in North Carolina, Caleb De Casper faced significant prejudice from conservative society for their queer identity and expression; De Casper often felt that the surrounding community was not accepting of individuals who possessed effeminate or gay characteristics, as they did. A classically trained pianist and vocalist, De Casper attended musical school in North Carolina for several years before moving to Brooklyn, seeking out a more metropolitan lifestyle. After returning to Charlotte, North Carolina, De Casper often faced difficulty finding work: their ‘horror cabaret’ performances shocked and scared away audiences. However, their career began to progress when they moved to Austin, Texas.

=== 2022: “Femme Boy” ===
De Casper's varied debut LP, “Femme Boy,” was released in May 2022: it features a variety of musical styles and genres, from dance floor beats, the theatrical stage, and the glitz and ruin of old Hollywood. “Femme Boy” consists of 12 songs focusing on themes of desire, allure, and queer sexuality in a ribald and sensualized manner. The diversity of expression and unique presentation in this collection cements De Casper's perception in the public consciousness as a popular alternative diva. Collaborating with artists such as p1nkstar and Y2K, De Casper also delves into the ethos of queer identity and belonging to marginalized groups: their songs have the same message in the end—“outcasts will find themselves and their people.”

== Impact and legacy ==
De Casper's performances are renowned for their breathtaking, over-the-top theatricality and versatility. They are additionally known for dynamic and gender nonconforming style and appearance, breaking traditional binary gender norms and dressing in genderqueer and fluid costumes, such as fishnets, dresses, and high heels in order to express the diversity of masculinity and express queer visibility. Currently, De Casper continues to perform at shows, arts events and festivals such as ACL Fest, SXSW and Utopia Fest. In recognition for their contributions to the Austin queer community, the City of Austin proclaimed April 21, 2022 to be Caleb De Casper Day, with the honors being presented by Mayor Steve Adler, a month before the release of their debut album. In 2023, De Casper testified against Texas Senate Bill 12 (known as the “Drag Queen Bill”) at the Texas State Capitol.
