= Caleb Shang =

Chinese-Australian soldier

Caleb James Shang
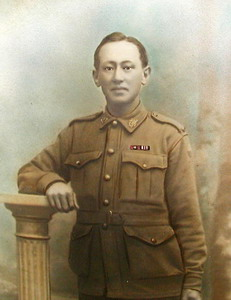
- C. J. Shang, c. September 1918; Cairns Historical Society
- Born: 4 August 1884; Brisbane, Queensland
- Died: 6 April 1953 (aged 68); Cairns, Queensland
- Burial place: Cairns Cemetery
- Relatives: Lee Wah Shang and Jane Shang (parents); Anna Shang (née Kassene; wife) b. 1900; d. 1955; Delta Shang (daughter); Maud Shang (sister)
- Military career
- Allegiance: Australia
- Branch: Australian Imperial Force; Volunteer Defence Corps
- Service years: 1916–1919; 1942–1945
- Rank: Private
- Nickname: Charlie
- Units: 47th Battalion; 45th Battalion; 48th Battalion; 17th Battalion, Volunteer Defence Corps
- Conflicts: First World War; Western Front; Battle of Bullecourt; Battle of Messines; Battle of Menin Road; Battle of Polygon Wood; Battle of Passchendaele; Defence of Amiens; Battle of Amiens; Second World War
- Awards: Distinguished Conduct Medal & Bar; Military Medal
- Other work: Clerk, herbalist, taxi driver, bookmaker

Caleb James Shang DCM & Bar, MM (born Duckbour Caleb James Shang; 4 August 1884 – 6 April 1953)^{[a]} was the most highly decorated Chinese Australian soldier who served in the First World War. He was decorated with the Distinguished Conduct Medal twice and received the Military Medal.^{[b]} He served with distinction on the Western Front, primarily as a scout and sniper, until his wounds rendered him unfit for further duties. After returning to Australia, Shang married in Victoria and moved to Queensland, where he and his wife raised their three children. During the Second World War, he served on home defence duties in northern Queensland.

== Early life ==
Shang was born on 4 August 1884 in Fortitude Valley, a suburb of Brisbane, Queensland. His father was Lee Wah Shang from Guangdong, China.^{[c]} His mother was Mary Jane Shang (née Noon) from Gayndah. He was the eldest of 13 children born into the family. The family moved to Cairns, and he left school at the age of 12.

Before the First World War began, Shang was working as a clerk. He enlisted in the Australian Imperial Force (AIF) on 5 June 1916, aged 31. His brother, Sidney Waugh Shang, had enlisted in January 1916, serving in the 12th Battalion.^{[c]} It was unusual for men of Asian ancestry to join Australia's armed forces at this time in history, since only those of European ancestry were considered eligible for such service.

== First World War ==
=== Distinguished Conduct Medal ===
Shang joined the 47th Battalion on 7 March 1917, in time for the battalion's action at Bullecourt, in Flanders, Belgium, in April 1917. Shang served in the 47th Battalion throughout the heavy fighting around Passchendaele in July–November 1917, including Menin Road, Polygon Wood, and Passchendaele Ridge. On 7 June 1917, Shang served with distinction at Messines Ridge. Shang observed the German preparations for a counter attack on the 47th Battalion's newly won positions, and managed to signal to the rear for artillery support to catch the Germans advancing in the open, all the while exposed to the enemy. The Australian Official Historian, Charles Bean recorded Shang's conduct in his notebook, writing:

(He) acted as a runner, signaller, scout, L[ewis] Gunner (after 10 weeks of self tuition in signalling). He found a signal lamp in the cement cottage at Hun's Walk, set up the lamp on top of it, exposed to everything, worked it there by daylight and dark (by daylight running messages). He went out on patrol after snipers & got through without a scratch. Every time he came to Bn HQ he carried some information, disc or paybook. Every time he went out he carried water, ammunition and sniped in the intervals. The CO roused on him with tongue in cheek, 'You don't appear to be doing much' he said. 'Oh well I'm a bit new to this' he said, 'it's only my second stunt'.

For his actions, Shang was subsequently recommended for the Distinguished Conduct Medal on 18 June 1917. In his recommendation, the commanding officer of the 47th Battalion, Lieutenant Colonel A. P. Imlay, wrote:

This soldier displayed a contempt for danger and exhibited wonderful endurance and coolness resource and initiative and his conduct certainly inspired everybody he came in contact with ... His conduct throughout excited the admiration of officers and men.<

Shang received the DCM on 6 July 1917, with the citation reading:

For conspicuous gallantry and devotion to duty on numerous occasions. He acted as runner continuously for four days through barrages and fire swept areas, carrying water, food and ammunition to the front line. He attacked enemy snipers in broad daylight and accounted for them. In addition to this, he constantly volunteered for dangerous patrols into enemy country, where he gained valuable information as a scout, and also showed remarkable skill in improvising lamp signals in a very dangerous position whence he could send information to Battalion Headquarters. His conduct showed a never-failing example of fearlessness, resource and initiative.

=== Bar to Distinguished Conduct Medal ===
In March–April 1918, Shang fought around Dernancourt on the Somme, France, where the 47th Battalion was engaged in the defence of Amiens. In the path of the "heaviest attack ever faced by Australians in this or any war," the 12th Australian Brigade and 13th Australian Brigade faced two and a half divisions of German troops and suffered 1,230 casualties. Despite these losses, the fierce resistance of the 4th Australian Division at Dernancourt and the 3rd Australian Division at Villers-Bretonneux effectively halted the German spring offensive. For his actions around Dernancourt, Shang was recommended for a Bar to his DCM on 8 April 1918.^{[b]} In his recommendation, the commander of the 12th Australian Brigade, Brigadier General John Gellibrand, wrote:

For conspicuous gallantry and devotion to duty at DERNAECOURT [sic]^{[d]} on April 5th 1918 and previous occasions. This soldier's example has always been a source of pride in this Battalion, but on this occasion, he excelled himself by his wonderful powers of endurance, intrepidity and utter contempt for danger. He volunteered for an O.P. in an advanced position at the start of operations and maintained it throughout until attack started when he reaped a harvest with his rifles until his post was blown right out. He came back through enemy fire to get more rifles but was employed as runner and made several trips through enemy barrage which was intense. He continued carrying ammunition and running until company moved out when he volunteered to remain behind and cover retirement with a Lewis Gun which he did successfully. He showed an utter disregard for danger and is a gallant soldier.

Shang was awarded a Bar to the DCM on 25 August 1918, with the citation reading:

For conspicuous gallantry and devotion to duty. He volunteered for an O.P. at start of operations, and reaped a harvest with his rifle till his post was blown up. He then made several trips as runner through the enemy's barrage, and continued to carry ammunition until the withdrawal, which he covered with a Lewis gun.

=== Military Medal ===
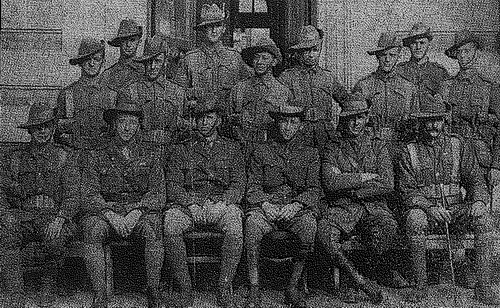
'Heroes of the 47th Battalion' at the time of the unit's disbandment, c. May 1918; Shang is at the centre, standing

In further fighting around Amiens at Villers-Bretonneux on 1 May 1918, Shang was recommended for the Military Medal, which was awarded on 13 September 1918. In his recommendation, the commander of the 12th Australian Brigade, Colonel Raymond Leane, wrote:

At VILLERS BRETONNEUX on 1 May 1918, he displayed remarkable bravery and initiative in making a daylight reconnaissance of the Sector under heavy Machine Gun fire and snipers' activities and which proved of considerable value to us. He established an O.P. at which he was continually sniped at and succeeded in conveying back valuable information of enemy movement and directed our artillery fire on to the enemy formations causing them many casualties. He maintained this Post during tour in line without relief.

The 47th Battalion was disbanded on 31 May 1918 due to severe casualties, a lack of reinforcements from Australia, and command and disciplinary problems. The survivors of the battalion were transferred to other units, and Shang was posted to the 45th Battalion.^{[e]} He also served for a fortnight with the 48th Battalion in June 1918.

Shang served in the 45th Battalion at the Battle of Amiens during the Hundred Days Offensive which began on 8 August 1918. He was wounded in action on 16 August 1918 and evacuated to the United Kingdom. The war ended while Shang was convalescing in the UK, and he was returned to Australia on 10 December 1918. He was discharged from the AIF on 9 April 1919, and returned home as one of the most decorated Australian soldiers of the war. Described as 'the greatest of Cairns soldiers', he received a hero's welcome upon his arrival at Cairns, and was greeted by the Mayor of Cairns, the 'Returned Soldier's League' and an estimated three thousand people at the wharf. In March 1919, the Cairns Post newspaper raised a public subscription fund in order to provide Shang with a start in civilian life. Over £45 was collected over a period of one week from both the European and Chinese communities of Cairns.

== Interwar period ==
Shang resumed civilian life working as a herbalist in Victoria during the interwar years. He married Anna Louise Kassene on 28 April 1923 in Hamilton, Victoria. The couple then moved to Queensland, where Shang worked as a clerk, taxi driver, and bookmaker, mostly in the Cairns area.^{[f]} He and his wife had a son and two daughters.

According to Shang's sister, Alma Fang Yuen, he never talked about the war. Through the early 1930s, Shang was frequently in hospital. From the mid-1930s, he continued to suffer from poor health. In 1934, he was granted a 100% war service pension. Shang was an active member of the Cairns sub-branch of the Returned Sailors and Soldiers Imperial League of Australia.

== Second World War ==
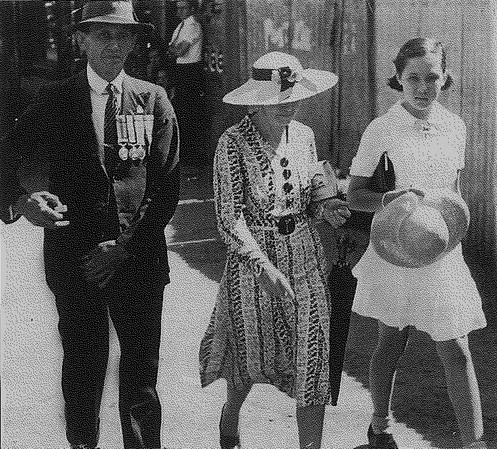
Caleb, Anna, and Delta Shang on Anzac Day in Cairns, 1943

During the Second World War, Shang enlisted in the 17th Battalion, Volunteer Defence Corps (VDC) in Cairns on 21 April 1942, aged 57. The VDC was a part time volunteer force modelled on the British Home Guard, consisting of World War I veterans, men in reserved occupations and men aged 16–18, too young to enlist in the armed forces. The role of the VDC was to conduct guerilla warfare, collect intelligence and provide static defence in the event of a Japanese invasion. As the threat of an invasion of Australia diminished, Shang was placed on reserve on 18 December 1944. He was discharged on 21 October 1945, following the disbandment of the Corps.

In the 1940s, few were aware of Shang's distinguished AIF war record and continuing VDC service. Consequently, he suffered the occasional racial slur as a result of the heightened anti-Asian sentiment during the war. Shang marched in the ANZAC Day parade, complete with decorations, in April 1943. Despite many years of active membership with the Returned Sailors and Soldiers Imperial League, this was the only ANZAC Day parade that he ever marched in. Shang's daughter, Delta Shang, stated that her normally modest father participated in the march largely as a response to the racism felt during World War II.

== Death and legacy ==
Due to a chronic chest complaint, Shang died on 6 April 1953 in Cairns, and was buried in the Methodist section of the town cemetery. He was survived by his wife and children. His photograph and medals hang on display in the Cairns Regional Gallery. Shang Street in Mooroobool, a suburb of Cairns, is named after him.

== Honours and awards ==

| Distinguished Conduct Medal & Bar | Awarded 6 July 1917; Awarded 25 August 1918 |
| Military Medal | Awarded 13 September 1918 |
| British War Medal 1914–1920 | Issued January 1922 |
| Victory Medal | Issued January 1922 |
| Australia Service Medal 1939–1945 | Eligible 1949^{[g]} |

== See also ==
- Billy Sing
- Jack Wong Sue
- White Australia policy

== Notes ==
a. Shang was also known as Charlie Shang, and by the Chinese name Lee Duckbour.

b. There is some evidence that Shang may have been recommended for the Victoria Cross. On 4 May 1918, Shang's commanding officer, Lieutenant Colonel A. P. Imlay, noted in the 47th Battalion War Diary:

Several recommendations for immediate award were forwarded particularly 3018 Burton A.W. scout and 1779 Sgt WE Brown DCM* + 3204 Pte CJ Shang DCM*. These 2 men have a habit of performing gallant deeds as a matter of course, both are quite fearless and BROWN in the opinion of the Battn should have the V.C. SHANG had already been recommended for it, but to write the story to convince those who decide these awards is too difficult for me to accomplish apparently.

Although Imlay claimed in the War Diary that Shang had been recommended for the Victoria Cross, Craig Deayton notes that no records of the recommendations exist. If Imlay's note in the Battalion War Diary is assumed to be correct, then it is possible that the recommendation for the Victoria Cross refers to the Dernacourt action on 5 April 1918, since 4 May 1918 entry in the War Diary ("SHANG had already been recommended for it") is written in the context of Shang's recommendation for the Military Medal for action at Villers-Bretonneux on 1 May 1918.

c. This is a Chinese name; the family name is Lee. Lee Wah-shang's family name was Anglicised to become 'Shang.' The arbitrary nature of the Anglicisation of Chinese names can be seen in Sidney Waugh Shang's attestation papers. S. W. Shang enlisted under the surname 'Waughshang,' with the Next of Kin given as "Mother, Mrs Jane Waughshang." Successive administrative corrections were made to this document from 'Waughshang' to 'Waugh,' and finally to 'Shang'. In contrast, C. Shang gave only the surname 'Shang.'

d. There is also a handwritten note at this point in the record.

e. A measure of the pride and loyalty felt by AIF men to their battalions (and their unique regimental identities) can be gauged in a letter from the Imperial War Graves Commission, ANZAC Agency, to AIF Base Records in November 1953. This correspondence, written after Shang's death, sought clarification of Shang's unit for his grave monument inscription. On the IWGC verification form for his grave inscription, Shang's next of kin crossed out his nominal unit at time of discharge (45th Battalion) and substituted 47th Battalion in its place. The majority of Shang's service was with 47th Battalion, and it was during this service that he was awarded all of his decorations.

f. According to David Day, it was alleged that Shang and his brothers were involved in opium smuggling and bribed customs officers in doing so.

g. Shang's VDC service records do not note an issue of the Australia Service Medal 1939–1945, as the file was closed at the time of discharge in 1945. The campaign medal was instituted in 1949 and eligibility was revised in 1996. National Archives of Australia service records indicate that Australian World War II campaign medals were typically issued in the early 1950s—around the time of Shang's death. Shang's VDC service records do not indicate an issue to either himself or his next of kin, although they do indicate his eligibility for this campaign medal.
