= Caleb Aperahama =

New Zealand rugby union player

- Born: 11 July 1996 (age 30) New Zealand
- Height: 196 cm (6 ft 5 in)
- Weight: 121 kg (267 lb; 19 st 1 lb)

Rugby union career
- Position: Lock
Senior career
Years	Team	Apps	(Points)
2020	Canterbury	1	(0)
2021–	Southland	1	(0)
- Correct as of 25 August 2021

Caleb Aperahama (born 11 July 1996 in New Zealand) is a New Zealand rugby union player who plays for Southland in the National Provincial Championship. His playing position is lock.
