= Caleb Johnson (disambiguation) =

Caleb Johnson (born 1991) is an American singer.

Caleb Johnson or Kaleb Johnson may also refer to:

- Caleb Johnson (baseball) (1844–1925), American baseball player
- Caleb Johnson (linebacker, born July 14, 1998), American football player
- Caleb Johnson (linebacker, born July 28, 1998), American football player
- Kaleb Johnson (offensive lineman) (born 1993), American football guard
- Kaleb Johnson (running back) (born 2003), American football running back
