= Caleb Evans (geologist) =

English geologist (1831–1886)

Caleb Evans (25 July 1831 – 16 September 1886), was an English geologist.

== Family life ==
Evans, born on 25 July 1831, was educated under Professor Key at University College School. The death of his father compelled him to leave school at an early age, and in 1846 he began work in a solicitor's office. In 1852 Evans was appointed a clerk in the chancery pay office, a post he held until 1882, when his health enforced his retirement. He never married; his residence was at Hampstead, where he lived with his brother and sisters. Evans commenced the study of geology by attending lectures delivered in 1855 by Professor Owen and Dr. Melville. In 1858 he began to collect fossils from the tertiary formations of the south of England, and formed during the next twenty-five years very complete sets illustrating the strata of the London district. He also investigated the strata of the Isle of Wight, Lyme Regis, Weymouth, Swanage, and Portsmouth.

== Career ==
In 1857 Evans took part in founding the Geologists' Association of London, of which he was for many years one of the most active members. In 1867 he was elected a fellow of the Geological Society. He was fortunate in being able to take advantage of the operations in connection with the main drainage works in the south of London, which afforded opportunities for collecting fossils never likely to recur. He secured suites of specimens of fossil shells of great interest and rarity. Evans also did excellent work in studying the chalk. He made large collections of its fossils. In the 1870s Evans would take geologists on tours of the outcrops of Hampstead Heath; these tours would conclude with a visit to Evans’ home to view his collection of ‘Highgate Fauna’ fossils.

His paper 'On some Sections of Chalk between Croydon and Oxted,’ read to the Geologists' Association in January 1870, marks the first English attempt to divide this immensely thick mass of pure white limestone into several zones, and to correlate these zones with those that continental geologists had already established.

Altogether Evans was the author of eleven papers on geological subjects, eight of which appeared in the 'Proceedings' of the Geologists' Association, including the paper on the chalk mentioned above, along with "Geology of the neighbourhood of Portsmouth and Ryde". His other work included sketch of the geology of Faringdon in the 'Geologist' for August 1866, and 'Mill Hill in former Ages,’ written for the Mill Hill Magazine. Many of Evans's papers were also published separately.

Evans constructed several geological models or relief maps, his method being to paste layer upon layer of cartridge paper so as to secure the necessary elevations, and then to colour the whole according to the outcrop of the rocks. His models of the valley of the Thames near London, of a part of the same on a larger scale, and one of the whole of England, were passed to H. J. Lister of Eldon Road, Hampstead after Evans' death; a map or model of the country round Hastings is in the possession of the corporation of that town; he also constructed a model of the neighbourhood of Sidmouth. Evans's extensive collections of fossils were purchased by Mr. Ernest Westlake of Fordingbridge.

Evans died on 16 September 1886.
