= Caleb Williams (basketball) =

American basketball player

Auburn Tigers
- Position: Shooting guard
- League: Southeastern Conference

Personal information
- Listed height: 6 ft 5 in (1.96 m)
- Listed weight: 195 lb (88 kg)

Career information
- High school: SFA Academy (Tampa, Florida)
- College: Auburn (commit)

Caleb Williams is an American basketball player for the Auburn Tigers of the Southeastern Conference (SEC).

== Early life ==
Williams is from Wichita, Kansas, but played for SFA Academy in Tampa, Florida in high school. He was rated as a four-star recruit by 247Sports and was ranked as the number 138 player in the class of 2026. On3.com ranked him as a top-120 recruit in the nation.

== College career ==
Williams committed to Auburn on October 24, 2025, becoming the first signing of Auburn's 2026 class.
