= Morgan Evans discography =

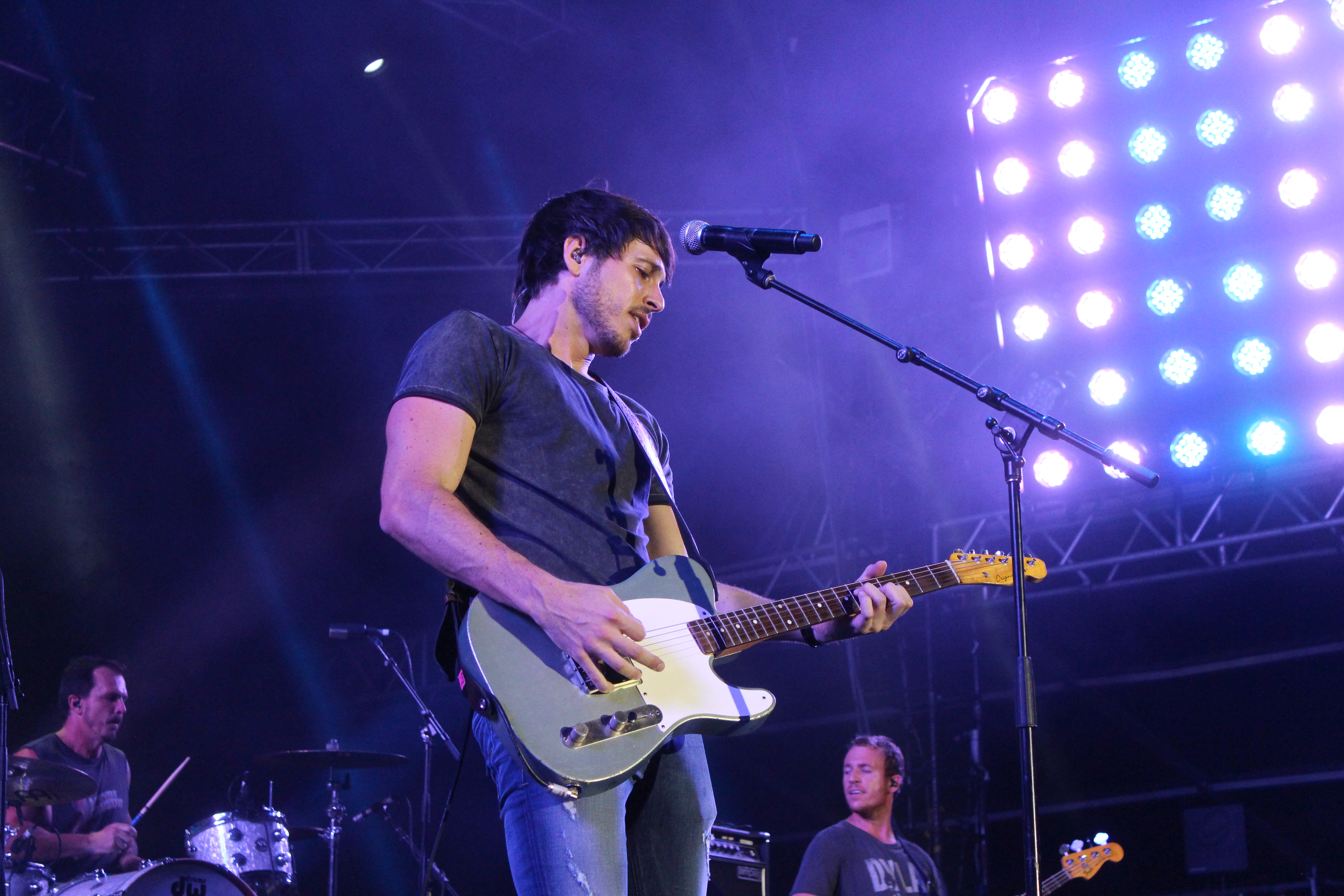
- Morgan Evans CMC Rocks 2016
- Studio albums: 3
- EPs: 5
- Live albums: 1
- Singles: 27
- Music videos: 25

Australian country music singer Morgan Evans has released 3 studio albums, 1 live album and 5 extended plays.

== Albums ==
=== Studio albums ===
Title	Details	Peak chart positions			
Title	Details	AUS	AUS Country	US	US Country
Morgan Evans	Released: 14 March 2014; Label: Warner Australasia	20	1	—	—
Things That We Drink To	Released: 12 October 2018; Label: Warner Music Nashville	5	1	106	9
Steel Town	Released: 20 March 2026; Label: Virgin Music	17	3	—	—

=== Live albums ===
Title	Album details	Peak chart positions
Title	Album details	AUS
Live at the Sydney Opera House	Released: 12 April 2024; Label: Warner Australasia; Format: CD, digital download	35

== Extended plays ==
Title	EP details
Live Each Day	Released: 20 January 2012; Label: Warner Australasia; Format: CD, digital download
While We're Young	Released: 24 August 2012; Label: Warner Australasia; Format: CD, digital download
Morgan Evans EP	Released: 10 August 2018; Label: Warner Bros. Nashville; Format: Digital download, streaming
The Country and the Coast (Side A)	Released: 29 October 2021; Label: Warner Bros. Nashville; Format: CD, Digital download, streaming
Life Upside Down	Released: 21 April 2023; Label: Warner Bros. Nashville; Format: Digital download, streaming

== Singles ==
Title	Year	Peak chart positions						Certifications	Album
Title	Year	AUS	CAN Country	NZ Hot	US	US Country	US Country Airplay	Certifications	Album
"Big Skies"	2007	— (Note: "Big Skies"did not enter the ARIA Top 100 Singles Chart, but peaked at number 28 on the physical sales.)	—	—	—	—	—		Live Each Day
"Live Each Day"	2012	—	—	—	—	—	—		Live Each Day
"Carry On"	2013	—	—	—	—	—	—		While We're Young
"One Eye for an Eye"	2014	—	—	—	—	—	—		Morgan Evans
"Long Live the Newcastle Knights"	2014	—	—	—	—	—	—		Non-album single
"Like a Tornado"	2014	—	—	—	—	—	—		Morgan Evans
"Kiss Somebody"	2017	53	20	—	53	11	3	ARIA: Platinum; MC: Gold; RIAA: Platinum; RMNZ: Gold	Things That We Drink To
"I Do"	2017	72	—	—	—	—	—	ARIA: Gold	Things That We Drink To
"Day Drunk"	2018	27	32	—	—	29	21	ARIA: 2× Platinum; MC: Gold; RMNZ: Gold	Things That We Drink To
"Young Again"	2019	77	—	—	—	—	—		Things That We Drink To
"Diamonds"	2019	94	—	10	—	—	52		Non-album singles
"All I Want for Christmas Is You"	2020	—	—	—	—	—	51		Non-album singles
"Love Is Real"	2021	—	—	—	—	—	50		The Country and the Coast (Side A)
"Country Outta My Girl" (solo or featuring Rivers Cuomo)	2021	—	—	—	—	—	—		The Country and the Coast (Side A)
"Sing Along Drink Along"	2021	—	—	—	—	—	—		The Country and the Coast (Side A)
"Christmas in the Sun"	2021	—	—	—	—	—	—		Non-album single
"Over for You"	2022	—	—	—	—	42	42		Life Upside Down
"On My Own Again"	2023	—	—	39	—	—	—		Life Upside Down
"Date Night" (Kita Alexander featuring Morgan Evans)	2023	—	—	32	—	—	—		Young in Love
"Thank God She's a Country Girl"	2023	—	—	—	—	—	—		TBA
"Christmas in the Backyard"	2023	—	—	—	—	—	—		TBA
"Beer Back Home"	2025	—	—	—	—	—	—		Steel Town
"How to Make Gravy"	2025	—	—	—	—	—	—		Non-album single
"Two Broken Hearts" (with Laci Kaye Booth)	2026	—	—	—	—	—	—		Steel Town
"Steel Town"	2026	—	—	—	—	—	—		Steel Town
"Letting You Go"	2026	—	—	—	—	—	—		Steel Town
"Ain't Goin' Down ('Til the Sun Comes Up)"	2026	—	—	—	—	—	—		Steel Town (deluxe)
"—" denotes releases that did not chart or were not released.

=== Other charted songs ===
Title	Year	Peak chart positions	Album
Title	Year	US Country	Album
"Things That We Drink To"	2018	46	Things That We Drink To

== Music videos ==
Year	Video	Director
2007	"Big Skies"	Myles Conti
2012	"Live Each Day"	
2013	"Carry On"	
2013	"While We're Young"	
2014	"One Eye for An Eye"	
2014	"Like a Tornado"	
2015	"Best I Never Had"	
2017	"Kiss Somebody"	
2018	"Day Drunk" (vacation diary)	
2018	"American"	
2019	"Young Again"	
2019	"Day Drunk"	Colin Duffy
2019	"Diamonds"	
2020	"Diamonds" (Live)	Peter John
2021	"Love Is Real"	Peter John
2021	"Christmas in the Sun"	Chris Beyrooty
2022	"Over for You" (Live in Melbourne)	Peter John
2022	"Over for You"	Peter John
2023	"On My Own Again"	Peter John
2023	"Date Night" (with Kita Alexander)	Peter John
2024	"On My Own Again" (Live at the Sydney Opera House)	Peter John
2024	"Rip Rip Woodchip" [feat. John Williamson] (Live at the Sydney Opera House)	Peter John
2024	"All Right Here"	Peter John
2024	"Say What You Want" (Live at the Sydney Opera House)	Peter John
2025	"Beer Back Home"	Peter John
2026	"Steel Town"	
