= Morgan Evans =

Morgan Evans may refer to:

- Cowboy Morgan Evans (1903–1969), American rodeo performer
- John M. Evans (Montana politician) (1863–1946), American politician
- Morgan "Bill" Evans (1910–2002), American landscape designer
- Morgan Evans (rugby league) (born 1992), Welsh rugby league player
- John Morgan Evans (1942–1991), American actor, playwright
- Morgan Evans (singer), Australian country singer
  - Morgan Evans (album), 2014
  - Morgan Evans (EP), 2018
- Morgan Evans (screenwriter), American writer, director, producer
