= Young Again =

Young Again may refer to:

- "Young Again" (Hardwell song), a 2014 song by Dutch DJ Hardwell
- "Young Again" (Morgan Evans song), a 2019 song by Australian singer Morgan Evans
