= Live at the Sydney Opera House (Morgan Evans album) =

Live album by Morgan Evans
- Released: 12 April 2024
- Recorded: September 2023
- Venue: Sydney Opera House
- Length: 63:32
- Labels: Warner Music Nashville; Warner Australasia

Morgan Evans chronology
| Life Upside Down (2023) | Live at the Sydney Opera House (2024) | Steel Town (2025) |

Live at the Sydney Opera House is the first live album by Australian country music singer-songwriter Morgan Evans. It was released on 12 April 2024. The album was teased in early January 2024 with Evans saying that he was "signing off on the final mixes". The album was announced on 22 February 2024.

Upon announcement Evans said "It was an absolute honour, and a joy, to play the shows at the Sydney Opera House. Playing that place is probably a momentous occasion for anyone, but for an Aussie, it's the one."

The album was released on limited-edition vinyl release on 3 October 2025, which saw the album peak at 35 on the ARIA chart.

== Track listing ==
1. "Young Again" – 5:00
2. "Country Outta My Girl" – 4:04
3. "Kiss Somebody" – 5:14
4. "Waltzing Matilda" (Interlude) – 0:57
5. "Love Is Real" – 5:01
6. "I Can't Make You Love Me" (Interlude) – 1:07
7. "Over for You" – 4:11
8. "Say What You Want" – 4:02
9. "Date Night" (featuring Kita Alexander) – 4:23
10. "Rip Rip Woodchip" (featuring John Williamson) – 2:27
11. "Dedications" (Interlude) – 2:27
12. "Things That We Drink To" – 4:46
13. "Pete and Brownie Go to Town" (Interlude) – 2:39
14. "Hey Little Mama" – 4:03
15. "Day Drunk" – 6:23
16. "I Still Call Australia Home" (Interlude) – 2:03
17. "On My Own Again" – 4:45

== Charts ==
Chart performance for Live at the Sydney Opera House
| Chart (2024–2025) | Peak position |
|---|---|
| Australian Albums (ARIA) | 35 |
