= Steel Town (album) =

Studio album by Morgan Evans
- Released: 20 March 2026
- Studios: Nashville, Tennessee
- Genre: Country
- Label: Virgin Music Group
- Producers: Morgan Evans; Todd Clark; Chris DeStefano; Lindsay Rimes

Morgan Evans chronology
Live at the Sydney Opera House (2024)	Steel Town (2026)

Singles from Steel Town
- 1. "Beer Back Home" Released: 10 October 2025; 2. "Two Broken Hearts" Released: 16 January 2026; 3. "Steel Town" Released: 13 February 2026; 4. "Letting You Go" Released: 10 April 2026

Singles from Steel Town (Deluxe)
- 1. "Ain't Goin’ Down ('Til the Sun Comes Up)"" Released: 2 October 2026

Steel Town is the third studio by Australian country music singer-songwriter Morgan Evans. The album was announced on 10 October 2025 alongside lead single "Beer Back Home"

The album was inspired by the previous two years Evans spent in Newcastle, New South Wales, a place he spent much of his childhood, and a city colloquially known as steel town due to the Newcastle Steelworks.

Upon announcement, Evans said, "I had to get outta this town, I needed something real. Old mates, familiar places and salt water. I decided to reconnect with where I came from, who I was, who I wanna be. This record is a journey… and it all started with a beer back home." The album artwork was shot in New Orleans, by Nick Swift.

The album will be the first released by Virgin Music Group with which he signed in September 2025. On 14 February 2026, Evans played at the Howlin' Country music festival in Newcastle.

In February 2026, Morgan announced the album will be supported with the Steel Town Tour across Australia and New Zealand in April through June 2026.

A deluxe edition the album was released on 25 September 2026, featuring four new songs.

At the 2026 ARIA Music Awards it was nominated for Best Country Album. At the 2027 Country Music Awards, it was nominated for Contemporary Country Album of the Year and Album of the Year.

== Critical reception ==
Nicole Piering from Country Swag called it a "sonically-rich collection that doubles as both a celebration of life and a reclamation of freedom for an artist who has weathered intense public scrutiny. Throughout its eleven tracks, Evans sounds like a weight has been lifted from him, truly free for the first time."

Laura McNamara from Rolling Stone Australia said "Stripping things back and speaking plainly is a key theme of Steel Town, with Evans leaning into lived-in experiences and more grounded storytelling. It's an exercise in accepting things the way they are – like relationships, identity, or starting over." McNamara called it "his most personal work to date."

== Track listing ==
Steel Town track listing
No.	Title	Writer(s)	Producer(s)	Length
1.	"Steel Town"	Morgan Evans; Sam Ellis; Ava Suppelsa	Evans; Chris DeStefano^{[v]}	3:19
2.	"Beer Back Home"	Evans; KK Johnston; Cole Miracle	Evans; Todd Clark	3:16
3.	"Two Broken Hearts" (featuring Laci Kaye Booth)	Evans; Fraser Churchill	Evans; DeStefano	3:53
4.	"Another Drink Coming"	Evans; Matt Roy; Geoff Warburton; Daniel Ross	Evans; Clark; DeStefano^{[v]}	3:31
5.	"Back to Country" (featuring William Barton)	Evans; William Barton	Evans	0:48
6.	"Land I Love"	Evans; Lindsay Rimes; Danielle Blakey	Evans; Rimes	4:03
7.	"Forgiving You for Me"	Evans	Evans; DeStefano	2:52
8.	"Letting You Go"	Evans; Rimes	Evans; Rimes	3:02
9.	"She Talks About Texas"	Evans	Evans; Clark; DeStefano^{[v]}	3:07
10.	"The Farm"	Evans; Jon Green; Scooter Carusoe	Evans; Clark; DeStefano^{[v]}	2:57
11.	"Settle It Down"	Evans; Ellis	Evans; Clark; DeStefano^{[v]}	3:20
Total length:				34:08

Steel Town (Deluxe) track listing
No.	Title	Writer(s)	Producer(s)	Length
12.	"Ain't Goin' Down ('Til the Sun Comes Up)"	Garth Brooks; Kent Blazy; Kim Williams	Evans; Rimes	4:16
13.	"Forgiving You" (with Jacob Raagaard)	Evans; Reid Isbell; Ben Simonetti	Evans; Jacob Raagaard; DeStefano	2:56
14.	"Song for Mum"	Evans	Evans; Rimes	2:45
15.	"Steel Town" (Knights version)	Evans; Ellis; Suppelsa	Evans; Clark	3:22

=== Note ===
- ^{^[v]} indicates a vocal producer

== Personnel ==
Credits adapted from Tidal.

- Ryan Hewitt – mixing (1, 2, 4)
- Sean Moffitt – mixing (3, 5–11)
- Ted Jensen – mastering (1, 4)
- Sam Moses – mastering (2, 3, 5–11)

== Charts ==
Chart performance for Steel Town
Chart (2026)	Peak position
Australian Albums (ARIA)	17
Australian Country Albums (ARIA)	3
