= Something About Love =

Something About Love may refer to:

- Something 'Bout Love, a song by David Archuleta,
- Something About Love (film), a Canadian drama film released in 1988.
