= Christmas from the Heart (David Archuleta album) =

Studio album by David Archuleta
- Released: October 13, 2009
- Recorded: June–September 2009
- Studio: Studio E, Chalice Recording Studios (Los Angeles), Smecky Music Studios (Prague), Rotosonic Sound (Prague), Counterpoint Studios (Salt Lake City), Black Apple Studios (Minneapolis), Tritone Studios (Salt Like City)
- Genre: Christmas; pop
- Length: 56:32
- Label: Jive; 19
- Producer: Kurt Bestor, Sam Cardon, Jeff Archuleta, Emanuel Kiriakou, John Lee Hancock, Richard Parkinson

David Archuleta chronology
David Archuleta (2008)	Christmas from the Heart (2009)	The Other Side of Down (2010)

Singles from Christmas from the Heart
- 1. "Have Yourself a Merry Little Christmas" Released: December 7, 2009

Christmas from the Heart is the second studio album and first Christmas album by American singer David Archuleta. It was released on October 13, 2009, via Jive Records and 19 Recordings Recorded despite initial opposition from the label, which considered it a poor fit for his image and marketing strategy, the album consists of 13 tracks, featuring eleven cover versions of Christmas standards and carols and the original song "Melodies of Christmas", which was co-written and produced by Archuleta.

Critics gave Christmas from the Heart generally positive reviews, praising David Archuleta's vocal talent and comfort with classic holiday songs, though some noted the album offered few surprises beyond traditional arrangements. The album debuted at number 30 on the US Billboard 200, reached number two on the Top Holiday Albums chart, and had sold 246,000 copies in the United States by January 2011. Lead single "Have Yourself a Merry Little Christmas," release on December 7, 2009, peaked at number 29 on Billboard's US Adult Contemporary chart.

== Background ==
In June 2008, after he finished as the runner-up on the seventh season of American Idol, Archuleta signed with Jive Records and 19 Recordings. After being signed, executives sought to market him as a "white Chris Brown," encouraging a more urban, edgy, and contemporary image to achieve commercial success. While Archuleta appreciated the label's efforts, which helped him become more competitive and produced pop-oriented songs like "Crush," he maintained that his true motivation as an artist was his love of music and its emotional resonance, rather than adhering to industry trends. His self-titled debut, which struck a balance between his personal style and the label's guidance, went on to sell 762,000 copies domestically, with lead single "Crush" peaking at number two on the US Billboard Hot 100.

For his next project, Archuleta's father, Jeff Archuleta, played a key role in advocating to Jive and 19 Recordings for the production of a Christmas album, despite the label's opposition. The label reportedly considered a Christmas album a waste of time, arguing that it would neither enhance his edgy image nor support their marketing strategy. The resulting album features traditional holiday songs such as "Angels We Have Heard on High" and "Ave Maria,” produced and arranged by Kurt Bestor, who also co-produced "Pat-a-pan" with John Hancock. Archuleta worked with Sam Cardon and Richard Parkinson on "What Child Is This?," "O Holy Night," and "Silent Night," and the album includes contributions from Utah musicians, including guitarists Rich Dixon and Michael Dowdle, harpist Lisa Rytting, and vocalists Jenny Frogley and David Osmond. Archuleta later described the album as "pretty reverent – more of a sacred, just chill Christmas album."

== Promotion ==
David Archuleta promoted the album on his Christmas from the Heart Tour. He performed several songs from the album in several shows, such as "Silent Night" at the Kaleidoscope Thanksgiving Special on November 26, 2009, "Melodies of Christmas" on Live with Regis and Kelly, "Pat-a-Pan" on Larry King Live, "Angels We Have Heard on High" on Fox & Friends and The Today Show, and "Ave Maria on Nuestra Navidad, a special on Univision, a Hispanic network.

== Critical reception ==
Professional ratings
Review scores
Source	Rating
AllMusic	3/5 stars
Billboard	3.5/5 stars

AllMusic editor Stephen Thomas Erlewine rated the album three ouf of five stars. He found that Archuleta "was born to slickly sing sentimental standards, which is all he does here. Apart from one song sung in Spanish and "Ava Maria," in Latin, there are no surprises here either in song selection or execution, but Archuleta is comfortable in such a familiar setting, singing in a friendly, eager-to-please fashion that will win him no new fans but will surely please all the old ones." Similarly, Billboard's Kelsey Paine wrote that Christmas from the Heart "puts the singer's mellifluous voice front and center and wins over the listener with his original renditions of classic holiday music [...] Archuleta's vocal virtuosity gives Christmas From the Heart a timelessness that should appeal to his fans and lovers of the traditional."

Associated Press remarked that "Archuleta may be a teenager, but he's well suited for classic holiday songs like "Silent Night" and "Ave Maria." The former American Idol runner-up sings those songs and more on his new holiday CD Christmas from the Heart. He's got a powerful, soulful voice that's beyond his years." Jon Bream, writing for The Sun Journal felt that Archuleta "applies his breathy choirboy tenor to arrangements of holiday fare we all learned in choir and throws in an original, the cliched "Melodies of Christmas," for good measure. Can't decide whether to label this bland or sleepy — or both." Teen Ink concluded: "Christmas from the Heart is the perfect way to celebrate the holiday season. It's a great gift for music lovers of any age. Archuleta's new CD will have you ready to rock around the Christmas tree and sing along with this new spin on traditional holiday music."

== Commercial performance ==
Christmas from the Heart debuted and peaked at number 30 on the US Billboard 200 with first week sales of 16,700 units. It also peaked at number two on Billboard's Top Holiday Albums chart. By January 2011, the album had sold 246,000 units domestically.

== Track listing ==
Christmas from the Heart track listing
No.	Title	Writer(s)	Producer(s)	Length
1.	"Joy to the World"	Traditional	Emanuel Kiriakou	4:19
2.	"Angels We Have Heard on High"	Traditional	Kurt Bestor	3:36
3.	"O Come All Ye Faithful"	Traditional	Kiriakou	3:19
4.	"Silent Night"	Traditional	Sam Cardon; Richard Parkinson	4:49
5.	"The First Noel"	Traditional	Kiriakou	4:32
6.	"O Holy Night"	Traditional	Cardon; Parkinson	5:55
7.	"Have Yourself a Merry Little Christmas" (featuring Charice Pempengco)	Hugh Martin; Ralph Blane	Kiriakou	3:42
8.	"I'll Be Home for Christmas"	Walter Kent; Kim Gannon; Buck Ram	Kiriakou	3:01
9.	"Pat-a-Pan"	Traditional	Bestor; John Hancock	3:25
10.	"What Child Is This?"	Traditional	Cardon; Parkinson	4:47
11.	"Riu Riu Chiu"	Traditional	Hancock	3:54
12.	"Ave Maria"	Traditional	Bestor	5:44
13.	"Melodies of Christmas"	David Archuleta; Z. Picante	Cardon; Archuleta	4:35
Total length:				56:32

== Charts ==
Weekly performance for Christmas from the Heart
Chart (2009)	Peak position
Canadian Albums (Nielsen SoundScan)	96
US Billboard 200	30
US Top Holiday Albums (Billboard)	2
