= A Little Too Not Over You =

Single by David Archuleta

from the album David Archuleta
- Released: January 6, 2009 (U.S. Airplay)
- Recorded: 2008
- Genre: Pop
- Length: 3:18
- Label: Jive
- Songwriters: David Archuleta, Matthew Gerrard, Mike Krompass, Robbie Nevil
- Producers: Mike Krompass, Robbie Nevil, Matthew Gerrard

David Archuleta singles chronology
"Crush" (2008)	"A Little Too Not Over You" (2009)	"Touch My Hand" (2009)

"A Little Too Not Over You" is the official second single by American Idol season 7 runner-up David Archuleta, taken from his self-titled debut album. It released to radio on January 6, 2009. On the Radio Disney Music Mailbag, this song got 99% of the votes to pick it. Archuleta confirmed the song's release on his official MySpace page. The song charted on the Billboard Bubbling Under Hot 100 Singles at number 14, having sold a total of 247,000 copies as of March 4, 2010.

== Tracklist ==
Remixes EP

1. "A Little Too Not Over You" (Tonal Remix) – 3:39
2. "A Little Too Not Over You" (Jason Nevins Club Mix) – 6:56
3. "A Little Too Not Over You" (Jason Nevins Radio Mix) – 3:50
4. "A Little Too Not Over You" (Mental Instruments Remix) – 2:54
5. "A Little Too Not Over You" (Instrumental Version) – 3:16
6. "A Little Too Not Over You" (Acapella Version) – 3:16

Other Versions

- Sonic Ether Remix (4:01)
- BabieBoyBlew Video Remix (3:45)

== Music video ==
A music video was shot with director Scott Speer in late November. The video premiered on December 15, 2008, on Yahoo! Music. It features Archuleta looking through pictures on a camera which is an Exilim S10, and reflecting on a relationship with a girl. The video became available for download on iTunes on December 23, 2008.

== Personnel ==
- David Archuleta – vocals
- Sean Hurley – bass
- Randy Cooke – drums
- Mike Krompass – electric guitar, acoustic guitar
- Dapo Torimiro – keyboards
- Storm Lee Gardner – backing vocals

== Release history ==
Release dates and formats for "A Little Too Not Over You"
Region	Date	Format	Label(s)	Ref.
United States	January 6, 2009	Mainstream airplay	Jive	
