= Something 'Bout Love =

Single by David Archuleta

from the album The Other Side of Down
- Released: July 20, 2010
- Genre: Pop
- Length: 4:22 (Album Version); 4:01 (Radio Edit)
- Label: Jive
- Songwriter(s): David Archuleta, Sam Hollander, Dave Katz, Chris DeStefano
- Producer(s): S*A*M and Sluggo, co-produced by Chris DeStefano

David Archuleta singles chronology
"Touch My Hand" (2009)	"Something 'Bout Love" (2010)	"Elevator" (2010)

"Something 'Bout Love" is the official first single by American singer David Archuleta from his second pop album The Other Side of Down which was released on October 5, 2010.

== Background ==
On June 24, 2010, Jive Records announced that "Something 'Bout Love" would be exclusively sold and available for download at Archuleta's official website on July 13, 2010, and everywhere else on July 20, 2010. On June 28, 2010, Archuleta gave his fans the chance to preview "Something 'Bout Love" via telephone. Jive Records announced the news as well. On July 1, 2010, "Something 'Bout Love" started streaming exclusively on Archuleta's official website. On July 8, 2010, Jive announced that "Something 'Bout Love" was going to be released everywhere on July 20, 2010, and gave the option to preorder Other Side of Down and receive "Something 'Bout Love" as an instant download on Archuleta's official website. Also on July 8, 2010, "Something 'Bout Love" received its official cover art.

== Music video ==
The music video for the song premiered on August 5 on VEVO. It was directed by Declan Whitebloom, who directed Crush back in 2008. The video was released on iTunes on August 10. The music video uses the radio edit version of the song.

The video starts with Archuleta walking down a sidewalk while singing the intro. There was also a scene featuring Archuleta's brother playing basketball with his friends and also another showing a boyfriend helping his girlfriend skateboard. The video mainly focuses on Archuleta in a party singing somewhere in a crowd and also singing in an alley. Halfway through the video, a nerdy man is seen alone with no friends while the crowd is having all the fun. Then not long later a girl walks over to him and they make conversation. Also, Archuleta receives a text a little after that scene. Towards the end, Archuleta is seen taking shots of the crowd having fun partying with a Sony Cybershot camera.

The product placements on the video are Sony Cybershot camera, Sony headphones, and Sony Ericcson XPERIA mobile phone.

== Release history ==
Country	Release date	Format	Label
United States	July 20, 2010	Music download	Jive
Belgium	August 25, 2010	Music download	Sony Music
Netherlands	August 25, 2010	Music download	Sony Music

== Chart performance ==
"Something 'Bout Love" has sold 21,000 copies as of July 28, 2010, according to Nielsen SoundScan. It peaked at number 48 on Pop Airplay and at number 4 on the Bubbling Under Hot 100 chart.

=== Charts ===
Chart (2010)	Peak position
US Bubbling Under Hot 100 Singles (Billboard)	4
