= Warners Bay High School =

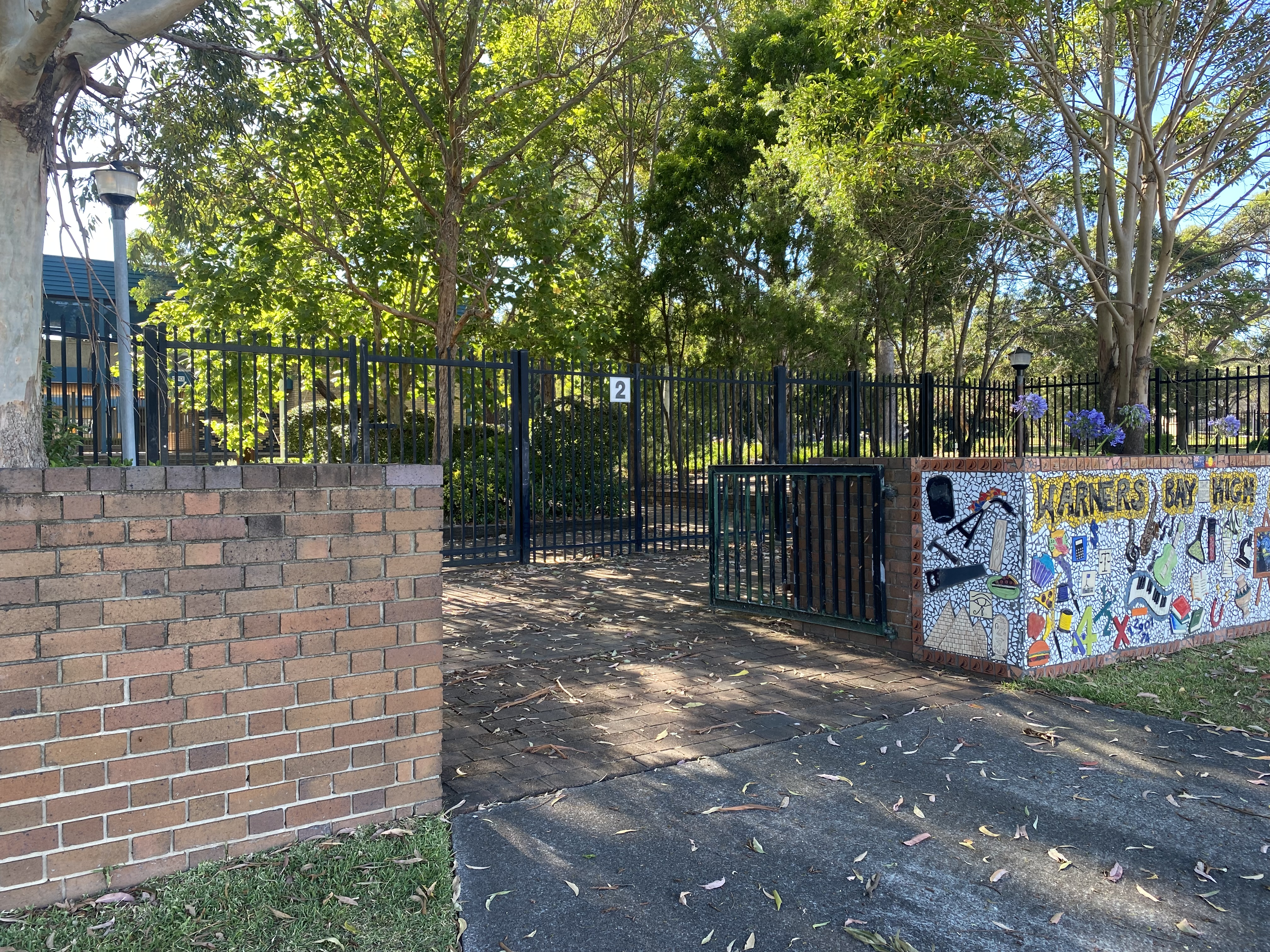

Location
- Warners Bay, City of Lake Macquarie, Hunter Region, New South Wales; Australia; 32°58′4.8410″S 151°39′11.7654″E

Information
- Type: Government-funded co-educational comprehensive secondary day school
- Motto: Quality Education for All
- Established: January 1966; 60 years ago
- Educational authority: New South Wales Department of Education
- Principal: Marcus Neale
- Teaching staff: 87.4 (on an FTE basis) (2018)
- Years: 7–12
- Enrolment: 1,294 (2018)
- Campus type: Suburban
- Colours: Navy blue and white
- Website: warnersbay-h.schools.nsw.gov.au
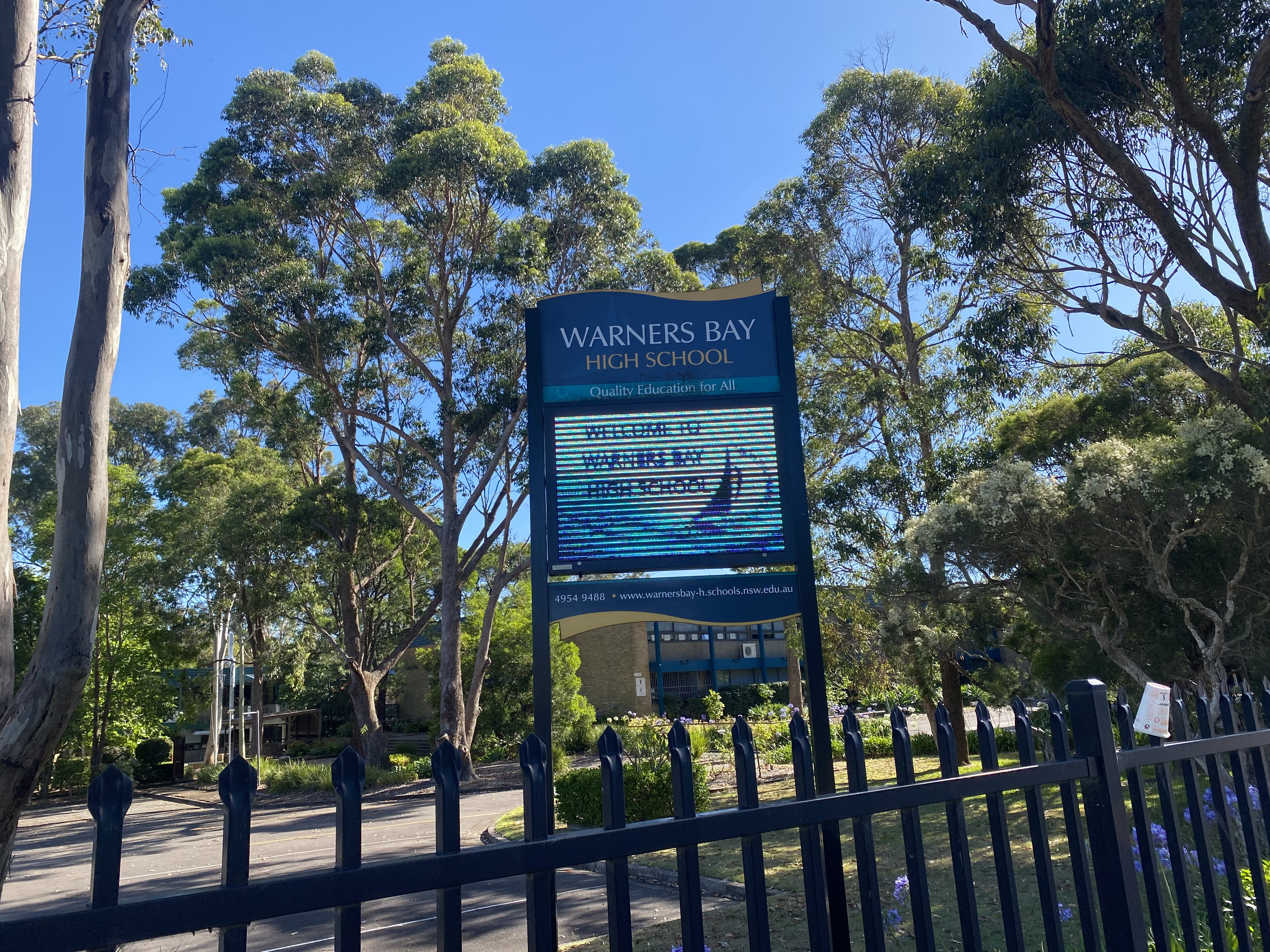

Warners Bay High School is a government-funded co-educational comprehensive secondary day school, located in Warners Bay, a suburb of the City of Lake Macquarie, in the Hunter region of New South Wales, Australia.

Established in January 1966, the school caters for approximately 1,300 students in 2018, from Year 7 to Year 12, of whom three percent identified as Indigenous Australians and seven percent were from a language background other than English. The school is operated by the NSW Department of Education; the principal is Marcus Neale.

== Notable alumni ==
- Morgan Evans – country music artist
- Benn Harradine – athlete and Australian representative to the 2012 Olympics
- David Higgins – archer and Australian representative at the 1984 Paralympics
- Angus Goodwin - Ocean Alley lead guitarist

== See also ==
- List of government schools in New South Wales: Q–Z
- Education in Australia
