= Diamonds (Morgan Evans song) =

Single by Morgan Evans
- Released: 8 November 2019
- Genre: Country
- Length: 2:52
- Label: Warner Music Nashville
- Songwriters: Morgan Evans; Chris DeStefano; Evan Bogart
- Producer: Chris DeStefano

Morgan Evans singles chronology
| "Young Again" (2019) | "Diamonds" (2019) | "All I Want for Christmas Is you" (2020) |

"Diamonds" is a song by Australian singer songwriter Morgan Evans, released on 8 November 2019 as the lead single from Evans' forthcoming third studio album. The week following its release, it was the most added song on Australian radio. The song has peaked at number 94 on The Australian ARIA charts.

The song won Most Performed Country Work at the APRA Music Awards of 2021.

== Background ==
Evans said the song is a love song written for wife Kelsea Ballerini. Evans said "It's a fun love song, but deeper than that it celebrates that journey, from lost to found, you feel when you meet that person and everything changes, forever". Evans further said "I handpicked my dream band for the session and I can hear each of their personalities in the record. It just sounds really fresh to me, I'm really proud of that, I can't wait to start playing it live!".

== Music video ==
The music video was released on 12 November 2019.

== Track listing ==
Original/ International Versions
| No. | Title | Length |
|---|---|---|
| 1. | "Diamonds" | 2:52 |

Acoustic
| No. | Title | Length |
|---|---|---|
| 1. | "Diamonds" (Acoustic version) | 2:48 |

Cash Cash remix
| No. | Title | Length |
|---|---|---|
| 1. | "Diamonds" (Cash Cash remix) | 2:59 |

== Charts ==
| Chart (2019–20) | Peak position |
|---|---|
| Australia (ARIA Charts) | 94 |
| US Country Airplay (Billboard) | 52 |

== Release history ==
| Region | Date | Format(s) | Label | Version |
|---|---|---|---|---|
| Australia | 8 November 2019 | Digital download, streaming, Contemporary Hit Radio | Warner Australasia | Original |
| Worldwide | 27 November 2019 | Digital download, streaming | Warner Nashville | International mix |
| Worldwide | 3 April 2020 | Digital download, streaming | Warner Nashville | Acoustic |
| Worldwide | 29 May 2020 | Digital download, streaming | Warner Nashville | Cash Cash Remix |
