= David Archuleta (album) =

Studio album by David Archuleta
- Released: November 10, 2008
- Length: 44:28
- Label: Jive; 19
- Producer: David Archuleta; Antonina Armato; Andreas Carlsson; JC Chasez; Desmond Child; Dapo; Matthew Gerrard; Jimmy Harry; David Hodges; Tim James; Steve Kipner; Emanuel Kiriakou; Mike Krompass; Midi Mafia; Steve McEwan; Robbie Nevil; Eric Rosse; Wayne Wilkins

David Archuleta chronology
David Archuleta (2008)	Christmas from the Heart (2009)

Singles from David Archuleta
- 1. "Crush" Released: August 12, 2008; 2. "A Little Too Not Over You" Released: January 6, 2009; 3. "Touch My Hand" Released: June 9, 2009

David Archuleta is the debut album by American singer David Archuleta. It was first released in Asia on November 10, 2008, through Jive Records. Recorded after he finished as the runner-up on the seventh season of American Idol, the label arranged for him to work with a variety of musicians on material for the album, including Andreas Carlsson, JC Chasez, Desmond Child, Dapo, Matthew Gerrard, Jimmy Harry, David Hodges, Tim James, Steve Kipner, Emanuel Kiriakou, Robbie Nevil, Eric Rosse, Wayne Wilkins and duo Midi Mafia. Archuleta co-wrote on several tracks on the album.

The album received generally mixed reviews, with critics praising his voice but also criticizing the album's material as safe or bland. It launched at number two on the US Billboard 200 with 183,000 first-week sales and was certified gold in January 2009. By January 2011, the album had sold a total of 764,000 copies domestically. "Crush," released in August 2008, debuted at number two on the US Billboard Hot 100 and sold nearly 2 million copies, while the second single "A Little Too Not Over You" hit radio in January 2009. David Archuleta's release coincided with his United Kingdom tour with McFly in April and May 2009.

== Background ==
Archuleta auditioned for American Idol during the San Diego tryouts at Qualcomm Stadium in July 2007, earning a ticket to Hollywood after performing John Mayer's "Waiting on the World to Change." Sixteen at the time, he continued attending school while competing on the show and, as a minor, was required to have a parent or guardian present. During the competition, Archuleta gained attention for his stylistic and interpretive choices and ultimately advanced to the finale, where he received 44 percent of the vote, finishing in second place. After the finale, Archuleta made his first appearances on the US music charts with the three songs he performed on American Idol finale: "Don't Let the Sun Go Down on Me", "In This Moment", and "Imagine" debuted on the Billboard Hot 100 chart the week of June 7, 2008. "Imagine" entered at number 36, giving Archuleta his first top-forty hit, "Don't Let the Sun Go Down on Me" at 58, and "In This Moment" at 60. In June 2008, Archuleta signed with Jive Records and 19 Recordings and began work on his debut album.

== Promotion ==
The first single, "Crush", was released to radio on August 1, 2008, and was commercially released on August 12, 2008. Its first week it debuted at number two on the Billboard Hot 100 with 166,000 units sold. The single has sold almost 2 million copies in the United States. The second single, "A Little Too Not Over You", a song which he co-wrote, was released to radio on January 6, 2009.

On March 13, 2009, Archuleta released a couple of songs from David Archuleta on iTunes that were previously not available as single downloads. "Works for Me" came as a bonus track on the Walmart version of David Archuleta, and "Somebody Out There" was exclusive to those who pre-ordered the album on iTunes. Both songs were also included in a four-track EP titled Four for the Fans, released in 2010 exclusively on iTunes, before the release of Archuleta's single, "Something 'Bout Love", from his third studio album, The Other Side of Down (2010).

== Critical reception ==
Professional ratings
Aggregate scores
Source	Rating
Metacritic	58/100
Review scores
Source	Rating
About.com	4/5 stars
AllMusic	2.5/5 stars
Entertainment Weekly	C+
Los Angeles Times	1.5/4 stars
Rolling Stone	2.5/5 stars
USA Today	3/4 stars

David Archuleta received generally mixed reviews from music critics, averaging a 58 out of a 100 among averaged reviews on Metacritic. Kerri Mason from Billboard praised David Archuleta, calling it "charming" and filled with performances "meant for arenas." Mason also credited Archuleta as having a "once-in-a-decade pop voice: A silky tenor with a natural melancholy." Ken Barnes of USA Today gave the album a positive review saying, "On American Idol runner-up David Archuleta's first, self-titled album, the 17-year-old singer delivers a non-stop succession of polite pop songs swathed in gauzy cotton-candy textures and catchy choruses. And that's exactly what he should be doing." The New York Times critic Ben Ratliff remarked that Archuleta "has a lovely, foggy R&B voice out of scale with his small body" and further wrote: "The music, made by many producers and songwriters, averages out different forms of radio-format blandness, with tinges of Coldplay and Shania Twain, and a few dollops of good writing."

Writing for The Boston Globe, Joan Anderman determined that "someone smart decided to stick with tasteful, understated production. Archuleta's delivery is likewise low-key and attractive, if predictably generic. We do get a glimpse of previously unheard heft and depth, respectively, on vaguely edgy "Desperate" and the winsome ballad "To Be With You." But it's never more than a short step back to the safe, unscintillating center where Archuleta belongs." Caryn Ganz from Rolling Stone noted that "on the most recent season of American Idol, Archuleta was a golden-voiced koala, too sweet to be sexy. His debut is similarly flavorless: Beautifully sung but snoozy tunes like "My Hands" never achieve takeoff, and his chaste voice is a poor match for lovey-dovey lyrics." August Brown, writing for The Los Angeles Times, felt that "the record is larded with awkward modernist R&B, Christian semaphore ballads like "You Can" and warm-milk mewling that makes David Cook, Archuleta's Idol foe, sound like Robert Plant". Entertainment Weekly's Chris Willman found that "on American Idol's seventh season, David Archuleta had some personality — something you’ll struggle to remember while taking in this bland, amnesia-inducing collection."

== Commercial performance ==
David Archuleta debuted at number two on the US Billboard 200 chart in the week of November 29, 2008, with sales of 183,000 copies. On January 29, 2009, the album was certified gold by the Recording Industry Association of America (RIAA). By January 2011, it had sold 764,000 copies domestically, according to USA Today

== Track listing ==
David Archuleta track listing
No.	Title	Writer(s)	Producer(s)	Length
1.	"Crush"	Jess Cates; David Hodges; Emanuel Kiriakou	Kiriakou; Hodges^{[a]}	3:32
2.	"Touch My Hand"	Steve Kipner; Steve McEwan; Wayne Wilkins	Wilkins; Kipner; McEwan	4:21
3.	"Barriers"	Kipner; McEwan; Wilkins	Wilkins; Kipner; McEwan	3:50
4.	"My Hands"	Kiriakou; Zukhan Bey; James Fauntleroy	Kiriakou	4:04
5.	"A Little Too Not Over You"	David Archuleta; Matthew Gerrard; Mike Krompass; Robbie Nevil	Gerrard; Krompass; Nevil	3:18
6.	"You Can"	Antonina Armato; Tim James	Armato; James; Kiriakou^{[b]}	3:42
7.	"Running"	Fauntleroy; Waynne Nugent; Kevin Risto; Steve Russell; Dapo Torimiro	Midi Mafia; Dapo	3:35
8.	"Desperate"	Andreas Carlsson; Desmond Child; Alexander Rethwisch; Konstantin Rethwisch	Carlsson; Child	3:41
9.	"To Be with You"	Kiriakou; Kara DioGuardi	Kiriakou	3:25
10.	"Don't Let Go"	Archuleta; JC Chasez; Jimmy Harry	Chasez; Harry	3:47
11.	"Your Eyes Don't Lie"	Armato; James; Devrim Karaoğlu	Armato; James; Kiriakou^{[b]}	3:04
12.	"Angels"	Guy Chambers; Robbie Williams	Eric Ivan Rosse	4:09

Walmart bonus track
No.	Title	Writer(s)	Producer(s)	Length
13.	"Works for Me"	Daniel Bedingfield; Toby Lightman	Bedingfield; Drew and Shannon	3:17

Japanese and UK edition bonus tracks
No.	Title	Writer(s)	Producer(s)	Length
7.	"Works for Me"	Archuleta; Bedingfield; Lightman	Bedingfield; Drew and Shannon	3:17
11.	"Waiting for Yesterday"	Hodges; McMorran; J. Williams	Kiriakou; Hodges	3:27
13.	"Save the Day"	M. Seminari; C. Nielsen; D. Baker	John Hancock	3:53
14.	"Crush" (Blast Off Productions Radio Remix)	Cates; Hodges; Kiriakou	Kiriakou; Hodges^{[a]}; Blast Off^{[a]}	4:01

Digital expanded edition bonus tracks
No.	Title	Writer(s)	Producer(s)	Length
13.	"Waiting for Yesterday"	Hodges; Steven McMorran; Joy Williams	Kiriakou; Hodges	3:27
14.	"Falling"	Archuleta	Kurt Bestor; Hancock	4:32
15.	"Let Me Go"	Thomas Meredith; Sheppard Solomon	Rosse	3:46

iTunes Store pre-order edition bonus track
No.	Title	Writer(s)	Producer(s)	Length
16.	"Somebody Out There"	David Archuleta; Mike Krompass; Steve Diamond	Krompass; Steve Diamond^{[b]}	3:42

2021 digital deluxe edition bonus tracks
No.	Title	Writer(s)	Producer(s)	Length
17.	"Works for Me"	Bedingfield; Lightman	Bedingfield; Drew and Shannon	3:17
18.	"Zero Gravity"	Archuleta; Gerrard; Krompass; Diamond	Krompass; Steve Diamond^{[b]}	3:27
19.	"Save the Day"	Seminari; Nielsen; Baker	John Hancock	3:53
20.	"A Thousand Miles"	Vanessa Carlton	Krompass	4:23

Notes

- ^{^[a]} denotes additional producer(s)
- ^{^[b]} denotes co-producer(s)

== Personnel ==
Adapted from AllMusic.

- David Archuleta – piano, lead vocals, background vocals
- Antonina Armato – producer
- Jeff Baker – audio engineer
- Jeff Baker – assistant engineer
- Brett Banducci – viola
- Zukhan Bey – drum programming
- Jeff Bova – arranger, string arrangements, strings
- Cara Bridgins – production coordination
- Andreas Carlsson – producer
- JC Chasez – piano, producer, background vocals
- Desmond Child – producer
- Adam Comstock – audio engineer, engineer
- Randy Cooke – drums
- Tom Coyne – mastering
- Dorian Crozier – drums, engineer
- Tim Davies – conductor
- Tommy Denander – engineer, guitar, guitars
- Thomas Diener – viola
- Kara DioGuardi – background vocals
- Marcus Englöf – keyboards, programming
- Stephen Erdody – celli, cello
- James Fauntleroy – background vocals
- Jeff Fenster – a&r
- Marlow Fisher – viola
- Chris Fudurich – engineer
- Storm L. Gardner – background vocals
- Brian Gately – production coordination
- Humberto Gatica – vocal engineer
- Matthew Gerrard – audio engineer, engineer, keyboards, producer, programming
- Julie Gigante – violin
- Conor Gilligan – assistant
- Matty Green – assistant
- Steve Hammons – audio engineer, engineer
- Trevor Handy – cello
- Jimmy Harry – bass, bass instrument, engineer, guitars, keyboards, producer
- Paula Hochhalter – cello
- David Hodges – keyboards, piano, producer, programming, background vocals
- Ross Hogarth – audio engineer, engineer
- Sean Hurley – bass, bass instrument
- Devrim "DK" Karaoglu – producer
- Steve Kipner – producer
- Emanuel Kiriakou – bass, bass instrument, drum programming, engineer, guitar (acoustic), guitar (electric), keyboards, piano, producer, background vocals
- Mike Krompass – audio engineer, engineer, guitar (acoustic), guitar (electric), producer
- Natalie Leggett – violin
- Dimitrie Leivici – violin
- Thomas Lindberg – bass, bass instrument
- Nigel Lundemo – audio engineer, engineer
- Brian Macleod – drums
- Erik Madrid – assistant
- Manny Marroquin – mixing
- Maria P. Marulanda – art direction, design
- Luke Maurer – viola
- Steve McEwan – producer
- Justin Meldal-johnsen – Bass Instrument
- Corey Miller – assistant engineer, audio engineer
- Robbie Nevil – keyboards, producer, programming
- Paul Palmer – mixing
- Alex Papaconstantinou – keyboards, programming
- Searmi Park – violin
- Cameron Patrick – violin
- Brian Paturalski – mixing
- Tim Pierce – guitar, guitars
- Christian Plata – assistant
- Shari Reich – artist coordination
- Chris Reynolds – audio engineer, digital editing, engineer
- Jeff Riedel – photography
- Cristián Robles – vocal engineer
- Andros Rodriguez – engineer
- Francesco Romano – guitar (acoustic)
- Eric Ivan Rosse – arranger, keyboards, mixing
- Peter Rotter – contractor
- Ken Sarkey – assistant
- Nicole Simon – production coordination
- Jake Simpson – background vocals
- Jeanne Skrocki – violin
- Spike Stent – mixing
- Aaron Sterling – drums
- Cameron Stone – celli, cello
- Shane Swayney – guitar, guitars, keyboards, programming
- Sarah Thornblade – violin
- Pat Thrall – digital editing, engineer, mixing
- Dapo Torimiro – keyboards, producer
- Cecilia Tsan – cello
- Marc VanGool – guitar, guitars
- Jon Vella – engineer, guitar, guitars
- Bruce Watson – guitar, guitars
- Bruce Waynne – producer
- Wayne Wilkins – drums, keyboards, producer
- Margaret Wooten – violin

== Charts ==
=== Weekly charts ===
Weekly chart performance for David Archuleta
Chart (2008)	Peak position
Canadian Albums Chart	14
US Billboard 200	2
US Comprehensive Albums (Billboard)	2

=== Year-end charts ===
Year-end chart performance for David Archuleta
Chart (2009)	Position
US Billboard 200	51

== Certifications ==
Certifications for David Archuleta
Region	Certification	Certified units/sales
United States (RIAA)	Gold	764,000

== Release history ==
Release history for David Archuleta
Region	Date	Label
Hong Kong	November 10, 2008	Sony Music Entertainment
Indonesia	November 10, 2008	Sony Music Entertainment
Singapore	November 10, 2008	Sony Music Entertainment
South Korea	November 11, 2008	Sony Music Entertainment
United States	November 11, 2008	Jive; 19
Canada	November 11, 2008	Sony Music Entertainment
Philippines	November 11, 2008	Sony Music Entertainment
Malaysia	November 17, 2008	Sony Music Entertainment
Australia	December 6, 2008	Sony Music Entertainment
Taiwan	December 12, 2008	Sony Music Entertainment
Japan	February 25, 2009	Sony Music Entertainment
Brazil	March 11, 2009	Sony Music Entertainment
United Kingdom	May 11, 2009	RCA
