= Morgan Evans (album) =

Studio album by Morgan Evans
- Released: 14 March 2014
- Recorded: Nashville, Tennessee
- Genre: Country
- Length: 57:27
- Label: Warner Australasia
- Producer: Jedd Hughes

Morgan Evans chronology
While We're Young (2012)	Morgan Evans (2014)	Morgan Evans EP (2018)

Singles from Morgan Evans
- 1. "One Eye for an Eye" Released: 3 February 2014; 2. "Like a Tornado" Released: April 2014

Morgan Evans is the debut studio album by Australian country music singer Morgan Evans. It was released in March 2014 and peaked at number 20 on the ARIA Charts.

The album was confirmed on 17 January 2014, with the single "One Eye for an Eye" released in February 2014. Evans said he's been “working toward this album since I started my first band at the age of 13.”

== Critical reception ==
Professional ratings
Review scores
Source	Rating
Renowned for Sound	4/5 stars

Melissa Redman from Renowned for Sound said; "His vocals in all songs are effortless and this makes the album all the more enjoyable to listen to. The topics and issues covered in these tracks are a breath of fresh air. From the thrill of infatuation in "I Wanna Go", a manifesto on life in "Childhood Heart" and a dream of a better world in "All in This Together", Evans creates songs that are relatable for a vast demographic of people." adding "Morgan Evans is a great first album. Many of the songs are upbeat and will easily lift your spirits with its guitar heavy, country tunes."

== Track listing ==
1. "Like a Tornado" – 4:14
2. "I Wanna Go" – 3:19
3. "Love You Home" – 3:25
4. "One Eye for an Eye" – 3:35
5. "Childhood Heart" – 4:09
6. "All in This Together" – 3:15
7. "Make You Feel Like a Woman" – 3:57
8. "The Best of Me" – 3:46
9. "Another Goodbye Kiss" – 3:15
10. "Best I Never Had" – 3:24
11. "Wide Open Road" – 3:04
12. "The Cape" (featuring Kasey Chambers) – 3:11
13. "Live Each Day" – 4:03
14. "Big Skies" – 3:44
15. "While We're Young" – 3:21
16. "Carry On" – 3:44

== Charts ==
Morgan Evans debuted and peaked at number 20 on the ARIA Charts in March 2014.

=== Weekly charts ===
Chart (2014)	Peak position
Australian Albums (ARIA)	20
Australian Artist Albums (ARIA)	4
Australian Country Albums (ARIA)	1

=== Year-end charts ===
Chart (2014)	Position
ARIA Country Albums Chart	42

== Release history ==
Region	Date	Format	Label	Catalogue
Australia	14 March 2014	CD; digital download	Warner Australasia	5419611352
