= Things That We Drink To =

Studio album by Morgan Evans
- Released: 12 October 2018
- Genre: Country
- Length: 36:33
- Labels: Warner Nashville; Warner Australasia
- Producer: Chris DeStefano

Morgan Evans chronology
| Morgan Evans EP (2018) | Things That We Drink To (2018) | The Country and the Coast (Side A) (2021) |

Singles from Things That We Drink To
- 1. "Kiss Somebody" Released: 21 July 2017; 2. "I Do" Released: 8 December 2017; 3. "Day Drunk" Released: 8 June 2018; 4. "Young Again" Released: May 2019

Things That We Drink To is the second studio album by Australian country music singer Morgan Evans. The album was announced on 31 August 2018 and was released on 12 October 2018. The project is a musical reflection of Evans' journey from Australia to Nashville. Evans co-wrote each track alongside the album's producer, Chris DeStefano.

At the ARIA Music Awards of 2019, the album won the ARIA Award for ARIA Award for Best Country Album.

== Background ==
In 2016, Evans travelled from Australia to Nashville, Tennessee to make a new home in the United States. Morgan began songwriting and working alongside some of the industry's best who've helped him turn this journey into 11 songs. Evans told Taste of Country in 2018, "I've learned to be more honest and tell my story rather than the story that I think someone wants to hear."

Evans married fellow country star Kelsea Ballerini, embarked on his first American tour and released his first U.S. radio single, "Kiss Somebody" and lost his manager Rob Potts who died in a motor cycle accident in October 2017.

== Critical reception ==
Taste of Country said "Celebration is an overall theme of Things That We Drink To as Evans looks back on the times that have defined him since he started building a new life on the other side of the world."

Chris Parton from Rolling Stone said called the album a "...breezy mix of up-tempo jams, lovestruck anthems and loop-driven creative mojo." adding "Things That We Drink To a truly revealing debut, both personally and artistically."

== Commercial performance ==
Things That We Drink To debuted at No. 9 on Top Country Albums with 4,000 copies sold, or 7,000 in equivalent album units. The album has sold 5,200 copies in the United States as of November 2018.

== Track listing ==
All tracks are written by Morgan Evans and Chris DeStefano, with additional co-writers as noted.

Things That We Drink To track listing
| No. | Title | Writer(s) | Length |
|---|---|---|---|
| 1. | "American" | Josh Osborne | 3:03 |
| 2. | "Kiss Somebody" | Osborne | 3:33 |
| 3. | "I Do" | Ashley Gorley | 3:30 |
| 4. | "Song for the Summer" | David Hodges | 3:32 |
| 5. | "Day Drunk" | Lindy Robbins | 3:14 |
| 6. | "Dance with Me" (featuring Kelsea Ballerini) | | 3:19 |
| 7. | "Me on You" | Osborne | 3:26 |
| 8. | "Things That We Drink To" | Osborne | 3:08 |
| 9. | "We Dream" | Jaren Johnston; Jon Nite | 3:36 |
| 10. | "Everything Changes" | Blair Daly | 3:17 |
| 11. | "Young Again" | Josh Kear | 2:55 |
| Total length: | | | 36:33 |

== Personnel ==
Credits adapted from Tidal.

- Morgan Evans – lead vocals, background vocals (all tracks); acoustic guitar (tracks 1–4, 6–11)
- Chris DeStefano – acoustic guitar, banjo, electric guitar, programming, production, recording, digital editing (all tracks); piano (1–9), background vocals (1, 3–11), drums (1, 3, 7, 8)
- Justin Niebank – mixing
- Drew Bollman – mixing assistance
- Adam Ayan – mastering
- Nir Z – engineering (1, 4–6, 9–11), drums (2, 4–6, 9–11)
- Katie Ohh – background vocals (5)
- Kirby Smith – background vocals (5)
- Kelsea Ballerini – vocals (6)
- David Hodges – piano (10)

== Charts ==
=== Weekly charts ===
| Chart (2018) | Peak position |
|---|---|
| Australian Albums (ARIA) | 5 |
| US Billboard 200 | 106 |
| US Country Albums (Billboard) | 9 |

=== Year-end charts ===
Year-end chart performance for Things That We Drink To
| Chart (2018) | Position |
|---|---|
| Australian Country Albums (ARIA) | 18 |
| Chart (2019) | Position |
| Australian Albums (ARIA) | 94 |
| Australian Country Albums (ARIA) | 4 |
| Chart (2020) | Position |
| Australian Country Albums (ARIA) | 13 |
| Chart (2021) | Position |
| Australian Country Albums (ARIA) | 16 |
| Chart (2022) | Position |
| Australian Country Albums (ARIA) | 18 |
| Chart (2023) | Position |
| Australian Country Albums (ARIA) | 41 |
| Chart (2024) | Position |
| Australian County Albums (ARIA) | 60 |
| Chart (2025) | Position |
| Australian County Albums (ARIA) | 100 |

== Release history ==
| Region | Date | Format | Label | Catalogue |
|---|---|---|---|---|
| Australia | 12 October 2018 | CD; digital download | Warner Music Nashville, Warner Australasia | 9362490549 |
