= Morgan Evans EP =

EP by Morgan Evans
- Released: 10 August 2018
- Genre: Country
- Label: Warner Bros. Nashville
- Producer: Chris DeStefano

Morgan Evans chronology
| Morgan Evans (2014) | Morgan Evans EP (2018) | Things That We Drink To (2018) |

Singles from Morgan Evans EP
- 1. "Kiss Somebody" Released: 21 July 2017; 2. "I Do" Released: 8 December 2017; 3. "Day Drunk" Released: 8 June 2018; 4. "Young Again" Released: May 2019

Morgan Evans EP is the third extended play by Australian country music singer Morgan Evans. The EP was produced by Chris DeStefano, and was released on 10 August 2018.

== Track listing ==
| No. | Title | Writer(s) | Length |
|---|---|---|---|
| 1. | "Day Drunk" | Morgan Evans; Chris DeStefano; Lindy Robbins | 3:14 |
| 2. | "American" | Evans; DeStefano; Josh Osborne | 3:03 |
| 3. | "I Do" | Evans; DeStefano; Ashley Gorley | 3:29 |
| 4. | "Kiss Somebody" | Evans; DeStefano; Osborne | 3:32 |
| 5. | "Young Again" | Evans; DeStefano; Josh Kear | 2:55 |

== Personnel ==
- Chris DeStefano - banjo, bass guitar, drums, acoustic guitar, electric guitar, piano, programming, background vocals
- Morgan Evans - acoustic guitar, lead vocals, background vocals
- Nir Z. - drums

== Release history ==
| Region | Date | Format | Label |
|---|---|---|---|
| Australia | 10 August 2018 | Digital download | Warner Bros. |
