= Patapan =

French Christmas carol in Burgundian dialect

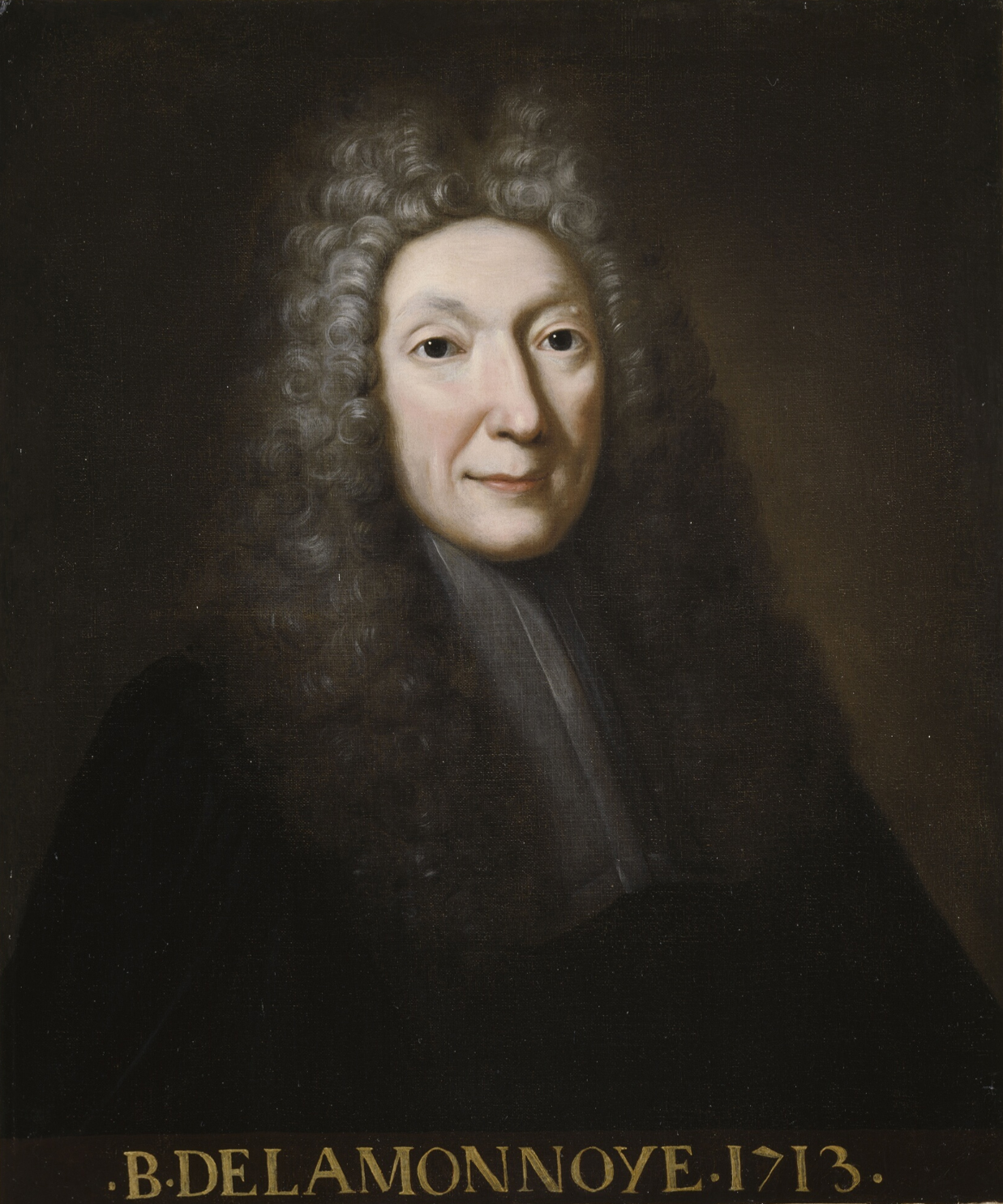
Bernard de la Monnoye

"Patapan" (or "Pat-a-pan") is a French Christmas carol in Burgundian dialect, later adapted into English. It was written by Bernard de la Monnoye (1641–1728) and first published in Noël bourguignons in 1720. Its original title is "Guillô, pran ton tamborin" ("Willie, Bring Your Little Drum" or "Willie, Take Your Little Drum").

The carol revolves around the birth of Jesus, and is told from the perspective of shepherds playing simple instruments—flutes and drums—the onomatopoeic sound of which gives the song its name; "patapan" mimics the sound of the drum, "tu-re-lu-re-lu" the flute. It inspired the 1941 carol "The Little Drummer Boy" with its chorus of "pa-rum-pa-pum-pum".

== Lyrics ==
Burgundian
Guillô, pran ton tamborin;
Toi, pran tai fleúte, Rôbin!
Au son de cés instruman,
Turelurelu, patapatapan,
Au son de cés instruman
Je diron Noei gaiman

C' étó lai môde autrefoi
De loüé le Roi dé Roi,
Au son de cés instruman,
Turelurelu, patapatapan,
Au son de cés instruman,
Ai nos an fau faire autan.

Ce jor le Diale at ai cu
Randons an graice ai Jesu
Au son de cés instruman,
Turelurelu, patapatapan,
Au son de cés instruman,
Fezon lai nique ai Satan.

L'homme et Dei son pu d'aicor
Que lai fleúte & le tambor.
Au son de cés instruman,
Turelurelu, patapatapan,
Au son de cés instruman,
Chanton, danson, sautons-an.

French
Guillaume, prends ton tambourin,
Toi, prends ta flûte, Robin;
Au son de ces instruments,
Turelurelu, patapatapan,
Au son de ces instruments,
Je dirai Noël gaîment.

C'était la mode d'autrefois,
De louer le Roi des rois,
Au son de ces instruments,
Turelurelu, patapatapan,
Au son de ces instruments,
Il nous en faut faire autant.

Ce jour le diable est vaincu
Rendons-en grâce à Jésus.
Au son de ces instruments,
Turelurelu, patapatapan,
Au son de ces instruments,
Faisons la nique à Satan.

L'homme et Dieu sont plus d'accord,
Que la flûte et le tambour;
Au son de ces instruments,
Turelurelu, patapatapan,
Au son de ces instruments,
Chantons, dansons, sautons en!

Willie, bring your little drum,
Robin take your flute and come!
When we hear the music bright
we will sing Noel this night,
When we hear the fife and drum,
Christmas should be frolicsome.

Thus the men of olden days
for the King of Kings to praise,
When they heard the fife and drum,
tu-re-lu-re-lu, pat-a-pat-a-pan,
When they hear the fife and drum,
sure, our children won't be dumb.

God and man are now become
more at one than fife and drum.
When you hear the fife and drum,
tu-re-lu-re-lu, pat-a-pat-a-pan,
When you hear the fife and drum,
dance and make the village hum.

Billy, bring your new red drum,
Robby [Robin], get your fife and come
Fife and drum together play,
Patta-patta-pan, turra-lurra-lay,
Fife and drum together play,
On this joyous Holiday

When the men of olden days
To the King of Kings gave praise,
On the fife and drum did play,
Patta-patta-pan, turra-lurra-lay,
On the fife and drum did play,
So their hearts were glad and gay

There is music in the air
You can hear it everywhere,
Fife and drum together play,
Patta-patta-pan, turra-lurra-lay,
Fife and drum together play,
On this joyous Holiday

God and man today become
More in tune than fife and drum,
Fife and drum together play,
Patta-patta-pan, turra-lurra-lay,
Fife and drum together play,
On this joyous Holiday.

== Melody ==
Source
