= I Do (Morgan Evans song) =

Single by Morgan Evans

from the album Morgan Evans EP & Things That We Drink To
- Released: 8 December 2017
- Genre: Country
- Length: 3:29
- Label: Warner Music Nashville
- Songwriters: Morgan Evans; Chris DeStefano; Ashley Gorley
- Producer: Chris DeStefano

Morgan Evans singles chronology
"Kiss Somebody" (2017)	"I Do" (2017)	"Day Drunk" (2018)

"I Do" is a song by Australian singer songwriter, Morgan Evans and was released on 8 December 2017 as the second single from his forthcoming second studio album, Things That We Drink To (2018). The song peaked at number 72 on the ARIA Charts and was certified gold in Australia in December 2019.

Morgan said via Instagram he wrote "I Do" "about his girlfriend, recorded it about my fiancée, releasing it about my wife" Kelsea Ballerini, whom he married on 2 December 2017 in Mexico.

Evans serenaded his wife with "I Do" live on stage at the song at Rockhampton's Rockin' Rocky on 30 December 2017 telling Ballerini on stage "This is the first time I'm performing "I Do" as the husband, so I'm just going to sing this to you."

== Reception ==
Drew Fitzgerald from One Country said "The track sums up everything found in that simple vow: falling in love, what he loves about his new wife Kelsea Ballerini, and his hope for their lifelong union" adding "Look out for this one at every 2018 wedding." Courtney Carr from The Boot described the song as "feel good" saying "Evans uses those two sacred words not only as a wedding vow but to show the progression through which every happy relationship goes."

== Track listing ==
Digital download
No.	Title	Length
1.	"I Do"	3:29

== Charts ==
Chart (2017)	Peak position
Australia (ARIA)	72

== Certifications ==
Region	Certification	Certified units/sales
Australia (ARIA)	Gold	35,000^{‡}
^{‡} Sales+streaming figures based on certification alone.

== Release history ==
Region	Date	Format(s)	Label
Australia	8 December 2017	Digital download, streaming	Warner Nashville
United States	8 December 2017	Digital download, streaming	Warner Nashville
