= Crush (David Archuleta song) =

2008 single by David Archuletta

Single by David Archuleta

from the album David Archuleta
- Released: August 12, 2008
- Recorded: 2008
- Genre: Pop; R&B
- Length: 3:33
- Label: Jive
- Songwriters: Jess Cates; David Hodges; Emanuel Kiriakou
- Producer: Emanuel Kiriakou

David Archuleta singles chronology
"Crush" (2008)	"A Little Too Not Over You" (2009)

Alternative cover
- UK single cover

"Crush" is the debut single by American Idol season seven runner-up David Archuleta. It was first released to radio stations via New York City's radio station Z100 on August 1, 2008, and commercially in the United States on August 12, 2008, through digital distribution. "Crush" was produced by Emanuel Kiriakou and co-written by Kiriakou, Jess Cates and Dave Hodges.

The song was recorded for his self-titled first album, which was released on November 11, 2008. The single reached number two on the US Billboard Hot 100 and number seven on the Canadian Hot 100.

In 2022, Archuleta stated in an interview with People that he had not fully understood why people "related" to the song until he kissed a man after coming out the previous year.

== Reception ==
"Crush" was met with positive reviews by many critics. Chuck Taylor of Billboard praised it for being a suitable match for Archuleta, citing it as a "hummable, age-appropriate midtempo pop ditty for the 17-year-old, showcasing his fine mass-appeal vocal stylings with creamy harmonies and some nice falsetto effects." He also predicted chart success for the song, saying "'Crush' is likely to put its money where its title is on the charts." Michael Slezak of Entertainment Weekly called the song "surprisingly good!" as well as "hip and contemporary." He stated, "David adroitly walks the line between giving his core fans their fill of vocal runs while showing enough restraint that he won't automatically alienate non-Idol-loving listeners."

Blender Magazine also praised the song, giving it three and a half out of five stars and claiming to have "just listened to the thing six times in a row and we're not terribly angry about spin seven." They also liked that the song seemed perfectly crafted for radio, saying, "Songs like "Crush" are great because they sound as if the radio immaculately conceived them." Ken Barnes of USA Today liked the "effortless glides into falsetto and some rousing moments in the bridge and chorus", but also said it "tends to plod", and "could become pretty tedious with repetition."

== Chart performance ==
After being released digitally in the U.S., "Crush" entered at the Billboard Hot 100 at number two on the week of August 21, 2008, with 166,000 copies sold in its first week. This was the highest entry for a song on the Hot 100 in 2008 and the highest for any song on this chart since Fall Out Boy's "This Ain't a Scene, It's an Arms Race", which also entered the chart at number two, in the chart week of February 3, 2007.

"Crush" entered the Billboard Pop 100, at number 93 and peaked at number twelve; it also made the top ten on the Billboard Hot Adult Contemporary Tracks chart. The song entered the Canadian Hot 100 at number seven in the same week. The single has sold 2,082,000 copies as of October 2012 according to Nielsen SoundScan. "Crush" was released digitally in UK on February 23, 2009, although no physical CD single was released.

== Music video ==
The music video was directed by Declan Whitebloom. The music video was first leaked on September 7, 2008, through AOL, initially restricted to Canada and then released on September 16, 2008, on iTunes. The video now has over 165 million hits on YouTube.

It consists of Archuleta on a vacation trying to get the attention of a girl (played by Hagood Coxe) on whom he apparently has a crush. At the beginning, several teens go swimming in the lake near their summer house, with one of the guys flirting with the girl in the water. After they have finished swimming, the guy runs off, while Archuleta stays behind to help the girl out of the lake. The group is also shown in a cabin playing a game involving post its, while Archuleta is also shown playing his guitar in the cabin. Another scene shows the group by a campfire with several of them paired off into couples. At the end, Archuleta goes out on the deck of the cabin, and the girl follows him out, showing that she shares his feelings. Archuleta is also shown playing the piano near a lake throughout the video.

== Charts ==
=== Weekly charts ===
Weekly chart performance for "Crush"
Chart (2008)	Peak position
Canada Hot 100 (Billboard)	7
Japan Hot 100 (Billboard)	37
Sweden (Sverigetopplistan)	36
US Billboard Hot 100	2
US Adult Contemporary (Billboard)	6
US Adult Pop Airplay (Billboard)	15
US Pop Airplay (Billboard)	13

=== Year-end charts ===
2008 year-end chart performance for "Crush"
Chart (2008)	Position
Canada (Canadian Hot 100)	89
US Billboard Hot 100	76
US Adult Contemporary (Billboard)	37

2009 year-end chart performance for "Crush"
Chart (2009)	Position
US Adult Contemporary (Billboard)	13

== Sales ==
Sales for "Crush"
Country	Sales
United States	2,127,000

== Release history ==
Release history for "Crush"
Country	Release date
United States	August 12, 2008
United Kingdom	February 23, 2009
