= Kiss Somebody =

Single by Morgan Evans

from the album Morgan Evans EP & Things That We Drink To
- Released: 21 July 2017
- Genre: Country
- Length: 3:32
- Label: Warner Music Nashville
- Songwriters: Morgan Evans; Chris DeStefano; Josh Osborne
- Producer: Chris DeStefano

Morgan Evans singles chronology
"Like a Tornado" (2014)	"Kiss Somebody" (2017)	"I Do" (2017)

"Kiss Somebody" is a song recorded by Australian country music singer Morgan Evans and was released on 21 July 2017 as the lead single from his fourth EP Morgan Evans EP and second studio album Things That We Drink To. It peaked at number 53 on the ARIA Singles Chart. It was also Evans' first single to be released to country radio in the United States, where it reached the top three on the Billboard Country Airplay and top 20 on the Hot Country Songs charts.

At the APRA Music Awards of 2018, the song won the award for Country Work of the Year.

== Background and release ==
In May 2017, Evans signed a record deal with Warner Music Nashville. Prior to the song's release, Evans said "I'm so excited. I feel like it's something I've been working on for the last 3 years. I met a guy—almost 2 years ago—named Chris DeStefano. We met at a writing camp in Australia and we decided that we needed to make a record together. And over the course of the last year and a half we've written a bunch of songs and one very special one, "Kiss Somebody", with a man named Josh Osborne. Two of the best dudes you’ll ever meet."

== Music video ==
The music video was directed by Jeff Venable and premiered on CMT, GAC, CMC and CMT Music in 2017.

== Critical reception ==
"Kiss Somebody" peaked at No. 53 on the ARIA Singles Chart, No. 1 on the related Hitseeker Singles, No. 16 on Digital Tracks, No. 4 on Australian Artists Singles and No. 7 on Streaming charts.

Amy McCartney from The Boot called it "an upbeat, addictively optimistic track", adding "The radio-friendly, pop-tinged song is all about spontaneous romance". Taylor Weatherby of Billboard called it "a lighthearted love song."

== Track listing ==
Digital download
No.	Title	Length
1.	"Kiss Somebody"	3:32

== Charts ==
=== Weekly charts ===
Chart (2017–2018)	Peak position
Australia (ARIA)	53
US Billboard Hot 100	53
US Hot Country Songs (Billboard)	11
US Country Airplay (Billboard)	3

=== Year-end charts ===
Chart (2018)	Position
US Country Airplay (Billboard)	19
US Hot Country Songs (Billboard)	42

== Certifications ==
Region	Certification	Certified units/sales
Australia (ARIA)	Platinum	70,000^{‡}
Canada (Music Canada)	Gold	40,000^{‡}
New Zealand (RMNZ)	Gold	15,000^{‡}
United States (RIAA)	Platinum	1,000,000^{‡}
^{‡} Sales+streaming figures based on certification alone.

== Release history ==
Region	Date	Format(s)	Label
Australia	21 July 2017	Digital download	Warner Nashville
United States	21 July 2017	Digital download	Warner Nashville
United States	23 October 2017	Country airplay	Warner Nashville
