= Big Skies =

Single by Morgan Evans

from the album Live Each Day
- Released: September 2007
- Recorded: Nashville, Tennessee
- Genre: Country
- Length: 3:55
- Label: Sony Music Australia
- Songwriter(s): Morgan Evans; Mark Wells
- Producer(s): Rod McCormack; Mark Moffatt

Morgan Evans singles chronology
"Big Skies" (2007)	"Live Each Day" (2012)

"Big Skies" is a song and debut single by Australian singer songwriter, Morgan Evans, released in September 2007, following his win at the 2007 Telstra Road to Tamworth competition.

Following his win at the Telstra Road to Tamworth, Evens flew to Nashville where he recorded his debut single and performed on an international artists showcase. "Big Skies" speaks number 1 on The Country Music Channel Chart and the Australian Country Radio Charts and peaked at number 28 on the ARIA Physical Singles Charts.

== Track listing ==
CD single (88697167862)
No.	Title	Length
1.	"Big Skies"	3:55
2.	"Wasted Love"	4:09
3.	"There's No Time"	3:49

== Charts ==
Chart (2007)	Peak position
Australia Physical Single (ARIA)	28
