= Over for You =

Single by Morgan Evans

from the EP Life Upside Down
- Released: 18 October 2022
- Recorded: 2022
- Length: 3:05
- Label: Warner Music Nashville
- Songwriter(s): Morgan Evans; Madison Love; Tim Sommers; Geoff Warburton
- Producer(s): Scott Hendricks; One Love

Morgan Evans singles chronology
"Christmas in the Sun" (2021)	"Over for You" (2022)

Music video
- "Over for You" on YouTube

"Over for You" is a song by Australian singer songwriter Morgan Evans, released on 18 October 2022.

In February 2023, Evans released an online docuseries centered around the song of the same name. Evans said, "The whole idea was to document the biggest show of my career, playing the CMC Rocks Festival in Australia and headlining it. The original focus was on the music and coming home, and that's what it's about. But it's not like I could pretend like something wasn't going on. That's the journey of what happened in that moment of my life."

At the APRA Music Awards of 2024, the song was nominated for Most Performed Country Work.

== Background ==
In 2017, Evans married fellow country singer Kelsea Ballerini following what she described as a "whirlwind romance". In August 2022, Ballerini confirmed that she had filed for divorce from Evans, with the pair settling things by October 2022.

In January 2023, Evans told American Songwriter "there was a three-month period where I didn't really write any music. The first time I sat down to write music after that was the session that 'Over for You' came out of." It was a writing session alongside Jeff Warburton, Tim Sommers and Madison Love. Evans said "I walked into the room and I sat in the corner and I said, 'I just need to tell you guys what's going on in my life because if we try to write something else, I'll be useless.'"

Evans debuted "Over for You" at the CMC Rocks QLD Festival on 22 September 2022, a week after it was written. Following the performance, Evans received requests to release it as a single, although he was initially unsure, saying he was sort of "paralysed by it a little" calling it "the most authentic thing I've ever communicated through music." A live recording was released on 7 October 2022. Evans and his band recorded the studio version at singer-songwriter, Neil Finn's Roundhead Studios in Auckland before the official release on 18 October 2022.

At the CMA Awards on 9 November 2022 Evans said, "I didn't have any expectations for it, I just felt like I needed to get it off my chest. The reaction to that was kind of overwhelming."

== Music video ==
The music video was filmed while on tour in Australia and New Zealand and was an impromptu project. The music video was directed by Peter John and released on 11 November 2022. It features an aimless Evans wandering empty streets and sunrise beaches searching for answers. Towards the end of the video, Evans is on stage, performing "Over for You" in front of his loyal fanbase.

== Track listing ==
Single version
No.	Title	Length
1.	"Over for You"	3:05

Live version
No.	Title	Length
1.	"Over for You" (live in Melbourne)	3:34

== Charts ==
Weekly chart performance for "Over for You"
Chart (2022–2023)	Peak position
Australia Countrytown Hot 50 (Radio Monitor)	3
US Country Airplay (Billboard)	42
US Hot Country Songs (Billboard)	42

== Release history ==
Release history and formats for "Over for You"
Region	Date	Format(s)	Label	Version
Australia	7 October 2022	Digital download; streaming	Warner Music Nashville	Live in Melbourne
Various	18 October 2022	Digital download; streaming; airplay	Warner Music Nashville	Single version
