= Day Drunk =

Single by Morgan Evans

from the album Morgan Evans EP and Things That We Drink To
- Released: 8 June 2018
- Genre: Country
- Length: 3:14
- Label: Warner Music Nashville
- Songwriters: Morgan Evans; Chris DeStefano; Lindy Robbins
- Producer: Chris DeStefano

Morgan Evans singles chronology
"I Do" (2018)	"Day Drunk" (2018)	"Young Again" (2019)

"Day Drunk" is a song recorded by Australian country music singer Morgan Evans, released on 8 June 2018 as the third single from his fourth EP Morgan Evans EP and second studio album Things That We Drink To. Evans told Taste of Country "I've never been the 'drinking song' guy, but this song came from a real place and is really more about spending a day with your person than it is about just going getting drunk. There's a reason why I love it so much and feel like I can sing it." "Day Drunk" peaked at number 27 on the ARIA Singles Chart. The song was written by Evans, along with Lindy Robbins and Chris DeStefano, the latter of whom produced it.

At the 2019 Country Music Awards of Australia, the song won Single of the Year.

At the APRA Music Awards of 2019, the song won Country Work of the Year.

At the ARIA Music Awards of 2019, the song was nominated for Song of the Year.

At the APRA Music Awards of 2020, "Day Drunk" was nominated for Most Performed Country Work of the Year.

== Music video ==
There are two versions of the Day Drunk music video:

1) "Hawaii Version". This music video was released on 29 June 2018. It captures Evans and wife Kelsea Ballerini enjoying waterslides, waterfalls and hours of bliss and relaxation on a recent vacation in Hawaii.

2) "Reverse Version". Directed by Colin Duffy, this video was filmed entirely in reverse in LA, and was released in August 2019. (http://www.soundslikenashville.com/music/morgan-evans-day-drunk-video-2/)

== Critical reception ==
Thomas Bleach ThomasBleach.com referred to "Day Drunk" in an album review as "playful" and "bright", and described it as having a "catchy hook".

== Track listing ==
Digital download
No.	Title	Length
1.	"Day Drunk"	3:13

== Charts ==
=== Weekly charts ===
Chart (2018–2019)	Peak position
Australia (ARIA)	27
Canada Country (Billboard)	32
US Country Airplay (Billboard)	21
US Hot Country Songs (Billboard)	29

=== Year-end charts ===
Chart (2019)	Position
Australian Artist (ARIA)	26
US Hot Country Songs (Billboard)	85

== Certifications ==
Region	Certification	Certified units/sales
Australia (ARIA)	2× Platinum	140,000^{‡}
Canada (Music Canada)	Gold	40,000^{‡}
New Zealand (RMNZ)	Gold	15,000^{‡}
^{‡} Sales+streaming figures based on certification alone.

== Release history ==
Region	Date	Format(s)	Label
Australia	8 June 2018	Digital download	Warner Nashville
United States	24 September 2018	Country airplay	Warner Nashville
