= Young Again (Morgan Evans song) =

Single by Morgan Evans

from the album Morgan Evans EP and Things That We Drink To
- Released: May 2019
- Genre: Country
- Length: 2:55
- Label: Warner Music Nashville
- Songwriters: Morgan Evans; Chris DeStefano; Josh Kear
- Producer: Chris DeStefano

Morgan Evans singles chronology
| "Day Drunk" (2018) | "Young Again" (2019) | "Diamonds" (2019) |

"Young Again" is a song by Australian singer songwriter Morgan Evans, released to Australian contemporary hit radio in May 2019 as the fourth single from his fourth EP Morgan Evans EP and second studio album Things That We Drink To. On the single, Morgan said "'Young Again' is a special one because I feel like it's definitely one of those songs that I just want to play over and over at the live show and I finish the show every night with it but it's also that feeling that I try to wake up every day and live in the moment and take the opportunity for the life that you have right in front of you." He added "The line is we will never be this young again and it's so true. It's as true when I wrote the song on a mandolin and it's as true when I sing it to a festival crowd in the UK or a festival crowd in Oklahoma or whether I'm just listening to it as I drive around and making sure the mixes are right."

On 1 July 2019, Morgan performed the song on The Voice Australia and "Young Again" peaked at number 77 on the ARIA Singles Chart the following week.

At the APRA Music Awards of 2020, "Young Again" won the Most Performed Country Work of the Year.

== Music video ==
The music video was directed by and released on 29 June 2019.

== Critical reception ==
Shania Twang from Triple M called the song "feel-good".

== Charts ==
| Chart (2019) | Peak position |
|---|---|
| Australia (ARIA Charts) | 77 |

== Release history ==
| Region | Date | Format(s) | Label |
|---|---|---|---|
| Australia | May 2019 | Contemporary Hit Radio | Warner Australasia |
