= Chris DeStefano =

American singer/songwriter, record producer and multi instrumentalist

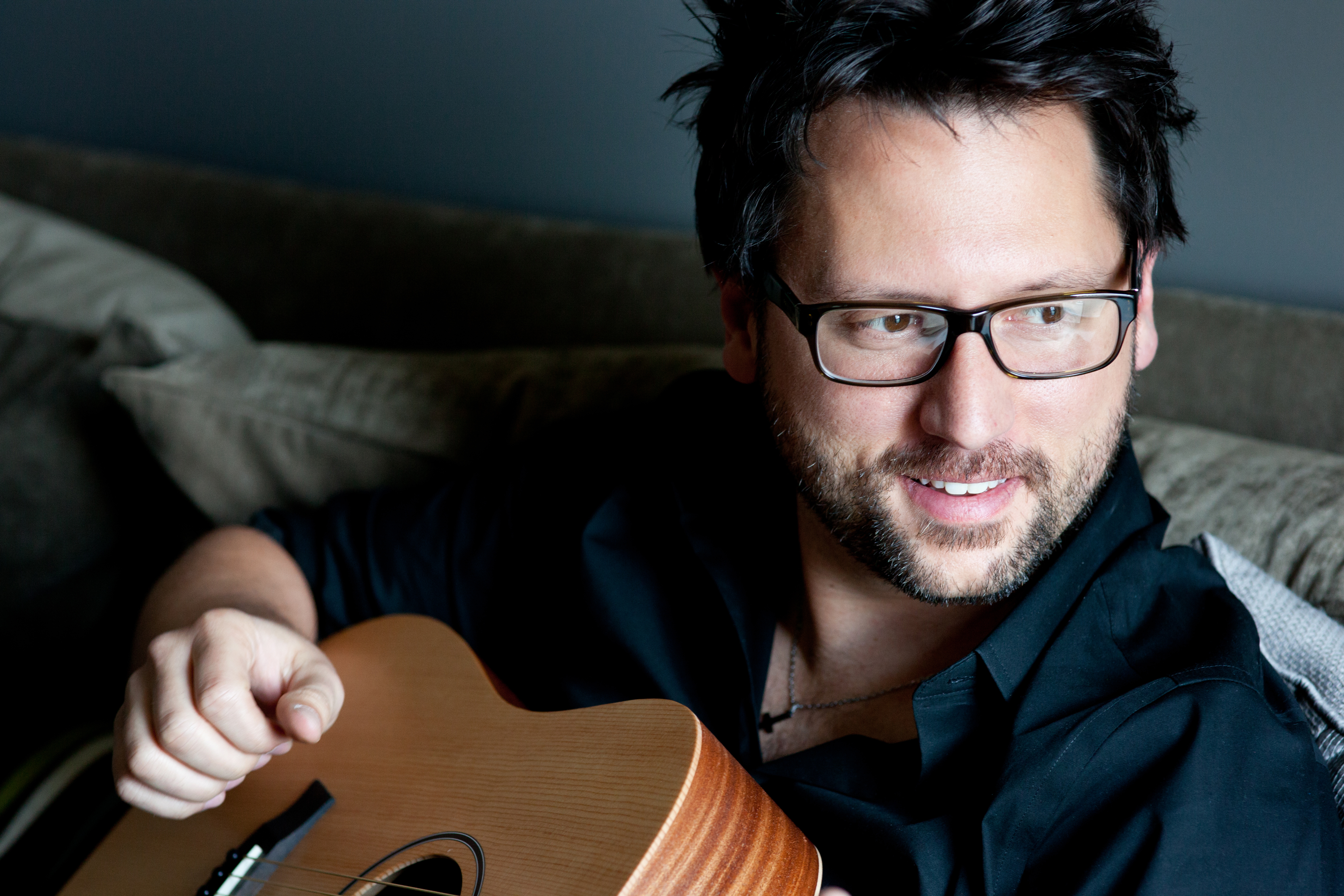

Background information
- Birth name: Christopher Michael DeStefano
- Origin: Nashville, Tennessee, U.S.
- Genres: Country, pop, pop rock
- Occupation(s): Songwriter, record producer
- Instruments: Vocals; guitar; piano; bass; drums; mandolin; banjo; violin; pedal steel; percussion
- Years active: 2010–present

Christopher Michael DeStefano is a Grammy Award-winning American singer/songwriter, record producer, and multi-instrumentalist currently living in Nashville. As a songwriter, he has multiple #1 songs with artists Carrie Underwood (“Good Girl”, "Little Toy Guns"), Billy Currington (“Hey Girl”), Brett Eldredge ("Don't Ya"), Luke Bryan ("That's My Kind of Night", "Kick the Dust Up" ), Miranda Lambert & Carrie Underwood ("Somethin' Bad," later reworked as the opening theme for NBC Sunday Night Football), Rascal Flatts ("Rewind") and Jason Aldean ("Just Gettin' Started").

DeStefano was raised in Mount Laurel, New Jersey and graduated from Lenape High School in 1993. He was in the school's music program while playing with a progressive rock band in the area.

Underwood's "Good Girl", which DeStefano co-wrote, reached number 1 on Hot Country Songs in 2012. He also co-wrote and produced Brett Eldredge's number 1 single "Don't Ya". He co-wrote “Something in the Water” sung by Carrie Underwood which was the #1 song for seven weeks, the 3rd longest running female #1 Hot Country song in chart history. DeStefano co-wrote "Kiss Somebody" (July 2017) with Australian singer, Morgan Evans, and fellow American songwriter, Josh Osborne. At the APRA Music Awards of 2018 the song and its writers won Country Work of the Year.

== Discography ==
=== Songwriting discography ===
Year	Artist	Album	Song	Co-written with
2010	David Archuleta	The Other Side of Down	"Something 'Bout Love"	David Archuleta, Sam Hollander, Dave Katz
2011	Kelly Clarkson	Stronger	"Let Me Down"	Kelly Clarkson
2011	David Cook	This Loud Morning	"This Is Not The Last Time"	David Cook, David Hodges
2011	Eli Young Band	Life at Best	"Every Other Memory"	Catt Gravitt, Josh Kear
2011	Scotty McCreery	Clear as Day	"Better Than That"	Jess Cates, Craig Wiseman
2012	Kris Allen	Thank You Camellia	"Turn the Pages"	Kris Allen, Jess Cates, Lindy Robbins
2012	Kris Allen	Thank You Camellia	"Shut That Door"	Kris Allen, Jess Cates
2012	Connie Britton	The Music of Nashville: Season 1 Volume 1	"Buried Under"	Natalie Hemby
2012	Jana Kramer	Jana Kramer	"Why Ya Wanna"	Catt Gravitt, Ashley Gorley
2012	Haley Reinhart	Listen Up!	"Now That You're Here"	Haley Reinhart, Sam Watters
2012	Carrie Underwood	Blown Away	"Good Girl"	Carrie Underwood, Ashley Gorley
2013	Lauren Alaina	—	"Barefoot and Buckwild"	Lauren Alaina, Jon Nite
2013	Big Time Rush	24/Seven	"Picture This"	Carlos Pena Jr., James Maslow, Ashley Gorley
2013	Big Time Rush	24/Seven	"Just Getting Started"	Kendall Schmidt, Logan Henderson, Ashley Gorley
2013	Big Time Rush	24/Seven	"Lost in Love" (feat. Jake Miller)	Carlos Pena Jr., Jake Miller, Shari Short
2013	Big Time Rush	24/Seven	"Na Na Na"	Carlos Pena Jr., Ashley Gorley
2013	Luke Bryan	Crash My Party	"That's My Kind of Night"	Dallas Davidson, Ashley Gorley
2013	Billy Currington	We Are Tonight	“Hey Girl”	Rhett Akins, Ashley Gorley
2013	Gavin DeGraw	Make a Move	"Heartbreak"	Gavin DeGraw
2013	Brett Eldredge	Bring You Back	"Don't Ya"	Brett Eldredge, Ashley Gorley
2013	Florida Georgia Line	Here's to the Good Times	"Take It Out on Me"	Ashley Gorley, Shane McAnally
2013	Jake Owen	Days of Gold	"Ghost Town"	Ashley Gorley, Shane McAnally
2013	Jake Owen	Days of Gold	"Life of the Party"	Ashley Gorley, Dallas Davidson
2013	Chris Young	A.M.	"Aw Naw"	Chris Young, Ashley Gorley
2013	Chris Young	A.M.	"A.M."	Chris Young, Ashley Gorley
2013	Chris Young	A.M.	"Goodbye"	Chris Young, Ashley Gorley
2013	Chris Young	A.M.	"We're Gonna Find It Tonight"	Chris Young, Rhett Akins
2014	Jason Aldean	Old Boots, New Dirt	"Just Gettin' Started"	Rhett Akins, Ashley Gorley
2014	Dan + Shay	Where It All Began	"Nothin' Like You"	Ashley Gorley, Dan Smyers, Shay Mooney
2014	Florida Georgia Line	Anything Goes	"Smile"	Dallas Davidson, Ashley Gorley
2014	Florida Georgia Line	Anything Goes	"Every Night"	Tyler Hubbard, Tyler Kelley, Ashley Gorley
2014	Lucy Hale	Road Between	"Kiss Me"	Mike Daly, Ashley Gorley, Lindy Robbins
2014	Lucy Hale	Road Between	"Lie a Little Better"	Mike Daly, Melissa Peirce
2014	Lucy Hale	Road Between	"That's What I Call Crazy"	Ashley Gorley, Kacey Musgraves
2014	Miranda Lambert	Platinum	"Somethin' Bad" (duet with Carrie Underwood)	Brett James, Priscilla Renea
2014	Rascal Flatts	Rewind	"Rewind"	Ashley Gorley, Eric Paslay
2014	Cole Swindell	Cole Swindell	"Swayin'"	Rhett Akins, Ashley Gorley
2014	Chase Rice	Ignite the Night	"Ready Set Roll"	Chase Rice, Rhett Akins
2014	Chase Rice	Ignite the Night	"Do It Like This"	Dallas Davidson, Ashley Gorley
2014	Chase Rice	Ignite the Night	"Beach Town"	Chase Rice, Jon Nite
2014	Chase Rice	Ignite the Night	"Beer With The Boys"	Chase Rice, Ashley Gorley
2014	Chase Rice	Ignite the Night	"We Goin' Out"	Chase Rice, Shane Minor
2014	Chase Rice	Ignite the Night	"50 Shades Of Crazy"	Chase Rice, Jon Nite
2014	Chase Rice	Ignite the Night	"Best Beers Of Our Lives"	Chase Rice, Shane Minor
2014	Carrie Underwood	Greatest Hits: Decade #1	"Something in the Water"	Carrie Underwood, Brett James
2014	Carrie Underwood	Greatest Hits: Decade #1	"Little Toy Guns"	Carrie Underwood, Hillary Lindsey
2015	Bon Jovi	Burning Bridges	"Life Is Beautiful"	Jon Bon Jovi, Billy Falcon
2015	Luke Bryan	Kill the Lights	"Kick the Dust Up"	Dallas Davidson, Ashley Gorley
2015	Kelly Clarkson	Piece by Piece	"Second Wind"	Shane McAnally, Maren Morris
2015	Thomas Rhett	Tangled Up	"Tangled"	Adam Hoffman, Matt Lipkins, Josh Osborne, Scott Schwartz
2015	Carrie Underwood	Storyteller	"Renegade Runaway"	Carrie Underwood, Hillary Lindsey
2015	Carrie Underwood	Storyteller	"Smoke Break"	Carrie Underwood, Hillary Lindsey
2015	Carrie Underwood	Storyteller	"Clock Don't Stop"	Hillary Lindsey, Blair Daly
2016	Dan + Shay	Obsessed	"From the Ground Up"	Dan Smyers, Shay Mooney
2016	Rachel Platten	Wildfire	"Superman"	Rachel Platten, Lindy Robbins
2016	Bon Jovi	This House Is Not for Sale	"Roller Coaster"	Jon Bon Jovi, Ashley Gorley
2017	Jerrod Niemann	This Ride	"Zero to Crazy"	Ashley Gorley, Shane McAnally
2017	Jerrod Niemann	This Ride	"Out of My Heart"	Ashley Gorley, Dallas Davidson
2017	Thomas Rhett	Life Changes	"Grave"	Hillary Lindsey, Josh Miller
2017	Chase Rice	Lambs & Lions	"Lions"	Chase Rice, Ashley Gorley
2017	Chase Rice	Lambs & Lions	"Eyes on You"	Chase Rice, Ashley Gorley
2017	Chase Rice	Lambs & Lions	"Jack Daniel's Showed Up"	Chase Rice, Ashley Gorley
2017	Chase Rice	Lambs & Lions	"25 Wexford St."	Chase Rice, Jim Beavers
2017	Chris Young	Losing Sleep	"Losing Sleep"	Josh Hoge
2018	Morgan Evans	Things That We Drink To	"American"	Morgan Evans, Josh Osborne
2018	Morgan Evans	Things That We Drink To	"Kiss Somebody"	Morgan Evans, Josh Osborne
2018	Morgan Evans	Things That We Drink To	"I Do"	Morgan Evans, Ashley Gorley
2018	Morgan Evans	Things That We Drink To	"Song for the Summer"	Morgan Evans, David Hodges
2018	Morgan Evans	Things That We Drink To	"Day Drunk"	Morgan Evans, Lindy Robbins
2018	Morgan Evans	Things That We Drink To	"Dance With Me" (feat. Kelsea Ballerini)	Morgan Evans
2018	Morgan Evans	Things That We Drink To	"Me On You"	Morgan Evans, Josh Osborne
2018	Morgan Evans	Things That We Drink To	"Things That We Drink To"	Morgan Evans, Josh Osborne
2018	Morgan Evans	Things That We Drink To	"We Dream"	Morgan Evans, Jaren Johnston, Jon Nite
2018	Morgan Evans	Things That We Drink To	"Everything Changes"	Morgan Evans, Blair Daily
2018	Morgan Evans	Things That We Drink To	"Young Again"	Morgan Evans, Josh Kear
2018	Carrie Underwood	NBC Sunday Night Football	"Game On"	Carrie Underwood, Brett James
2019	Noah Kahan	Busyhead	"False Confidence"	Noah Kahan
2019	Lady A	Ocean	"Mansion"	Hillary Lindsey, Josh Miller
2019	LoCash	Brothers	"Cold Beer Kind of Night"	Ashley Gorley, Rhett Akins
2019	Jake Owen	Greetings from... Jake	"Mexico in Our Minds"	Jaren Johnston, Ashley Gorley
2019	Runaway June	Blue Roses	"Trouble with This Town"	Naomi Cook, Jennifer Wayne, Liz Rose
2020	Lee Brice	Hey World	"Don't Need No Reason"	Lee Brice, Kyle Jacobs
2021	Callista Clark	Real to Me (EP)	"Heartbreak Song"	Callista Clark, Emily Shackleton, Liz Rose
2021	Chase Rice	The Album	"Best Night Ever"	Chase Rice, Matt Jenkins
2021	Chase Rice	The Album	"Belong"	Chase Rice, Jon Nite
2021	Mitchell Tenpenny	Midnight Diaries (EP)	"Bucket List"	Mitchell Tenpenny, Laura Veltz
2021	Tanner Adell	Honky Tonk Heartbreak	"Honky Tonk Heartbreak"	JT Harding, Tanner Adell
2021	Carrie Underwood	My Gift	"Favorite Time of the Year"	Carrie Underwood, Hillary Lindsey
2021	Chris Young	Famous Friends	"Break Like You Do"	Chris Young, Matt Rogers, Anthony Smith
2021	Chris Young	Famous Friends	"At the End of a Bar" (feat. Mitchell Tenpenny)	Chris Young, Mitchell Tenpenny
2021	Chris Young	Famous Friends	"Love Looks Good on You"	Chris Young
2021	Chris Young	Famous Friends	"One of Them Nights"	Chris Young, Rhett Atkins
2021	Chris Young	Famous Friends	"When You're Drinking"	Chris Young, Matt Rogers, Anthony Smith
2021	Chris Young	Famous Friends	"Everybody Needs a Song" (feat. Old Dominion)	Chris Young, Brad Tursi
2022	Randy Houser	Note to Self	"Out and Down"	Randy Houser, Matt Rogers
2022	Mitchell Tenpenny	This Is the Heavy	"Do You"	Mitchell Tenpenny, Claire Douglas, Michael Whitworth
2022	Mitchell Tenpenny	This Is the Heavy	"Bucket Lost"	Mitchell Tenpenny, Laura Veltz
2022	Carrie Underwood	Denim & Rhinestones	"Poor Everybody Else"	Carrie Underwood, Josh Miller
2023	Chris Janson	The Outlaw Side of Me	"Outlaw Side of Me"	Chris Janson, Lee Thomas Miller
2023	Kip Moore	Damn Love	"Silver & Gold"	Kip Moore, Dan Couch
2023	Jason Mraz	Mystical Magical Rhythmical Radical Ride	"I Feel Like Dancing"	Jason Mraz, Mai Bloomfield, Abby Dorsey, Rebecca Gebhart, Stephanie Jones, Chaska Potter, Mona Tavakoli, Eg White
2024	Chris Young	Young Love & Saturday Nights	"Looking for You"	Chris Young, James McNair, Emily Weisband
2024	Chris Young	Young Love & Saturday Nights	"Don't Call Me"	Chris Young, Ashley Gorley
2024	Chris Young	Young Love & Saturday Nights	"Country Boy's Prayer"	Chris Young, Mitchell Tenpenny, Michael Whitworth
2024	Chris Young	Young Love & Saturday Nights	"Call It a Day"	Chris Young, Emily Weisband, Jon Nite
2024	Chris Young	Young Love & Saturday Nights	"Drink to Remember"	Chris Young, Corey Crowder
2024	Chris Young	Young Love & Saturday Nights	"Fall Out"	Chris Young, Emily Weisband, Jon Nite
2024	Chris Young	Young Love & Saturday Nights	"Fire"	Chris Young, Hardy
2024	Chris Young	Young Love & Saturday Nights	"Right Now"	Chris Young, Josh Hoge, Paul DiGiovanni
2024	MacKenzie Porter	"Walk Away"	Nobody's Born with a Broken Heart	MacKenzie Porter, Jon Nite

=== Production discography ===
Year	Artist	Album	Song	Co-produced with
2010	David Archuleta	The Other Side of Down	"Something 'Bout Love"	S*A*M and Sluggo
2011	Kelly Clarkson	Stronger	"Let Me Down"	—
2011	Kelly Clarkson	Stronger	"Don't Be a Girl About It"	—
2012	Kris Allen	Thank You Camellia	"Turn the Pages"	—
2012	Haley Reinhart	Listen Up!	"Now That You're Here"	—
2013	Big Time Rush	24/Seven	"Picture This"	Damon Sharpe
2013	Big Time Rush	24/Seven	"Just Getting Started"	Damon Sharpe
2013	Big Time Rush	24/Seven	"Lost in Love"	Damon Sharpe
2013	Big Time Rush	24/Seven	"NaNaNa"	Damon Sharpe
2013	Brett Eldredge	Bring You Back	"Don't Ya"	
2014	Chase Rice	Ignite the Night	"Ready Set Roll"	
2014	Chase Rice	Ignite the Night	"Do It Like This"	
2014	Chase Rice	Ignite the Night	"Beach Town"	
2014	Chase Rice	Ignite the Night	"Beer With The Boys"	
2014	Chase Rice	Ignite the Night	"We Goin’ Out"	
2014	Chase Rice	Ignite the Night	"50 Shades of Crazy"	
2014	Chase Rice	Ignite the Night	"Best Beers of Our Lives"	
2014	Chase Rice	Ignite the Night	"Mmm Girl"	
2014	Chase Rice	Ignite the Night	"Carolina Can"	
2014	Chase Rice	Ignite the Night	"Gonna Wanna Tonight"	
2014	Chase Rice	Ignite the Night	"U Turn"	
2014	Chase Rice	Ignite the Night	"What’s Your Name"	
2014	Chase Rice	Ignite the Night	"Country In Ya"	
2014	Chase Rice	Ignite the Night	"Ride"	
2014	Dan + Shay	Where It All Began	"Nothin' Like You"	
2015	Kelly Clarkson	Piece by Piece	"Second Wind"	
2015	Kip Moore	Wild Ones	"Wild Ones"	
2015	Kip Moore	Wild Ones	"Complicated"	
2015	Thomas Rhett	Tangled Up	"Learned It from the Radio"	—
2015	Thomas Rhett	Tangled Up	"Playing with Fire" (featuring Jordin Sparks)"	—
2017	Chase Rice	Lambs & Lions	"Lions"	—
2017	Chase Rice	Lambs & Lions	"On Tonight"	—
2017	Chase Rice	Lambs & Lions	"Unforgettable"	—
2017	Chase Rice	Lambs & Lions	"Eyes on You"	Jacquire King
2017	Chase Rice	Lambs & Lions	"Jack Daniel's Showed Up"	—
2017	Chase Rice	Lambs & Lions	"This Cowboy's Hat" (feat. Ned LeDoux)	—
2018	Morgan Evans	Things That We Drink To	All 11 tracks	—
2018	Carrie Underwood	NBC Sunday Night Football	"Game On"	Mark Bright
2021	Chase Rice	The Album	"Lonely If You Are"	Chase Rice
2021	Chase Rice	The Album	"Best Night Ever"	Chase Rice
2021	Chase Rice	The Album	"Messy"	Chase Rice
2021	Chase Rice	The Album	"In the Car"	Chase Rice
2021	Chase Rice	The Album	"You"	—
2021	Chase Rice	The Album	"Break. Up. Down"	—
2021	Chase Rice	The Album	"Down Home Runs Deep"	—
2021	Chase Rice	The Album	"Belong"	—
2021	Chris Young	Famous Friends	"Break Like You Do"	Chris Young
2021	Chris Young	Famous Friends	"At the End of a Bar"	Chris Young
2021	Chris Young	Famous Friends	"Love Looks Good on You"	Chris Young
2021	Chris Young	Famous Friends	"One of Them Nights"	Chris Young
2021	Tanner Adell	Honky Tonk Heartbreak	"Honky Tonk Heartbreak"	—
2024	Chris Young	Young Love & Saturday Nights	"Looking for You"	—
2024	Chris Young	Young Love & Saturday Nights	"Young Love & Saturday Nights"	Chris Young, Corey Crowder
2024	Chris Young	Young Love & Saturday Nights	"Don't Call Me"	Chris Young
2024	Chris Young	Young Love & Saturday Nights	"Country Boy's Prayer"	Chris Young
2024	Chris Young	Young Love & Saturday Nights	"Call It a Day"	Chris Young
2024	Chris Young	Young Love & Saturday Nights	"Don't Stop Now"	Chris Young, Corey Crowder
2024	Chris Young	Young Love & Saturday Nights	"Fall Out"	Chris Young
2024	Chris Young	Young Love & Saturday Nights	"Fire"	Chris Young
2024	Chris Young	Young Love & Saturday Nights	"Right Now"	Chris Young
2024	Chris Young	Young Love & Saturday Nights	"Million Miles"	Chris Young, Corey Crowder
2024	Chris Young	Young Love & Saturday Nights	"Everybody Grew Up"	Chris Young, Corey Crowder
2024	Chris Young	Young Love & Saturday Nights	"Knee Deep in Neon"	Chris Young
2024	Chris Young	Young Love & Saturday Nights	"Down"	Chris Young
