= Morgan Evans (singer) =

Australian singer-songwriter (born 1985)

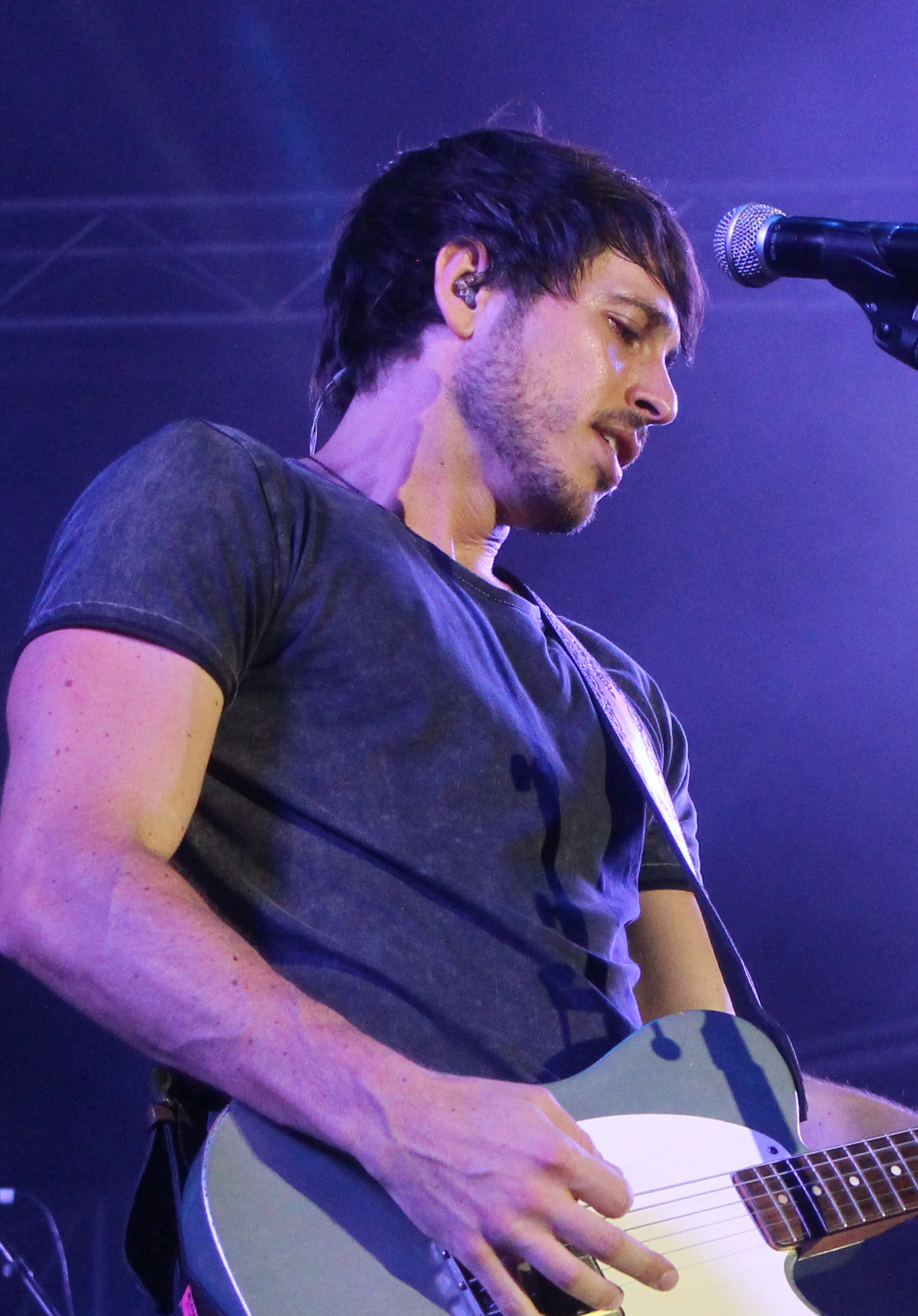
- Evans in 2016

Background information
- Born: Morgan John Evans; 24 April 1985 (age 41); Newcastle, New South Wales, Australia
- Genres: Country, indie rock (early)
- Occupation: Singer-songwriter
- Instruments: Vocals; guitar
- Years active: 2002–present
- Labels: Sony BMG; Warner Australasia; Warner Nashville; Virgin
- Formerly of: Solver
- Spouse: Kelsea Ballerini (m. 2017; div. 2022)
- Website: morganevansmusic.com

Morgan John Evans (born 24 April 1985) is an Australian country music singer and songwriter, known for his heartfelt lyrics and dynamic performances. He first gained recognition with his self-titled debut album in 2014, which peaked at number 20 on the ARIA Albums Chart. International success followed with his 2017 hit "Kiss Somebody" and his 2018 album "Things That We Drink To", which won the ARIA Award for Best Country Album in 2019. Evans' music, featuring chart-topping singles and emotionally raw songwriting, has resonated with fans globally, amassing over 800 million streams. His 2022 Life Upside Down EP, written during a period of personal upheaval, highlighted his vulnerability, with tracks like "Over for You" going viral.

== Life and career ==
=== 1985–2010: Early life and career ===
Evans was born on 24 April 1985 in Newcastle, New South Wales. He has a younger sister, Jane, and a younger brother, Tom, who is also a musician playing bass guitar. At the age of 13, Evans performed his first gig. While attending Warners Bay High School he was in a local rock trio, Extortion, which won a state high school band competition, Youthrock, in 2002. Extortion were later renamed Solver. As of 2006, Evans provided lead vocals and guitar in the group, his brother Tom was on bass guitar and a friend, Nicholas Cook, was the drummer. The band won Artist of the Year and Best Rock Act at the MusicOZ Awards of 2006.

In 2007, Evans won the Road to Tamworth competition and for his prize he flew to Nashville to record a single. He was signed to Sony BMG and released his debut single "Big Skies", in September 2007. The title track received airplay on Australian country music radio stations.

Evans toured with Brooks & Dunn, Gary Allan, Shannon Noll, Adam Harvey and was personally selected by Taylor Swift to open for her first Australian tour.

=== 2012–2016: Debut studio album ===
In January 2012, Evans released his debut EP, Live Each Day, through Warner Music Australasia. This was followed in August that year by a second EP, While We're Young. He was named the New Oz Artist of the Year at the 2013 CMC Music Awards.

Evans released a self-titled debut studio album in March 2014, which peaked at number 20 on the ARIA Albums Chart. At the 2014 CMC Music Awards he won the Oz Artist of the Year, Male Artist of the Year and Best Australian Video of the Year. His track, "Like a Tornado", was short-listed for the Vanda and Young Songwriting Competition of 2014.

He hosted the CMC Music Awards for three consecutive years, from 2015 to 2017. He is the 2016 Country Music Association Global Artist of the Year and has won five fan voted Country Music Channel Awards, including Male Artist of the Year.

=== 2017–2020: Things That We Drink To ===
Following his relocation to Nashville, Evans signed with Warner Music Nashville in May 2017, which led to the release of his debut US single, "Kiss Somebody".

Evans released a single, "I Do", on 8 December 2017. He explained via Instagram that he had "written it about my girlfriend, recorded it about my fiancée, releasing it about my wife" Kelsea Ballerini, whom he married on 2 December 2017 in Mexico. In August, Evans released his third EP titled, Morgan Evans EP. Evan's second studio album, Things That We Drink To, was released in October 2018.

On 8 November 2019, Evans released the single "Diamonds" which he said is a love song written for Ballerini. At the global APRA Awards in March 2020, Evans won Outstanding International Achievement Award.

=== 2021–2024: The Country and the Coast and Life Upside Down + Live at the Sydney Opera House ===
In September 2021, Evans announced the release of the EP The Country and the Coast (Side A).

In September 2022, Evans performed a new song titled "Over for You" at the CMC Rocks QLD Festival. The song was written in response to Evans' divorce from Ballerini, and the heartbreak he experienced. Evans later shared on his Instagram that the song had been written only three weeks earlier and the show performance was only the second time he had played the song. A studio version of "Over for You" was released on 17 October 2022.

In April 2023, Evans released his Life Upside Down EP. The EP features five tracks that showcase Evans' path to finding a light in the dark. Evans described the release as a "journey through unexpected heartbreak, self-rediscovery, new beginnings and a newfound gratitude for the present moment." Additionally, Evans returned to Australia for two sold-out performances at the iconic Sydney Opera House.

In April 2024, Evans released his first live album, titled Live at the Sydney Opera House.

=== 2025: signing with Virgin and Steel Town ===
In September 2025, Evans announced he had signed with Virgin Music Group, with the first single "Beer Back Home" released on 10 October 2025 and a studio album Steel Town, released in March 2026.

=== 2027: Australian Idol ===
In August 2026, Evans was announced as a new judge on reality singing competition Australian Idol, replacing Kyle Sandilands after his exit in July 2026.

== Discography ==
- Morgan Evans (2014)
- Things That We Drink To (2018)
- Steel Town (2026)

== Awards and nominations ==
=== ARIA Music Awards ===
The ARIA Music Awards is an annual award ceremony event celebrating the Australian music industry. Evens has won a trophy from two nominations.

Year	Nominee / work	Award	Result	Ref.
2019	Things That We Drink To	Best Country Album	Won	
2019	"Day Drunk"	Song of the Year	Nominated	
2026	Steel Town	Best Country Album	Nominated	

=== APRA Awards ===
Since 1982 the APRA Awards are run by Australian Performing Right Association to recognise songwriting skills, sales and airplay performance by its members annually.

Year	Nominee / work	Award	Result	Ref.
2018	Country Work of the Year	"Kiss Somebody"	Won	
2019	Country Work of the Year	"I Do"	Nominated	
2019	Country Work of the Year	"Day Drunk"	Won	
2020	Most Performed Country Work	"Young Again" (Evans, Chris DeStefano, Joshua Kear)	Won	
2021	Most Performed Country Work	"Diamonds" (Evans, Evan Bogart, DeStefano)	Won	
2023	Most Performed Country Work	"Love Is Real" (Evans, Parker Nohe, Jordan Reynolds)	Nominated	
2024	Most Performed Country Work	"Over for You" (Evans, Madison Love, Tim Sommers, Geoffrey Warburton)	Nominated	
2025	Most Performed Country Work	"Mayday" by Casey Barnes (Casey Barnes, Danielle Blakey, Morgan Evans)	Nominated	

=== Country Music Awards of Australia ===
The Country Music Awards of Australia (CMAA) (also known as the Golden Guitar Awards) is an annual awards night held in January during the Tamworth Country Music Festival, celebrating recording excellence in the Australian country music industry. They have been held annually since 1973.

Year	Nominee / work	Award	Result	Ref.
2018	Kiss Somebody	Single of the Year	Nominated	
2019	"Day Drunk"	Single of the Year	Won	
2019	"Day Drunk"	Song of the Year	Nominated	
2019	"Kiss Somebody" (Director: Jeff Venable)	Video of the Year	Nominated	
2020	Things We Drink To	Contemporary Country Album of the Year	Won	
2020	Things We Drink To	Album of the Year	Nominated	
2020	Morgan Evans for Things We Drink To	Male Artist of the Year	Won	
2020	"Young Again"	Single of the Year	Nominated	
2021	"Diamonds"	Video of the Year	Nominated	
2022	(unknown)	(unknown)	Nominated	
2023	"Sing Along Drink Along"	Single of the Year	Nominated	
2023	Morgan Evans	Male Artist of the Year	Nominated	
2026	"Back in the Day" by James Johnston (James Johnston and Morgan Evans)	Song of the Year	Nominated	
2027	"Two Broken Hearts" (with Laci Kaye Booth)	Vocal Collaboration of the Year	Pending	
2027	Morgan Evans	Male Artist of the Year	Pending	
2027	"One More" by James Johnston (James Johnston and Morgan Evans)	Song of the Year	Pending	
2027	Steel Town	Contemporary Country Album of the Year	Pending	
2027	Steel Town	Album of the Year	Pending	

=== CMA (America) Awards ===
The Country Music Association Awards (America) are the premier country music awards show which is held in Nashville every year. Winners and nominees are chosen for by members of the Country Music Association.

Year	Nominee / work	Award	Result
2014	Himself	Global Country Artist Award	Won

=== CMC Awards ===
The CMC Awards are awarded annually by Country Music Channel Australia.

Year	Nominee / work	Award	Result
2013	Himself	New Oz Artist of the Year	Won
2014	Himself	Oz Artist of the Year	Won
2014	Himself	Male Artist of the Year	Won
2014	"Carry On"	Australian Video of the Year	Won
2015	Himself	Male Artist of the Year	Won
2018	Himself	Male Artist of the Year	Nominated
2018	Himself	Australian Artist of the Year	Nominated

=== ASTRA Awards ===
The Australian Subscription Television and Radio Association awarded 'Excellence in subscription television in production, programming and talent' from 2003–15.

Year	Nominee / work	Award	Result
2015	Himself	Most Outstanding New Talent	Nominated
