= List of songs recorded by Carrie Underwood =

Songs by American singer

Songs recorded by Carrie Underwood
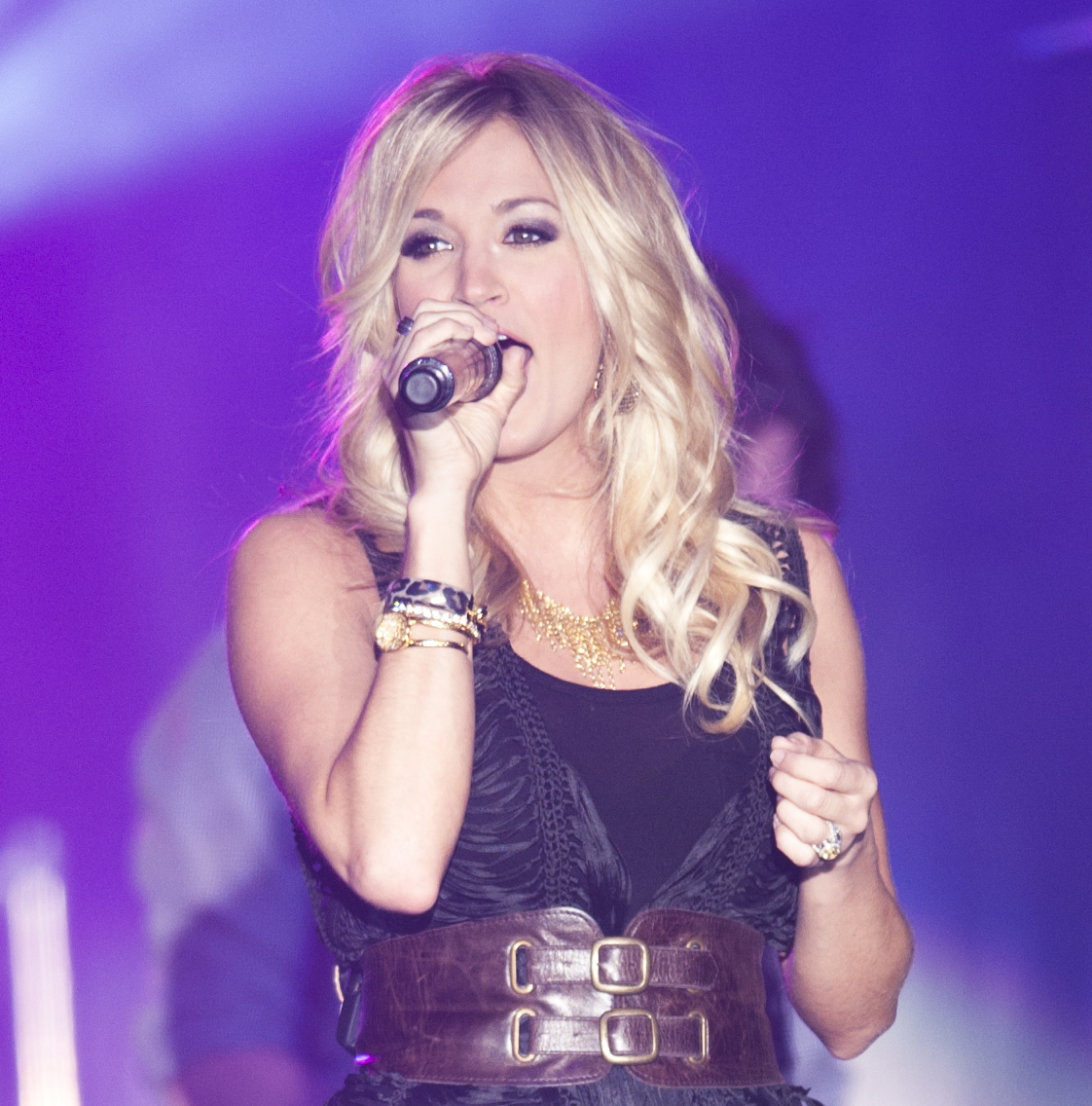
- Underwood performing in 2011
- Released songs: 168

This is a complete list of songs by American country singer Carrie Underwood.

== A ==
Song	Writer	Album	Year
"All American Girl"	Underwood, Ashley Gorley, Kelley Lovelace	Carnival Ride	2007
"All Is Well" (with Michael W. Smith and solo)	Wayne Kirkpatrick, Michael W. Smith	The Spirit of Christmas	2014
"All Is Well" (with Michael W. Smith and solo)	Wayne Kirkpatrick, Michael W. Smith	My Gift (Special Edition)	2021
"Alone" (with Heart)	Tom Kelly, Billy Steinberg	Live in Atlantic City	2019
"Always on My Mind" (with Willie Nelson)	Wayne Carson, Mark James, Johnny Christopher	To All the Girls...	2013
Amazing Grace"	John Newton	My Savior	2021
"Away in a Manger"	James Ramsey Murray, Martin Luther	My Gift	2020

== B ==
Song	Writer	Album	Year
"Backsliding"	Underwood, Hillary Lindsey, David Garcia	Cry Pretty	2018
"Barracuda" (with Heart, Jerry Cantrell, Dave Navarro, Duff McKagan, Rufus Wainwright and Gretchen Wilson)	Ann Wilson, Nancy Wilson, Michael Derosier, Roger Fisher	Live in Atlantic City	2019
"Because He Lives"	Bill Gaither, Gloria Gaither	My Savior	2021
"Before He Cheats"	Josh Kear, Chris Tompkins	Some Hearts	2005
"Blessed Assurance"	Fanny Crosby, Phoebe Knapp	My Savior	2021
"Blown Away"	Josh Kear, Chris Tompkins	Blown Away	2012
"The Bullet"	Marc Beeson, Andy Albert, Allen Shamblin	Cry Pretty	2018
"Burn"	Underwood, Hillary Lindsey, David Garcia, Ashley Gorley	Denim & Rhinestones	2022

== C ==
Song	Writer	Album	Year
"Can't Stop Lovin' You" (with Aerosmith)	Steven Tyler, Marti Frederiksen	Music from Another Dimension!	2012
"The Champion" (featuring Ludacris)	Underwood, Christopher Bridges, Brett James, Chris DeStefano	Cry Pretty	2018
"Change"	Katrina Elam, Josh Kear, Chris Tompkins	Play On	2009
"Chaser"	Underwood, Hillary Lindsey, Mike Elizondo	Storyteller	2015
"Choctaw County Affair"	Jason White	Storyteller	2015
"Church Bells"	Hillary Lindsey, Zach Crowell, Brett James	Storyteller	2015
"Clock Don't Stop"	Chris DeStefano, Hillary Lindsey, Blair Daly	Storyteller	2015
"Cowboy Casanova"	Underwood, Mike Elizondo, Brett James	Play On	2009
"Crazy Angels"	Underwood, David Garcia, Lydia Vaughan	Denin & Rhinestone	2022
"Crazy Dreams"	Underwood, George Barry Dean, Troy Verges	Carnival Ride	2007
"Cry Pretty"	Underwood, Hillary Lindsey, Lori McKenna, Liz Rose	Cry Pretty	2018
"Cupid's Got a Shotgun"	Underwood, Chris Tompkins, Josh Kear	Blown Away	2012

== D ==
Song	Writer	Album	Year
"Damage"	Underwood, David Garcia, Hillary Lindsey	Denim & Rhinestones (Deluxe Edition)	2023
"Denim & Rhinestones"	Underwood, Hillary Lindsey, Josh Kear, David Garcia	Denim & Rhinestones	2022
"Dirty Laundry"	Hillary Lindsey, Zach Crowell, Ashley Gorley	Storyteller	2015
"Do-Re-Mi" (with Ariane Rinehart, Michael Nigro, Ella Watts-Gorman, Joe West, Sophia Caruso, Grace Rundhaug & Peyton Ell)	Rodgers and Hammerstein	The Sound of Music: Music from the NBC Television Event	2013
"Do-Re-Mi" (Reprise) (with Stephen Moyer, Ariane Rinehart, Michael Nigro, Ella Watts-Gorman, Joe West, Sophia Caruso, Grace Rundhaug & Peyton Ell)	Rodgers and Hammerstein	The Sound of Music: Music from the NBC Television Event	2013
"Do You Hear What I Hear"	Gloria Shayne Baker, Noël Regney	Carnival Ride (Walmart Holiday Edition Bonus Disc)	2008
"Do You Think About Me"	Cary Barlowe, Hillary Lindsey, Shane Stevens	Blown Away	2012
"Don't Forget to Remember Me"	Morgane Hayes, Kelley Lovelace, Ashley Gorley	Some Hearts	2005
"Drinking Alone"	Underwood, David Garcia, Brett James	Cry Pretty	2018
"Drunk and Hungover"	Hillary Lindsey, Jordan Reynolds, Nicolle Galyon	Denim & Rhinestones (Deluxe Edition)	2023

== E ==
Song	Writer	Album	Year
"Edelweiss" (with Stephen Moyer, Ariane Rinehart, Michael Nigro, Ella Watts-Gorman, Joe West, Sophia Caruso, Grace Rundhaug & Peyton Ell)	Rodgers & Hammerstein	The Sound of Music: Music from the NBC Television Event	2013
"End Up with You"	Hillary Lindsey, Brett McLaughlin, Will Weatherly	Cry Pretty	2018
"Ever Ever After"	Michael Kosarin, Alan Menken, Stephen Schwartz	Enchanted: Original Soundtrack	2007

== F ==
Song	Writer	Album	Year
"Faster"	Underwood, Hillary Lindsey, David Garcia	Denim & Rhinestone	2022
"Favorite Time of Year"	Underwood, Hillary Lindsey, Chris DeStefano	My Gift (Amazon Music Bonus Track)	2020
"The Fighter" (with Keith Urban)	Keith Urban, Busbee	Ripcord	2016
"The First Noel"	Traditional	Carnival Ride (Walmart Holiday Edition Bonus Disc)	2008
"Flat on the Floor"	Ashley Monroe, Brett James	Carnival Ride	2007
"Forever Changed"	Tom Douglas, James T. Slater, Hillary Lindsey	Blown Away	2012
"Forever Country" (as Artists of Then, Now & Forever)	Bill Danoff, Taffy Nivert, John Denver, Willie Nelson, Dolly Parton	—N/a (Note: Song released as a stand-alone single.)	2016

== G ==
Song	Writer	Album	Year
"Garden"	Underwood, David Garcia, Josh Miller	Denim & Rhinestone	2022
"Get Out of This Town"	Gordie Sampson, Steve McEwan, Hillary Lindsey	Carnival Ride	2007
"Ghost Story"	David Garcia, Hillary Lindsey, Josh Kear	Denim & Rhinestones	2022
"Ghosts on the Stereo"	Hillary Lindsey, Tom Douglas, Andrew Dorff	Cry Pretty	2018
"The Girl You Think I Am"	Underwood, Hillary Lindsey, David Hodges	Storyteller	2015
"Give Her That"	Underwood, David Garcia, Lydia Vaughn	Denim & Rhinestones (Deluxe Edition)	2023
"Good Girl"	Underwood, Chris DeStefano, Ashley Gorley	Blown Away	2012
"Good in Goodbye"	Underwood, Ryan Tedder, Hillary Lindsey	Blown Away	2012
"Great Is Thy Faithfulness" (feat. CeCe Winans)	Thomas Chisholm, William M. Runyan	My Savior	2021

== H ==
Song	Writer	Album	Year
"Hallelujah" (feat. John Legend)	John Stephens, Toby Gad	My Gift	2020
"Hark! The Herald Angels Sing"	Charles Wesley	Carnival Ride (Walmart Holiday Edition Bonus Disc)	2008
"Hate My Heart"	Underwood, Hillary Lindsey, Michael Hardy, David Garcia	Denim & Rhinestone	2022
"Have Yourself a Merry Little Christmas"	Ralph Blane, Hugh Martin	My Gift	2020
"Heartbeat"	Underwood, Zach Crowell, Ashley Gorley	Storyteller	2015
"High Life" (with Brad Paisley)	Brad Paisley, Kelley Lovelace, Chris DuBois, Brent Anderson	Moonshine in the Trunk	2014
"Home Sweet Home"	Nikki Sixx, Tommy Lee	—N/a (Note: "Home Sweet Home" released as a stand-alone single in the US. The song was however included on the deluxe edition of Play On in Australia and New Zealand.)	2009
"How Great Thou Art"	Carl Boberg, Stuart K. Hine	My Savior	2021

== I ==
Song	Writer	Album	Year
"I Ain't in Checotah Anymore"	Underwood, Trey Bruce, Angelo Petraglia	Some Hearts	2005
"I Just Can't Live a Lie"	Steve Robson, Wayne Hector	Some Hearts	2005
"I Know You Won't"	Wendell Mobley, Neil Thrasher, Steven McEwan	Carnival Ride	2007
"I Surrender All"	Judson W. Van DeVenter, Winfield S. Weeden	My Savior	2021
"I Told You So" (also re-released as a duet with Randy Travis)	Randy Travis	Carnival Ride	2007
"I Wanna Remember" (with Needtobreathe)	Bear Rinehart, Jordan Reynolds, Parker Welling	Into the Mystery	2021
"If I Didn't Love You" (with Jason Aldean)	Tully Kennedy, John Morgan, Kurt Allison, Bernardis Hughes	Macon, Georgia	2021
"I'll Be Home for Christmas" (with Elvis Presley)	Walter Kent, Kim Gannon, Buck Ram	Christmas Duets	2008
"I'll Stand by You"	Chrissie Hynde, Tom Kelly, Billy Steinberg	Idol Gives Back	2007
"Independence Day"	Gretchen Peters	American Idol Season 4: The Showstoppers	2005
"Inside Your Heaven"	Andreas Carlsson, Pelle Nyhlén, Savan Kotecha	Some Hearts	2005
"Is It Still Over?" (with Randy Travis)	Ken Bell, Larry Henley	Anniversary Celebration	2011
"It Had to Be You" (with Tony Bennett)	Isham Jones, Gus Kahn	Duets II	2011

== J ==
Song	Writer	Album	Year
"Jesus Loves Me" (Instrumental)	Anna Bartlett Warner, William Batchelder Bradbury	My Savior	2021
"Jesus, Take the Wheel"	Brett James, Hillary Lindsey, Gordie Sampson	Some Hearts	2005
"Joyful, Joyful We Adore Thee"	Henry van Dyke Jr., Ludwig van Beethoven	My Gift	2020
"Just a Dream"	Hillary Lindsey, Steve McEwan, Gordie Sampson	Carnival Ride	2007
"Just as I Am"	Charlotte Elliott, William Batchelder Bradbury	My Savoir	2021

== K ==
Song	Writer	Album	Year
"Keep Us Safe"	Underwood, Hillary Lindsey, Luke Laird, Shane McAnally	—N/a	2014
"Kingdom"	Underwood, Chris DeStefano, Dave Barnes	Cry Pretty	2018

== L ==
Song	Writer	Album	Year
"Last Name"	Underwood, Luke Laird, Hillary Lindsey	Carnival Ride	2007
"Leave Love Alone"	Gordie Sampson, Troy Verges, Hillary Lindsey	Blown Away	2012
"Lessons Learned"	Diane Warren	Some Hearts	2005
"Let There Be Peace"	Underwood, Brett James, David Garcia	My Gift	2020
"Like I'll Never Love You Again"	Hillary Lindsey, Lori McKenna, Liz Rose	Storyteller	2015
"The Little Drummer Boy" (feat. Isaiah Fisher)	Harry Simeone, Katherine Kennicott Davis, Henry Onorati	My Gift	2020
"Little Girl Don't Grow Up Too Fast"	Underwood, Hillary Lindsey, Chris DeStefano	Storyteller - Target exclusive edition	2015
"Little Toy Guns"	Underwood, Chris DeStefano, Hillary Lindsey	Greatest Hits: Decade #1	2014
"The Lonely Goatherd" (with Ariane Rinehart, Michael Nigro, Ella Watts-Gorman, Joe West, Sophia Caruso, Grace Rundhaug, Peyton Ella)	Rodgers & Hammerstein	The Sound of Music: Music from the NBC Television Event	2013
"Look at Me"	Jim Collins, Paul Overstreet	Play On	2009
"Love Wins"	Underwood, David Garcia, Brett James	Cry Pretty	2018
"Low"	Underwood, Hillary Lindsey, David Garcia	Cry Pretty	2018

== M ==
Song	Writer	Album	Year
"Mama's Song"	Underwood, Kara DioGuardi, Marti Frederikson, Luke Laird	Play On	2009
"Mary, Did You Know?"	Mark Lowry, Buddy Greene	My Gift	2020
"Mexico"	Kathleen Higgins, Jamie Moore, Derrick Adam Southerland	Storyteller	2015
"The More Boys I Meet"	Scott Kennedy, Steve McEwan	Carnival Ride	2007
"My Favorite Things" (with Audra McDonald)	Rodgers & Hammerstein	The Sound of Music: Music from the NBC Television Event	2013

== N ==
Song	Writer	Album	Year
"The Night Before (Life Goes On)"	Wendell Mobley, Neil Thrasher, Steve McEwan	Some Hearts	2005
"Nobody Ever Told You"	Underwood, Luke Laird, Hillary Lindsey	Blown Away	2012
"Nothing but the Blood of Jesus"	Robert Lowry	My Savior	2021

== O ==
Song	Writer	Album	Year
"O Come, All Ye Faithful"	John Francis Wade, Frederick Oakeley	My Gift	2020
"O Holy Night"	Adolphe Adam	Carnival Ride (Walmart Holiday Edition Bonus Disc)	2008
"O Holy Night"	Adolphe Adam	My Gift	2020
"O How I Love Jesus"	Frederick Whitfield	My Savior	2021
"Oh Love" (with Brad Paisley)	Hillary Lindsey, Aimee Mayo, Gordie Sampson	5th Gear	2007
"The Old Rugged Cross"	George Bennard	My Savior	2021
"One Way Ticket"	Underwood, Luke Laird, Josh Kear	Blown Away	2012
"Only Us" (with Dan + Shay)	Pasek and Paul	Dear Evan Hansen	2021
"Out of That Truck"	Underwood, David Garcia, Lydia Vaughn	Denim & Rhinestones (Deluxe Edition)	2023

== P ==
Song	Writer	Album	Year
"Pink Champagne"	Underwood, Hillary Lindsey, Ashley Gorley, David Garcia	Denim & Rhinestone	2022
"Play On"	Underwood, Natalie Hemby, Luke Laird	Play On	2009
"Poor Everybody Else"	Underwood, Josh Miller, Chris DeStefano	Denim & Rhinestone	2022
"Praying for Time"	George Michael	—N/a	2008

== Q ==
Song	Writer	Album	Year
"Quitter"	Max Martin, Shellback, Savan Kotecha	Play On	2009

== R ==
Song	Writer	Album	Year
"Remind Me" (with Brad Paisley)	Brad Paisley, Chris DuBois, Kelley Lovelace	This is Country Music	2011
"Relapse"	Brett James, Ben Caver, Sara Haze	Storyteller	2015
"Renegade Runaway"	Underwood, Hillary Lindsey, Chris DeStefano	Storyteller	2015

== S ==
Song	Writer	Album	Year
"See You Again"	Underwood, David Hodges, Hillary Lindsey	Blown Away	2012
"She Don't Know"	Underwood, Hillary Lindsey, David Garcia	Denim & Rhinestone	2022
"Silent Night"	Franz Xaver Gruber, Joseph Mohr	My Gift	2020
"Sixteen Going on Seventeen" (Reprise) (with Ariane Rinehart)	Rodgers & Hammerstein	The Sound of Music: Music from the NBC Television Event	2013
"Smoke Break"	Underwood, Hillary Lindsey, Chris DeStefano	Storyteller	2015
"So Long, Farewell" (Reprise) (with Stephen Moyer, Ariane Rinehart, Michael Nigro, Ella Watts-Gorman, Joe West, Sophia Caruso, Grace Rundhaug & Peyton Ell)	Rodgers & Hammerstein	The Sound of Music: Music from the NBC Television Event	2013
"So Small"	Underwood, Luke Laird, Hillary Lindsey	Carnival Ride	2007
"Softly and Tenderly"	Will Lamartine Thompson	My Savoir	2021
"Some Hearts"	Diane Warren	Some Hearts	2005
"Someday When I Stop Loving You"	Hillary Lindsey, Steve McEwan, Gordie Sampson	Play On	2009
"Somethin' Bad" (with Miranda Lambert)	Chris DeStefano, Brett James, Priscilla Renea	Platinum	2014
"Something Good" (with Stephen Moyer)	Richard Rodgers	The Sound of Music: Music from the NBC Television Event	2013
"Something in the Water"	Underwood, Chris DeStefano, Brett James	Greatest Hits: Decade #1	2014
"Sometimes You Leave"	Chris Tompkins, Kara DioGuardi, Shridhar Solanki	Carnival Ride - MusicPass Bonus Tracks	2007
"Songs Like This"	Marty Dodson, Jerry Flowers, Tom Shapiro	Play On	2009
"The Sound of Music"	Rodgers & Hammerstein	The Sound of Music: Music from the NBC Television Event	2013
"Southbound"	Underwood, David Garcia, Josh Miller	Cry Pretty	2018
"Spinning Bottles"	Underwood, Hillary Lindsey, David Garcia	Cry Pretty	2018
"Starts with Goodbye"	Hillary Lindsey, Angelo Petraglia	Some Hearts	2005
"Still Woman Enough" (with Loretta Lynn and Reba McEntire)	Loretta Lynn, Patsy Lynn Russell	Still Woman Enough	2021
"Stretchy Pants"	Underwood, Hillary Lindsey, Chris DeStefano	—N/a	2021
"Sweet Baby Jesus"	Underwood, Brett James, David Garcia	My Gift	2020

== T ==
Song	Writer	Album	Year
"Take Me Out"	Underwood, David Garcia, Hillary Lindsey	Denim & Rhinestone (Deluxe Edition)	2023
"Tears of Gold" (with David Bisbal)	Cameron Forbes Lewis, Paul John Harris, Matti Schwartz, Mauricio Rengifo, Andrés Torres	En Tus Planes	2020
"Temporary Home"	Underwood, Luke Laird, Zac Maloy	Play On	2009
"That Song That We Used to Make Love To"	Hillary Lindsey, Jason Evigan	Cry Pretty	2018
"That's Where It Is"	Melissa Peirce, Steve Robson, Greg Becker	Some Hearts	2005
"Thank God For Hometowns"	Luke Laird, Ashley Gorley, Hillary Lindsey	Blown Away	2012
"There's a Place for Us"	Underwood, Hillary Lindsey, David Hodges	The Chronicles of Narnia: The Voyage of the Dawn Treader	2010
"This Side of Heaven" (with The Swon Brothers)	Blake Bollinger, Ryan Lafferty, Ben Stennis	The Swon Brothers	2014
"This Time"	Hillary Lindsey, Steve McEwan, Gordie Sampson	Play On	2009
"Twisted"	Brett James, Hillary Lindsey, Luke Laird	Carnival Ride	2007
"Two Black Cadillacs"	Underwood, Hillary Lindsey, Josh Kear	Blown Away	2012

== U ==
Song	Writer	Album	Year
"Unapologize"	Underwood, Hillary Lindsey, Raine Maida, Chantal Kreviazuk	Play On	2009
"Undo It"	Underwood, Kara DioGuardi, Luke Laird, Martin Frederikson	Play On	2009

== V ==
Song	Writer	Album	Year
"Velvet Heartbreak"	Underwood, David Garcia, Hillary Lindsey	Denim & Rhinestone	2022
"Victory in Jesus"	Eugene Monroe Bartlett	My Savior	2021

== W ==
Song	Writer	Album	Year
"Wanted Woman"	Underwood, David Garcia, Josh Miller	Denim & Rhinestone	2022
"Wasted"	Troy Verges, Marv Green, Hillary Lindsey	Some Hearts	2005
"We're Young and Beautiful"	Rivers Rutherford, Steve McEwan	Some Hearts	2005
"What Can I Say" (featuring Sons of Sylvia)	Underwood, David Hodges, Steve McEwan	Play On	2009
"What Child Is This?"	William Chatterton Dix	Carnival Ride (Walmart Holiday Edition Bonus Disc)	2008
"What I Never Knew I Always Wanted"	Underwood, Hillary Lindsey, Brett James	Storyteller	2015
"Wheel of the World"	Hillary Lindsey, Aimee Mayo, Chris Lindsey	Carnival Ride	2007
"Whenever You Remember"	Dianne Warren	Some Hearts	2005
"Who Are You"	Robert John "Mutt" Lange	Blown Away	2012
"Wine After Whiskey"	Underwood, Tom Shapiro, Dave Berg	Blown Away	2012

== Y ==
Song	Writer	Album	Year
"You Won't Find This"	Cathy Dennis, Tom Shapiro	Carnival Ride	2007
"You're Lookin' at Country"	Loretta Lynn	Coal Miner's Daughter: A Tribute to Loretta Lynn	2010
