= Carrie Underwood discography =

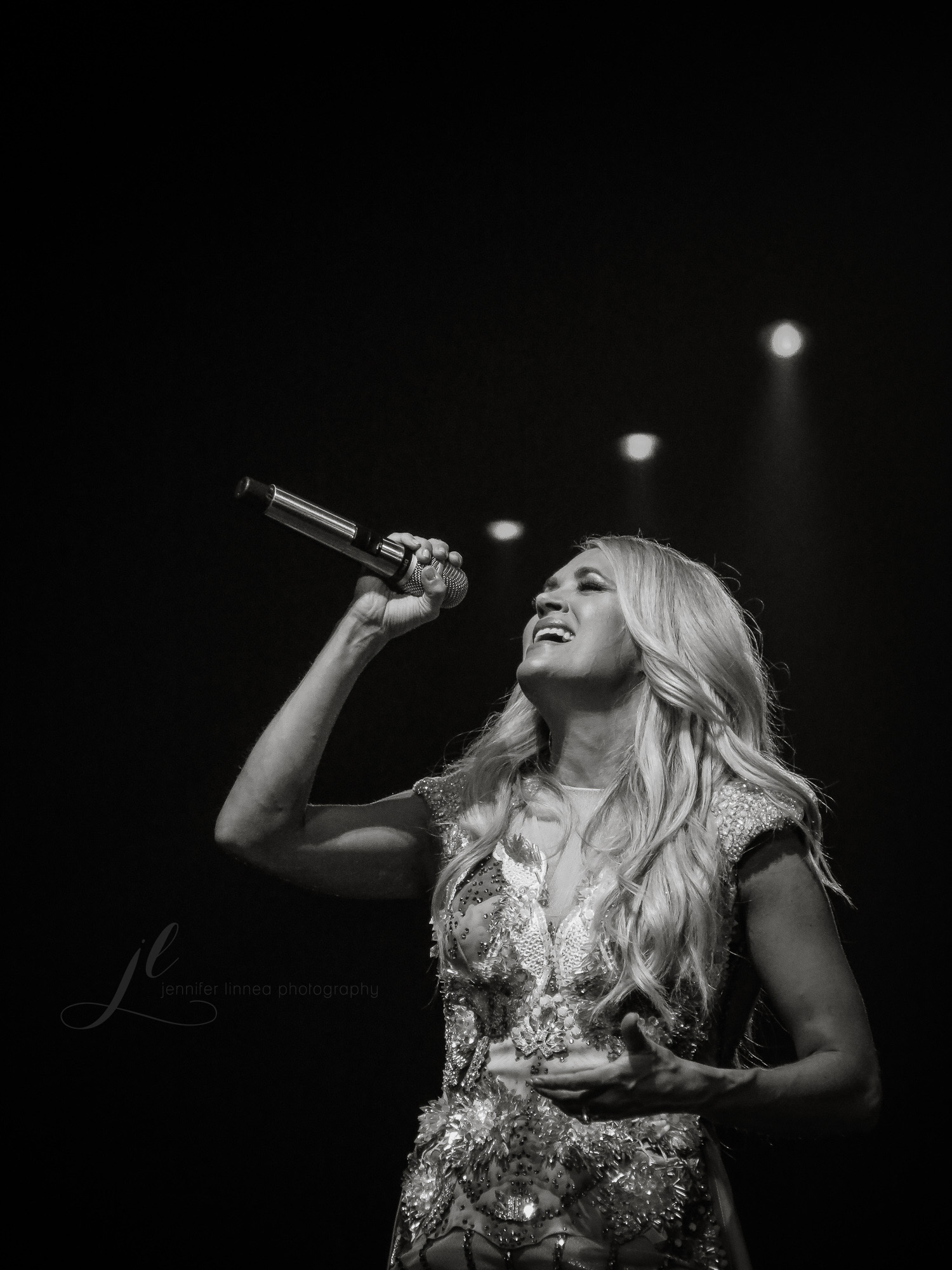
- Underwood performing at the Pepsi Center in Denver, Colorado in 2019.
- Studio albums: 9
- Extended plays: 1
- Compilation albums: 1
- Singles: 38
- Video albums: 1
- Music videos: 40
- Other charted songs: 11
- Promotional singles: 20

American singer Carrie Underwood has released nine studio albums, one greatest hits album, and 38 singles. Underwood rose to fame after winning the fourth season of American Idol in 2005. Her debut album, Some Hearts, was released in 2005 and is the fastest-selling debut country album in Nielsen SoundScan history. It also became the best-selling solo female country debut in Recording Industry Association of America (RIAA) history, as well as the top-selling debut album of any American Idol contestant in the United States.

Her second album, Carnival Ride, was released in 2007 and debuted at number one on the Billboard 200 charts. During the first week, it sold 527,000 copies, which at the time was the best sales week by a female solo country artist since Shania Twain's Greatest Hits sold 530,000 copies in its first week back in 2004. The album has since been certified 4× Platinum.

Underwood released her third studio album, Play On, on November 3, 2009. It debuted at number one on the Top Country Albums chart and the all-genre Billboard 200. It features the number one singles "Cowboy Casanova", "Temporary Home", and "Undo It", as well as the number two single, "Mama's Song". The album has since been certified 3× Platinum in the US, Platinum in Canada, and Gold in Australia. In June 2011, the album re-entered the Australian Albums Chart for both the ARIA National Top 50 and the Country Top 20 albums at number 14 and number one, respectively, giving Underwood her first number one album in Australia. The album was eventually certified Gold in Australia.

On May 1, 2012, Underwood released her fourth album, Blown Away. In the United States, it sold 267,000 albums in its first week and debuted at number one on the Billboard 200 and the Top Country Albums charts. It debuted at number one in Canada's Top 200 all-genre albums chart and Top 100 Country albums chart, being immediately certified Gold. The album also debuted at number one on Australia's Top 20 Country Albums and number four on the all-genre Top 50 Albums. The album has been certified 2× Platinum in the United States and Canada.

On December 9, 2014, Underwood released her first greatest hits album, Greatest Hits: Decade #1. The compilation debuted at number four on the Billboard 200 and at number one on the Top Country Albums charts, and set several records upon release, including having the biggest sales debut for a hits collection in any genre of music in more than six years and the biggest first-week sales for a female hits album in any genre in over nine years. The album was certified Platinum by the RIAA on January 16, 2015.

Underwood's fifth studio album, Storyteller was released on October 23, 2015. The album debuted at number 2 on the Billboard 200. This made Underwood the only country artist to have his or her first five studio albums debut at number one or number two on the Billboard 200 chart. It also debuted atop the Top Country Albums chart, earning Underwood another record as the only artist to score six consecutive number one albums on that chart. The album was certified Platinum by the RIAA on October 24, 2016.

Underwood released her sixth studio album, Cry Pretty, on September 14, 2018. The album debuted at number one on the Billboard 200 chart, making Underwood the first woman to have four number one country albums on that chart. It sold 266,000 album-equivalent units in its first week, out of which 251,000 copies were pure sales, giving Underwood the largest sales week for a female artist in 2018.

On September 25, 2020, Underwood released her seventh studio album and first Christmas album, My Gift. The album debuted at number one on the Billboard Top Christian Albums chart, Top Holiday Albums chart and Top Country Albums chart, setting the record as the first artist to score eight consecutive number one debuts on the latter chart. The album debuted at number eight on the Billboard 200 albums chart with 43,000 units and later peaked at number five.

In the United States, Underwood remains the best-selling album artist from American Idol franchise with a total of 16.3 million albums sold. She is the top country artist and the fifth highest-certified female artist on the RIAA Top Artists (Digital Singles) Ranking. She is also the fourth biggest album seller among artists who have debuted the past 13 years. Underwood has accumulated over 85 Billboard number-ones. She has had 16 singles top the Billboard Country Airplay, and 14 singles top the Hot Country Songs. Underwood has the longest streak of top 10 promoted singles from a career's start on the Hot Country Songs chart at 27.

== Albums ==
=== Studio albums ===
List of studio albums, with selected chart positions, sales figures and certifications
| Title | Album details | Peak chart positions | | | | | | | | Sales | Certifications |
| Title | Album details | US | US Country | AUS | CAN | IRL | NZ | SCO | UK | Sales | Certifications |
|---|---|---|---|---|---|---|---|---|---|---|---|
| Some Hearts | Released: November 15, 2005; Label: Arista Nashville, 19; Formats: CD, digital download, LP | 2 | 1 | 130 | 11 | — | — | — | — | US: 7,500,000 | RIAA: 9× Platinum; ARIA: Gold; MC: 3× Platinum; RMNZ: Platinum |
| Carnival Ride | Released: October 23, 2007; Label: Arista Nashville, 19; Formats: CD, digital download | 1 | 1 | 105 | 1 | — | — | — | — | US: 3,400,000 | RIAA: 4× Platinum; MC: Platinum |
| Play On | Released: November 3, 2009; Label: Arista Nashville, 19; Formats: CD, digital download | 1 | 1 | 14 | 2 | 91 | — | — | 93 | US: 2,300,000 | RIAA: 3× Platinum; ARIA: Gold; MC: Platinum |
| Blown Away | Released: May 1, 2012; Label: Arista Nashville, 19; Formats: CD, digital download | 1 | 1 | 4 | 1 | 26 | 22 | 8 | 11 | US: 1,850,000 | RIAA: 3× Platinum; ARIA: Gold; BPI: Gold; MC: Platinum |
| Storyteller | Released: October 23, 2015; Label: Arista Nashville, 19; Formats: CD, digital download, LP | 2 | 1 | 4 | 3 | 18 | 13 | 6 | 13 | US: 753,000 | RIAA: Platinum; BPI: Silver |
| Cry Pretty | Released: September 14, 2018; Label: Capitol Nashville; Formats: CD, digital download, LP | 1 | 1 | 4 | 1 | 40 | 32 | 12 | 16 | US: 534,000 | RIAA: Platinum; MC: Platinum |
| My Gift | Released: September 25, 2020; Label: Capitol Nashville; Formats: CD, digital download, LP | 5 | 1 | 98 | 28 | — | — | — | — (Note: My Gift did not enter the UK Albums Chart, but peaked at number 37 on the UK Album Downloads Chart.) | US: 628,000 | RIAA: Gold |
| My Savior | Released: March 26, 2021; Label: Capitol Nashville; Formats: CD, digital download, LP | 4 | 1 | 54 | 15 | — | — | 26 | — (Note: My Savior did not enter the UK Albums Chart, but peaked at number 22 on the UK Album Downloads chart.) | US: 293,000 | RIAA: Gold |
| Denim & Rhinestones | Released: June 10, 2022; Label: Capitol Nashville; Formats: CD, digital download, LP | 10 | 2 | 21 | 33 | — | — | 40 | — (Note: Denim & Rhinestones did not enter the UK Albums Chart, but peaked at number 8 on the UK Album Downloads chart.) | US: 132,000 | |
"—" denotes releases that did not chart or were not released to that country.

=== Compilation albums ===
List of compilation albums, with selected chart positions, sales figures and certifications
| Title | Album details | Peak chart positions | | | | Sales | Certifications |
| Title | Album details | US | US Country | AUS | CAN | Sales | Certifications |
|---|---|---|---|---|---|---|---|
| Greatest Hits: Decade #1 | Released: December 9, 2014; Label: Arista Nashville, 19; Formats: CD, digital download | 4 | 1 | 49 | 15 | US: 564,300 | RIAA: Platinum; BPI: Gold |

=== Video albums ===
List of video albums, with selected chart positions and certifications
| Title | Album details | Peak chart positions | | | | Certifications |
| Title | Album details | US Video | AUS Video | CAN Video | UK Video | Certifications |
|---|---|---|---|---|---|---|
| The Blown Away Tour: Live | Released: August 13, 2013; Label: Arista Nashville, 19; Formats: DVD | 1 | 3 | 1 | 5 | RIAA: Gold |

=== Soundtrack albums ===
List of soundtracks, with selected chart positions, showing other relevant details
| Title | Album details | Peak chart positions | |
| Title | Album details | US | US Soundtracks |
|---|---|---|---|
| The Sound of Music: Music from the NBC Television Event | Released: December 3, 2013; Label: Sony Masterworks; Formats: CD, music download | 17 | 2 |

== Extended plays ==
List of EPs, showing other relevant details
| Title | Album details |
|---|---|
| Music Up, Windows Down | Released: May 22, 2025; Label: uDiscover Music Release; Formats: Music download, streaming |

== Singles ==
=== As lead artist ===
List of singles, with selected chart positions and certifications
| Title | Year | Peak chart positions | | | | | | | | | | Certifications | Album |
| Title | Year | US | US Country | US Country Airplay | US Country Digital | US Christ | US AC | CAN | CAN Country | SCO | UK | Certifications | Album |
|---|---|---|---|---|---|---|---|---|---|---|---|---|---|
| "Inside Your Heaven" | 2005 | 1 | 52 | | — | — | 12 | 1 | — | — | — | RIAA: Platinum; MC: 2× Platinum | Non-album single |
| "Jesus, Take the Wheel" | 2005 | 20 | 1 | | 46 | 4 | 23 | — | 1 | — | — | RIAA: 3× Platinum; MC: Gold; RMNZ: Gold | Some Hearts |
| "Some Hearts" | 2005 | — | — | | — | — | 12 | — | — | — | — | | Some Hearts |
| "Don't Forget to Remember Me" | 2006 | 49 | 2 | | — | — | — | — | 4 | — | — | RIAA: Gold | Some Hearts |
| "Before He Cheats" | 2006 | 8 | 1 | | 37 | — | 6 | 4 | 1 | — | — | RIAA: 11× Platinum; BPI: 2× Platinum; MC: Platinum; RMNZ: 3× Platinum | Some Hearts |
| "Wasted" | 2007 | 37 | 1 | | — | — | — | 35 | 1 | — | — | RIAA: Platinum | Some Hearts |
| "I'll Stand by You" | 2007 | 6 | 41 | | — | — | — | 10 | — | — | — | | Non-album single |
| "So Small" | 2007 | 17 | 1 | | — | — | — | 14 | 3 | — | — | RIAA: Platinum | Carnival Ride |
| "All-American Girl" | 2008 | 27 | 1 | | — | — | — | 45 | 1 | — | — | RIAA: 3× Platinum | Carnival Ride |
| "Last Name" | 2008 | 19 | 1 | | — | — | — | 34 | 3 | — | — | RIAA: 2× Platinum | Carnival Ride |
| "Praying for Time" | 2008 | 27 | — | | — | — | – | 33 | — | — | — | | Non-album single |
| "Just a Dream" | 2008 | 29 | 1 | | — | — | — | 50 | 2 | — | — | RIAA: 2× Platinum | Carnival Ride |
| "Just Stand Up!" (with Artists Stand Up to Cancer) | 2008 | 11 | — | | — | – | – | 10 | — | — | — | RIAA: 2× Platinum | Non-album single |
| "I Told You So" (featuring Randy Travis) | 2009 | 9 | 2 | | — | — | — | 18 | 1 | — | 129 | RIAA: Platinum | Carnival Ride |
| "Home Sweet Home" | 2009 | 21 | 52 | | — | — | — | 33 | — | — | — | | Non-album single |
| "Cowboy Casanova" | 2009 | 11 | 1 | | 2 | — | — | 16 | 2 | — | — | RIAA: 4× Platinum; MC: Gold | Play On |
| "Temporary Home" | 2009 | 41 | 1 | | 5 | 34 | — | 65 | 2 | — | — | RIAA: 2× Platinum | Play On |
| "Undo It" | 2010 | 23 | 1 | | 1 | — | — | 43 | 2 | — | — | RIAA: 2× Platinum | Play On |
| "Mama's Song" | 2010 | 56 | 2 | | 15 | — | — | 68 | 10 | — | — | RIAA: Platinum | Play On |
| "There's a Place for Us" | 2010 | — (Note: "There's a Place for Us" did not enter the Billboard Hot 100, but peaked at number seven on the Bubbling Under Hot 100 Singles chart, which acts as a 25-song extension.) | — | | 11 | — | — | — | — | — | — | | The Chronicles of Narnia: The Voyage of the Dawn Treader |
| "Remind Me" (with Brad Paisley) | 2011 | 17 | 1 | | 2 | — | — | 33 | 1 | — | — | RIAA: 2× Platinum | This Is Country Music |
| "Good Girl" | 2012 | 18 | 1 | | 1 | — | — | 21 | 1 | — | — | RIAA: 3× Platinum; MC: Platinum | Blown Away |
| "Blown Away" | 2012 | 20 | 2 | 1 | 2 | — | — | 27 | 1 | 100 | 155 | RIAA: 5× Platinum; MC: Platinum | Blown Away |
| "Two Black Cadillacs" | 2012 | 41 | 4 | 2 | 3 | — | — | 52 | 3 | — | — | RIAA: 2× Platinum | Blown Away |
| "See You Again" | 2013 | 34 | 7 | 2 | 11 | — | — | 45 | 2 | — | — | RIAA: 2× Platinum | Blown Away |
| "Somethin' Bad" (with Miranda Lambert) | 2014 | 19 | 1 | 7 | 1 | — | — | 33 | 6 | — | — | RIAA: 2× Platinum | Platinum |
| "Something in the Water" | 2014 | 24 | 1 | 3 | 1 | 1 | — | 29 | 3 | 88 | 192 | RIAA: 2× Platinum | Greatest Hits: Decade #1 |
| "Little Toy Guns" | 2015 | 47 | 6 | 2 | 10 | — | — | 70 | 7 | — | — | RIAA: Platinum | Greatest Hits: Decade #1 |
| "Smoke Break" | 2015 | 43 | 4 | 2 | 1 | — | — | 53 | 1 | — | — | RIAA: Platinum | Storyteller |
| "Heartbeat" | 2015 | 42 | 2 | 1 | 3 | — | — | 60 | 1 | 80 | — | RIAA: Platinum | Storyteller |
| "Church Bells" | 2016 | 43 | 2 | 1 | 4 | — | — | 64 | 2 | — | — | RIAA: 3× Platinum; RMNZ: Gold | Storyteller |
| "Dirty Laundry" | 2016 | 48 | 3 | 2 | 7 | — | — | 71 | 1 | — | — | RIAA: Platinum | Storyteller |
| "The Champion" (featuring Ludacris) | 2018 | 47 | — | 57 | — | — | — | — | — | — | — | RIAA: 2× Platinum | Cry Pretty |
| "Cry Pretty" | 2018 | 48 | 5 | 9 | 1 | — | — | 83 | 8 | 75 | — | RIAA: Platinum | Cry Pretty |
| "Love Wins" | 2018 | 83 | 14 | 11 | 1 | — | — | — | 26 | 90 | — | RIAA: Gold | Cry Pretty |
| "Southbound" | 2019 | 64 | 11 | 3 | 11 | — | — | — | 1 | — | — | RIAA: Platinum | Cry Pretty |
| "Drinking Alone" | 2019 | 74 | 17 | 11 | 14 | — | — | — | 30 | — | — | RIAA: Gold | Cry Pretty |
| "Hallelujah" (with John Legend) | 2020 | 54 | 3 | 57 | 4 | 1 | 3 | — | — | — | — | RIAA: Gold | My Gift |
| "If I Didn't Love You" (with Jason Aldean) | 2021 | 15 | 2 | 1 | 1 | — | — | 35 | 1 | × | — (Note: "If I Didn't Love You" did not enter the UK Singles Chart, but peaked at number 49 on the UK Singles Sales Chart.) | RIAA: Platinum | Macon |
| "Ghost Story" | 2022 | 61 | 12 | 6 | 1 | — | — | 84 | 9 | × | — (Note: "Ghost Story" did not enter the UK Singles Chart, but peaked at number 78 on the UK Singles Sales Chart.) | RIAA: Gold | Denim & Rhinestones |
| "Hate My Heart" | 2022 | — | — | 20 | — | — | — | — | 24 | × | — | | Denim & Rhinestones |
| "Out of That Truck" (Note: "Out of That Truck" is only found on the deluxe edition of Denim & Rhinestones.) | 2023 | — | 38 | 18 | 6 | — | — | — | 9 | × | — | RIAA: Gold | Denim & Rhinestones |
| "I'm Gonna Love You" (with Cody Johnson) | 2024 | 37 | 7 | 3 | 1 | — | — | 78 | 8 | × | — | RIAA: Platinum | Leather (Deluxe Edition) |
"—" denotes releases that did not chart or were not released to that country "x" denotes periods where charts no longer exist or were archived.

=== As featured artist ===
| Year | Title | Artist | Peak chart positions | | | | | | | | Certifications | Album |
| Year | Title | Artist | US | US Country | US Country Airplay | AUS | CAN | CAN Country | SCO | UK Sales | Certifications | Album |
|---|---|---|---|---|---|---|---|---|---|---|---|---|
| 2013 | "Can't Stop Lovin' You" | Aerosmith | — | — | — | — | — | — | — | — | | Music from Another Dimension! |
| 2016 | "Forever Country" | Artists of Then, Now & Forever | 21 | 1 | 32 | 26 | 25 | 39 | 29 | 55 | RIAA: Gold | —N/a |
| 2017 | "The Fighter" | Keith Urban | 38 | 2 | 2 | 19 | 67 | 2 | 52 | 63 | RIAA: 3× Platinum; ARIA: 3× Platinum; MC: Platinum; RMNZ: Gold | Ripcord |
| 2020 | "Tears of Gold" | David Bisbal | — | — | — | — | — | — | — | — | RIAA: Gold (Latin) | En Tus Planes |
| 2021 | "I Wanna Remember" | Needtobreathe | — | — (Note: "I Wanna Remember" did not enter the US Hot Country Songs chart, but peaked at number 20 on the Hot Christian Songs chart.) | — | — | — | — | — | — | | Into the Mystery |
| 2024 | "Leave a Light On (Talk Away the Dark)" | Papa Roach | — (Note: "Leave a Light On (Talk Away the Dark)" did not enter the US Billboard Hot 100, but peaked at number 2 on the US Digital Song Sales chart.) | — (Note: "Leave a Light On (Talk Away the Dark)" did not enter the US Hot Country Songs, but peaked at number 40 on the US Hot Rock & Alternative Songs chart.) | — (Note: "Leave a Light On (Talk Away the Dark)" did not enter the US Country Airplay, but peaked at number 10 on the US Rock Airplay chart.) | — (Note: "Leave a Light On (Talk Away the Dark)" did not enter the ARIA Singles Chart, but peaked at number 37 on the ARIA Digital Track Chart.) | — (Note: "Leave a Light On (Talk Away the Dark)" did not enter the Canadian Hot 100, but peaked at number 10 on the Canada Digital Songs chart.) | — | — | 43 | RIAA: Gold | Ego Trip |
"—" denotes releases that did not chart or were not released to that country

=== Promotional singles ===
| Year | Title | Peak chart positions | | | | | | | Certifications | Album |
| Year | Title | US | US Country | US Country Air | US Country Digital | US Adult | CAN | US Christ | Certifications | Album |
|---|---|---|---|---|---|---|---|---|---|---|
| 2010 | "Change" | — (Note: "Change" did not enter the Billboard Hot 100, but peaked at number nine on the Bubbling Under Hot 100 chart, which acts as a 25-song extension.) | — | | 14 | — | — | — | | Play On |
| 2014 | "Keep Us Safe" | — | 36 | — | 20 | — | — | — | | —N/a |
| 2015 | "Renegade Runaway" | — | 34 | — | 13 | — | — | — | | Storyteller |
| 2015 | "What I Never Knew I Always Wanted" | — | 32 | — | 22 | — | — | — | | Storyteller |
| 2018 | "End Up with You" | — | 37 | — | 3 | — | — | — | | Cry Pretty |
| 2020 | "Let There Be Peace" | — | — | — | — | — | — | 21 | | My Gift |
| 2021 | "Softly and Tenderly" | — | — | — | — | — | — | 25 | | My Savior |
| 2021 | "Great Is Thy Faithfulness" (featuring CeCe Winans) | — | — | — | — | — | — | 27 | | My Savior |
| 2021 | "Nothing but the Blood of Jesus" | — | — | — | — | — | — | 23 | | My Savior |
| 2021 | "Only Us" (with Dan + Shay) | — | — | — | 9 | — | — | — | | Dear Evan Hansen |
| 2021 | "Stretchy Pants" | — | — | — | 24 | — | — | — | | —N/a |
| 2022 | "Denim & Rhinestones" | — | — | — | 19 | — | — | — | | Denim & Rhinestones |
| 2022 | "Crazy Angels" | — | — | — | 14 | — | — | — | | Denim & Rhinestones |
| 2022 | "She Don't Know" | — | — | — | — | — | — | — | | Denim & Rhinestones |
| 2023 | "Take Me Out" (Note: "Take Me Out" is only found on the deluxe edition of Denim & Rhinestones.) | — | — | — | 21 | — | — | — | | Denim & Rhinestones |
| 2023 | "Give Her That" (Note: "Give Her That" is only found on the deluxe edition of Denim & Rhinestones.) | — | — | — | — | — | — | — | | Denim & Rhinestones |

== Other charted songs ==
| Year | Title | Peak chart positions | | | | | | Certifications | Album |
| Year | Title | US Count | US Count Dig. | US | US Adult | UK | US Christ | Certifications | Album |
|---|---|---|---|---|---|---|---|---|---|
| 2005 | "Bless the Broken Road" (with Rascal Flatts) | 50 | — | — | — | — | — | | —N/a |
| 2005 | "Independence Day" (Note: "Independence Day" peaked at number 84 on the defunct Pop 100 chart.) | — | — | — | — | — | — | | American Idol Season 4: The Showstoppers |
| 2007 | "Do You Hear What I Hear" | 27 | — | 90 | 2 | — | — | | Hear Something Country Christmas 2007 |
| 2008 | "I'll Be Home for Christmas" (with Elvis Presley) | 54 | — | — | — | — | — | | Christmas Duets |
| 2008 | "Hark! The Herald Angels Sing" | 41 | — | — | 14 | — | — | | Carnival Ride: Holiday Edition |
| 2009 | "O Holy Night" | 39 | — | — | — | — | — | | Carnival Ride: Holiday Edition |
| 2009 | "The First Noel" | 50 | — | — | — | — | — | | Carnival Ride: Holiday Edition |
| 2009 | "What Child Is This?" | 51 | — | — | — | — | — | | Carnival Ride: Holiday Edition |
| 2009 | "The More Boys I Meet" | 45 | — | — | — | — | — | | Carnival Ride |
| 2011 | "Songs Like This" | 38 | — | — | — | — | — | | Play On |
| 2011 | "How Great Thou Art" | — | 13 | — | — | — | — | | How Great Thou Art: Gospel Favorites from the Grand Ole Opry |
| 2011 | "Flat on the Floor" | — | 41 | — | — | — | — | | Carnival Ride |
| 2012 | "Good in Goodbye" | — | 13 | — (Note: "Good in Goodbye" did not enter the Billboard Hot 100, but peaked at number 11 on the Bubbling Under Hot 100 Singles chart, which acts as a 25-song extension.) | — | — | — | | Blown Away |
| 2012 | "Do You Think About Me" | — | 40 | — | — | — | — | | Blown Away |
| 2014 | "I Know You Won't" | — | — | — | — | 94 | — | | Carnival Ride |
| 2014 | "Look at Me" | — | 22 | — | — | 168 | — | | Play On |
| 2014 | "How Great Thou Art" (with Vince Gill) | — | 47 | — | — | — | 12 | RIAA: Gold | Greatest Hits: Decade #1 |
| 2014 | "All is Well" (with Michael W. Smith) | — | — | — | — | — | 6 | | The Spirit of Christmas |
| 2015 | "The Girl You Think I Am" | 38 | 26 | — | — | — | — | | Storyteller |
| 2015 | "Like I'll Never Love You Again" | 39 | 25 | — | — | — | — | | Storyteller |
| 2015 | "Relapse" | 48 | 49 | — | — | — | — | | Storyteller |
| 2020 | "Favorite Time of Year" | 5 | — | 62 | 12 | 63 | 1 | RIAA: Gold | My Gift |
| 2020 | "Silent Night" | 18 | — | 94 | — | — | 2 | | My Gift |
| 2020 | "Little Drummer Boy" (with Isaiah Fisher) | 44 | 24 | — | 21 | — | 5 | | My Gift |
| 2020 | "O Holy Night" | — | — | — | — | — | 11 | | My Gift |
| 2020 | "Mary, Did You Know?" | — | — | — | — | — | 14 | | My Gift |
| 2020 | "Joyful, Joyful We Adore Thee" | — | — | — | — | — | 16 | | My Gift |
| 2020 | "Have Yourself a Merry Little Christmas" | — | — | — | — | — | 18 | | My Gift |
| 2020 | "O Come All Ye Faithful" | — | — | — | — | — | 19 | | My Gift |
| 2020 | "Away in a Manger" | — | — | — | — | — | 24 | | My Gift |
| 2020 | "Sweet Baby Jesus" | — | — | — | — | — | 26 | | My Gift |
| 2021 | "How Great Thou Art" | — | — | — | — | — | 14 | | My Savior |
| 2021 | "Amazing Grace" | — | 24 | — | — | — | 28 | | My Savior |
| 2021 | "Just As I Am" | — | — | — | — | — | 35 | | My Savior |
| 2021 | "Because He Lives" | — | — | — | — | — | 37 | | My Savior |
| 2021 | "Victory in Jesus" | — | — | — | — | — | 38 | | My Savior |
| 2021 | "Blessed Assurance" | — | — | — | — | — | 39 | | My Savior |
| 2021 | "The Old Rugged Cross" | — | — | — | — | — | 45 | | My Savior |
| 2021 | "O How I Love Jesus" | — | — | — | — | — | 50 | | My Savior |
"—" denotes releases that did not chart or were not released to that country.

== Other album appearances ==
| Year | Song | Album |
|---|---|---|
| 2005 | "Independence Day" | American Idol Season 4: The Showstoppers |
| 2007 | "Ever Ever After" | Enchanted |
| 2007 | "Oh Love" (with Brad Paisley) | 5th Gear |
| 2007 | "Do You Hear What I Hear" | Hear Something Country Christmas 2007 |
| 2008 | "How Great Thou Art" | How Great Thou Art: Gospel Favorites from the Grand Ole Opry |
| 2008 | "I'll Be Home for Christmas" (with Elvis Presley) | Christmas Duets |
| 2009 | "The First Noel" | A Very Special Christmas Vol. 7 |
| 2009 | "Hark! The Herald Angels Sing" | A Very Special Christmas Vol. 7 |
| 2010 | "There's a Place for Us" | The Chronicles of Narnia: The Voyage of the Dawn Treader |
| 2010 | "You're Lookin' at Country" | Coal Miner's Daughter: A Tribute to Loretta Lynn |
| 2011 | "Is It Still Over?" (with Randy Travis) | Anniversary Celebration |
| 2011 | "It Had to Be You" (with Tony Bennett) | Duets II |
| 2012 | "Can't Stop Lovin' You" (with Aerosmith) | Music From Another Dimension! |
| 2013 | "Always on My Mind" (with Willie Nelson) | To All the Girls... |
| 2014 | "High Life" (with Brad Paisley) | Moonshine in the Trunk |
| 2014 | "All Is Well" (with Michael W. Smith) | The Spirit of Christmas |
| 2014 | "This Side of Heaven" (with The Swon Brothers) | The Swon Brothers |
| 2016 | "Oh Sunday, Night" (from NBC Sunday Night Football) | —N/a |
| 2018 | "Game On" (from NBC Sunday Night Football) | —N/a |
| 2019 | "Alone" (with Heart) | Live in Atlantic City |
| 2019 | "Barracuda" (Heart featuring Jerry Cantrell, Dave Navarro, Duff McKagan, Rufus Wainwright, Gretchen Wilson and Carrie Underwood) | Live in Atlantic City |
| 2021 | "Still Woman Enough" (Loretta Lynn featuring Reba McEntire and Carrie Underwood) | Still Woman Enough |

== Music videos ==
=== Short form ===
| Year | Title | Director |
|---|---|---|
| 2005 | "Does He Love You" (with Jamie O'Neal) | Ryan Polito |
| 2005 | "Jesus, Take the Wheel" | Roman White |
| 2006 | "Don't Forget to Remember Me" | Roman White |
| 2006 | "Before He Cheats" | Roman White |
| 2007 | "Wasted" | Roman White |
| 2007 | "I'll Stand by You" | Unknown |
| 2007 | "So Small" | Roman White |
| 2007 | "Ever Ever After" | Roman White |
| 2008 | "All-American Girl" | Roman White |
| 2008 | "Last Name" | Roman White |
| 2008 | "Just a Dream" | Roman White |
| 2008 | "Just Stand Up" | Don Mischer |
| 2009 | "I Told You So" (Live) | Jim Yockey |
| 2009 | "Cowboy Casanova" | Theresa Wingert |
| 2010 | "Temporary Home" | Deaton-Flanigen |
| 2010 | "Undo It" | Chris Hicky |
| 2010 | "Mama's Song" | Shaun Silva |
| 2011 | "Remind Me" (with Brad Paisley) | Deaton-Flanigen |
| 2012 | "Good Girl" | Theresa Wingert |
| 2012 | "Blown Away" | Randee St. Nicholas |
| 2013 | "Two Black Cadillacs" | P. R. Brown |
| 2013 | "See You Again" | Eric Welch |
| 2014 | "Somethin' Bad" (with Miranda Lambert) | Trey Fanjoy |
| 2014 | "Something in the Water" | Raj Kapoor |
| 2015 | "Little Toy Guns" | P. R. Brown |
| 2015 | "Smoke Break" | Randee St. Nicholas |
| 2015 | "Heartbeat" | Randee St. Nicholas |
| 2016 | "Church Bells" | Wayne Isham |
| 2016 | "Dirty Laundry" | Shane Drake |
| 2016 | "Forever Country" (Artists of Then, Now & Forever) | Joseph Kahn |
| 2017 | "The Fighter" (with Keith Urban) | John Urbano |
| 2018 | "The Champion" (with Ludacris) | Norry Niven |
| 2018 | "Cry Pretty" | Randee St. Nicholas |
| 2018 | "Love Wins" | Shane Drake |
| 2019 | "Southbound" | Jeff Venable |
| 2019 | "Drinking Alone" | Randee St. Nicholas |
| 2020 | "Hallelujah" (with John Legend) | Randee St. Nicholas |
| 2020 | "Tears of Gold" (with David Bisbal) | Alexis Morante |
| 2021 | "I Wanna Remember" (with Needtobreathe) | |
| 2021 | "If I Didn't Love You" (with Jason Aldean) | Shaun Silva |
| 2022 | ”Ghost Story” | Randee St. Nicholas |
| 2022 | "Hate My Heart" | Shaun Silva |

=== Long form ===
| Year | Title | Notes |
|---|---|---|
| 2013 | The Blown Away Tour: Live | In Ontario, California |
| 2017 | Storyteller Tour: Stories in the Round | At Madison Square Garden (available digitally only) |
