= Denim & Rhinestones Tour =

2022–2023 concert tour by Carrie Underwood

- Tour by Carrie Underwood
- Promotional poster for the tour
- Location: United States
- Associated album: Denim & Rhinestones
- Start date: October 15, 2022
- End date: March 17, 2023
- Legs: 2
- No. of shows: 43
- Supporting act: Jimmie Allen

Carrie Underwood concert chronology
- Reflection (2021–2025); Denim & Rhinestones Tour (2022–2023); ...

The Denim & Rhinestones Tour was the seventh headlining tour American country music artist Carrie Underwood, in support of her ninth studio album, Denim & Rhinestones (2022). The tour began on October 15, 2022, in Greenville, South Carolina, and concluded on March 17, 2023, in Seattle, Washington, comprising 43 concerts. It was the first tour to take place only in the United States.

== Background and development ==
Underwood announced dates for the tour on Monday, May 16, 2022, saying in a press release, "I'm excited to bring the new music of Denim & Rhinestones to life on tour, as well as put new spins on familiar favorites. We’ve been working hard already preparing an amazing show, and I can't wait to see everyone on the road!"

The tour included new production directed by Barry Lather. while Nick Whitehouse, with Fireplay serving as production designers.

Country singer-songwriter Jimmie Allen was announced as opening guest for the tour. Regarding the choice of Allen, Underwood said, "He has a great voice, he's nice to be around, he's funny and easygoing. You want to like the people you're on the road with. He sings songs about Jesus in his set and so do I. And he's very bling-y, so he's quite a good fit for 'Denim & Rhinestones.'"

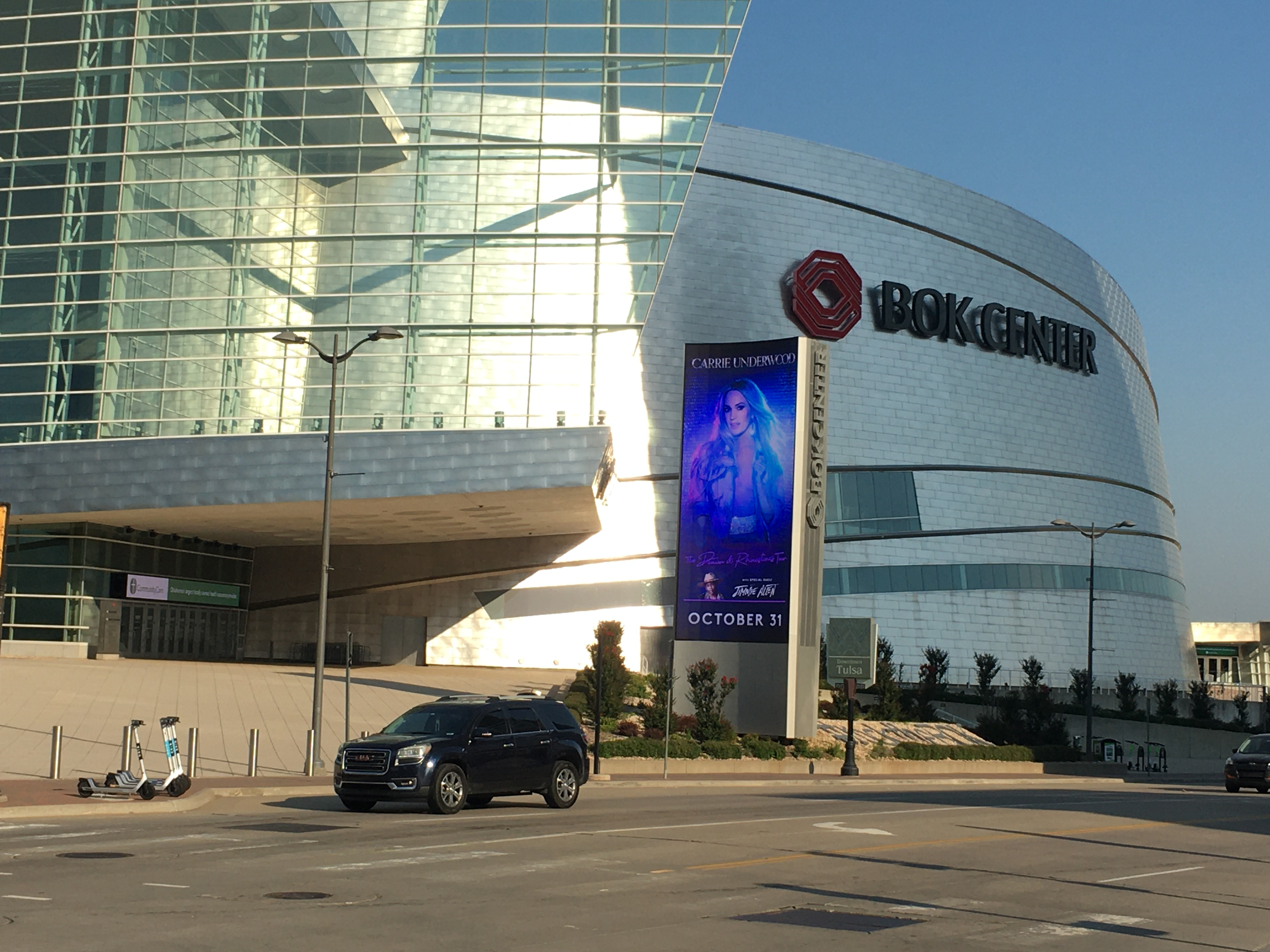
As seen in June 2022, a notice on the BOK Center's marquee regarding Underwood's upcoming show in her native state

From every ticket sold, a donation of one dollar will be made to the Tunnels to Towers Foundation, a nonprofit which supports veterans and their families. This continued a philanthropic practice established on previous Underwood tours. General admission ticket sales began on May 20.

The tour represented her first one since the advent of the COVID-19 pandemic in the United States, although she had performed a concert residency in Las Vegas. Ticket prices were somewhat higher than for previous Underwood tours. While the tour was going, it was announced that Underwood would be returning to her Las Vegas residency later in 2023.

The show was physically demanding for Underwood to do; Underwood spent a month before the tour opening preparing for the shows, doing workouts and other conditioning to get into top shape for it. Unlike her some of her past tours, her young children were not traveling with her, although she was flying home for quick visits to them in between some tour stops. In addition, the itinerary was constructed with a two-month break between the two legs of the tour.

== Concert synopsis ==
Unlike Underwood's two prior tours, which were done in the round, the Denim & Rhinestones Tour featured an end stage set-up. This included three different hydraulic lifts and a couple of ramps. The staging and visual elements of the show were informed by her Vegas residency, and she said, "I’ve always enjoyed the idea of having a show versus just playing a concert. I love having lots of production elements that make things feel unique and songs feel extra special." The show features around a dozen different costumes or costume variants, with, as one reviewer said, "each seemingly flashier and shinier than the one before". For the first time, her show used an aerial component, as a new way for her to get to the B-stage, where a half-dozen songs were performed. One of those was "Two Black Cadillacs", where Underwood accompanied herself on electric guitar.

The show overall was close to two hours in length, and contained around twenty-four songs. She had eight musicians in her band. The set list consisted of eight or nine songs from the Denim & Rhinestones album, with older material spread out over her career. Opener Allen came out and joined her in singing and dancing for the performance of the light-hearted title song from her new album. The number "Burn" featured a prominent pyrotechnics display. Before the song "Garden", Underwood spoke to the audience about the effects of the pandemic and how she hoped it would lead to everyone being more caring towards each other and more positive in their outlooks on life. Her vocal prowess was also on display during the show, several times holding long notes while staying on pitch.

While Underwood had always flavored her country music with elements of pop and rock, the shows on this tour brought out the rock aspect even more. One aspect of that was her rendition of the Guns N' Roses hit "Welcome to the Jungle" near the show's conclusion. She had performed Guns N' Roses material on previous tours (including "Sweet Child o' Mine" and "Paradise City") and she said that she had been working her way up to "Welcome to the Jungle". Indeed, the rock feel was established even as she stepped on stage, as Motörhead's "Ace of Spades" was the final lead-in song played over the sound system. She also played a solo on drums at one point during the show, that caused one reviewer to think of Dave Grohl.

== Commercial and critical reception ==
Of the show in Salt Lake City, the Deseret News wrote that it was "a remarkably versatile show" and that "it would be a disservice to say Underwood is solely a country artist ... Underwood's music had hints of country, gospel, pop, soul, jazz, blues and hard rock." However, the paper noted that some of the subtleties of Underwood's singing tended to be lost in the concert setting, as the volume of her vocals was uniformly loud.

Bob Gendron of the Chicago Tribune wrote that of Underwood's performance that, "despite the bounty of Southern-styled apparel and accents on display, the vocalist leaned more toward the rock spectrum at a vibrant concert at which the 39-year-old served notice that she can likely succeed at anything she wants – and make it look effortless." Gendron did say, however, that using a prerecorded video clip of Jason Aldean singing his part of the "If I Didn't Love You" duet was a "glaring misstep" that "reeked of artifice".

Covering a show in her home state of Oklahoma, Tulsa World said that "Underwood looked every bit like someone who was having fun inside" the BOK Center arena. A writer for the Taste of Country site said that Underwood's show "pushed the envelope both visually and in the live interpretation of her stalwart – and growing – catalog of hits."

A review of the first leg closing show at the Chase Center in San Francisco said that it was one and the best shows of the year and that "Underwood seemed on a mission to prove she could do just about anything and it would be tough to dispute after her two-hour performance. She sang fast songs, slow songs, played the drums, guitar, and flew over the crowd."

== Setlist ==
This setlist is from the October 15, 2022, show in Greenville, South Carolina. It may not represent all dates throughout the tour.

1. "Good Girl"
2. "Church Bells"
3. "Undo It"
4. "Hate My Heart"
5. "Cowboy Casanova"
6. "If I Didn’t Love You"
7. "Wasted"
8. "She Don’t Know"
9. "Blown Away"
10. "Burn"
11. "Cry Pretty"
12. "Ghost Story"
13. "Two Black Cadillacs"
14. "Garden"
15. "Jesus, Take the Wheel"
16. "How Great Thou Art"
17. "Crazy Angels"
18. "Denim & Rhinestones"
19. "Flat on the Floor"
20. "Poor Everybody Else"
21. "Last Name"
22. "Something in the Water"

Encore

23. "Welcome to the Jungle" (Guns N' Roses cover)
24. "Before He Cheats"

== Tour dates ==
List of concerts
Date	City	Country	Venue	Supporting act
October 15, 2022	Greenville	United States	Bon Secours Wellness Arena	Jimmie Allen
October 17, 2022	Indianapolis	United States	Gainbridge Fieldhouse	Jimmie Allen
October 18, 2022	Grand Rapids	United States	Van Andel Arena	Jimmie Allen
October 20, 2022	Lexington	United States	Rupp Arena	Jimmie Allen
October 22, 2022	Rosemont	United States	Allstate Arena	Jimmie Allen
October 23, 2022	Milwaukee	United States	Fiserv Forum	Jimmie Allen
October 25, 2022	Minneapolis	United States	Target Center	Jimmie Allen
October 27, 2022	Grand Forks	United States	Alerus Center	Jimmie Allen
October 31, 2022	Tulsa	United States	BOK Center	Jimmie Allen
November 2, 2022	Austin	United States	Moody Center	Jimmie Allen
November 3, 2022	Houston	United States	Toyota Center	Jimmie Allen
November 5, 2022	New Orleans	United States	Smoothie King Center	Jimmie Allen
November 7, 2022	St. Louis	United States	Enterprise Center	Jimmie Allen
November 12, 2022	Moline	United States	Vibrant Arena at The MARK	Jimmie Allen
November 13, 2022	Kansas City	United States	T-Mobile Center	Jimmie Allen
November 15, 2022	Denver	United States	Ball Arena	Jimmie Allen
November 17, 2022	Salt Lake City	United States	Vivint Arena	Jimmie Allen
November 19, 2022	San Francisco	United States	Chase Center	Jimmie Allen
February 2, 2023	Miami	United States	Miami-Dade Arena	Jimmie Allen
February 4, 2023	Tampa	United States	Amalie Arena	Jimmie Allen
February 6, 2023	Jacksonville	United States	VyStar Veterans Memorial Arena	Jimmie Allen
February 7, 2023	Atlanta	United States	State Farm Arena	Jimmie Allen
February 8, 2023	Charlotte	United States	Spectrum Center	Jimmie Allen
February 10, 2023	University Park	United States	Bryce Jordan Center	Jimmie Allen
February 11, 2023	Uncasville	United States	Mohegan Sun Arena	Jimmie Allen
February 14, 2023	Charleston	United States	Charleston Coliseum	Jimmie Allen
February 15, 2023	Washington, D.C.	United States	Capital One Arena	Jimmie Allen
February 17, 2023	Boston	United States	TD Garden	Jimmie Allen
February 18, 2023	Newark	United States	Prudential Center	Jimmie Allen
February 21, 2023	New York City	United States	Madison Square Garden	Jimmie Allen
February 22, 2023	Philadelphia	United States	Wells Fargo Center	Jimmie Allen
February 24, 2023	Charlottesville	United States	John Paul Jones Arena	Jimmie Allen
February 25, 2023	Pittsburgh	United States	PPG Paints Arena	Jimmie Allen
February 26, 2023	Detroit	United States	Little Caesars Arena	Jimmie Allen
March 1, 2023	Nashville	United States	Bridgestone Arena	Jimmie Allen
March 2, 2023	Cincinnati	United States	Heritage Bank Center	Jimmie Allen
March 4, 2023	Columbus	United States	Nationwide Arena	Jimmie Allen
March 8, 2023	Dallas	United States	American Airlines Center	Jimmie Allen
March 11, 2023	Glendale	United States	Desert Diamond Arena	Jimmie Allen
March 13, 2023	Los Angeles	United States	Crypto.com Arena	Jimmie Allen
March 14, 2023	Sacramento	United States	Golden 1 Center	Jimmie Allen
March 16, 2023	Portland	United States	Moda Center	Jimmie Allen
March 17, 2023	Seattle	United States	Climate Pledge Arena	Jimmie Allen
