= Victory in Jesus =

Victory in Jesus can refer to:

- A shape note gospel song written by Eugene Monroe Bartlett and published in 1939
- A ministry founded by NASCAR driver Morgan Shepherd
- A daily radio and television broadcast by Billy Joe Daugherty
