= The Sound of Music: Music from the NBC Television Event =

2013 soundtrack album by various artists

Soundtrack album by Various artists
- Released: December 3, 2013
- Recorded: 2013
- Genre: Soundtrack; Musical theatre; Show tune
- Length: 61:22; 91:58 (with bonus disc)
- Label: Masterworks
- Producer: Doug Besterman; David Chase; Priscilla Taussig; Frank Wolf; Executive Producers: Craig Zadan; Neil Meron

The Sound of Music: Music from the NBC Television Event, also known as The Sound of Music: 2013 NBC Television Cast, or sometimes simply The Sound of Music, is a soundtrack album for The Sound of Music Live! released by Sony Masterworks on December 3, 2013. Released in CD and digital download formats, the album includes studio recordings instead of live tracks; the live performance was broadcast two days after the album release. A bonus compilation of nine instrumental tracks from the score was available exclusively through Walmart outlets. The album peaked at number 17 on the Billboard 200 and number 2 on the Billboard Soundtracks.

== Critical reception ==
Professional ratings
Review scores
Source	Rating
Allmusic	3/5 stars
Roughstock	4.5/5 stars

Stephen Thomas Erlewine of AllMusic gave the soundtrack three out of five stars and did not give much of a positive review. He stated that the soundtrack "is absent the one quality that made the televised musical so interesting: it is not recorded live; it was cut in the studio" and stated that by doing so the cast are showing how they "are throwing themselves into their roles." Erlewine did however praise them for staying true to the original Broadway musical and the film by stating "the arrangements are faithful to either the original Broadway production or, most often, the 1965 film -- which is appropriate" and concluded by stating "This 2013 staging is a nostalgic celebration of one of the most beloved 20th century musicals and it does right by its source material." Matt Bjorke of Roughstock praised Underwood's vocals stating "She really suits musical theater (much like she’s a classical country singer at heart). Her pure and pristine voice simply shines on songs like "The Sound of Music" and "My Favorite Things" (with Audra McDonald). Bjorke also predicted that the album would do well due to Underwood's appearance on the soundtrack and stating her duets with Moyer and Rinehart "are equally strong and beautifully crafted with musical director/conductor David Chase." He also stated that Borle's, McDonald's and Benanti's appearances would "help the soundtrack give fans something to enjoy long after the live event concludes." Bjorke concluded by stating "This is an iconic Broadway production and while there has been some ‘worry’ that they'll mess it up, this soundtrack should easily put those worries to rest and it should give fans excitement that Carrie Underwood could one day headline a Broadway production if she so chooses to do so."

== Track listing ==
All tracks are written by Rodgers and Hammerstein, except tracks 10, 11, 15 and 22 which are written solely by Richard Rodgers.

Standard
No.	Title	Recording Artist(s)	Length
1.	"Preludium"	Audra McDonald; Christiane Noll; Jessica Molaskey; Elena Shaddow; The Nuns of Nonnberg Abbey	2:56
2.	"The Sound of Music"	Carrie Underwood	3:06
3.	"Maria"	McDonald; Noll; Molaskey; Shaddow	3:15
4.	"My Favorite Things"	McDonald; Underwood	3:02
5.	"Do-Re-Mi"	Underwood; Ariane Rinehart; Michael Nigro; Ella Watts-Gorman; Joe West; Sophia Caruso, Grace Rundhaug; Peyton Ella	5:01
6.	"Sixteen Going on Seventeen"	Rinehart; Michael Campayno	5:11
7.	"The Lonely Goatherd"	Underwood; Rinehart; Nigro; Watts-Gorman; West; Caruso; Rundhaug; Ella	3:28
8.	"How Can Love Survive?"	Laura Benanti; Christian Borle	3:06
9.	"The Sound of Music" (Reprise)	Stephen Moyer; Rinehart; Nigro; Watts-Gorman; West; Caruso; Rundhaug; Ella	2:07
10.	"The Grand Waltz (Instrumental)"	David Chase	1:29
11.	"Ländler (Instrumental)"	Chase	2:00
12.	"So Long, Farewell"	Rinehart; Nigro; Watts-Gorman; West; Caruso; Rundhaug; Ella	2:54
13.	"Climb Ev'ry Mountain"	McDonald	2:46
14.	"No Way to Stop It"	Benanti; Borle; Moyer	3:08
15.	"Something Good"	Underwood; Moyer	2:54
16.	"Processional & Maria" (The Wedding)	McDonald; Noll; Molaskey; Shaddow; The Nuns of Nonnberg Abbey	2:48
17.	"Sixteen Going on Seventeen" (Reprise)	Underwood; Rinehart	2:12
18.	"Do-Re-Mi" (Reprise) (The Concert)	Moyer; Underwood; Rinehart; Nigro; Watts-Gorman; West; Caruso; Rundhaug; Ella	1:18
19.	"Edelweiss" (The Concert)	Moyer; Underwood; Rinehart; Nigro; Watts-Gorman; West; Caruso; Rundhaug; Ella	2:09
20.	"So Long, Farewell" (Reprise) (The Concert)	Moyer; Underwood; Rinehart; Nigro; Watts-Gorman; West; Caruso; Rundhaug; Ella	1:59
21.	"Climb Ev'ry Mountain" (Finale Ultimo)	McDonald; Noll; Molaskey; Shaddow; The Nuns of Nonnberg Abbey	1:37
22.	"End Credits (Instrumental)"	Chase	2:56
Total length:			61:22

Walmart exclusive sing-a-long bonus disc
No.	Title	Length
1.	"My Favorite Things" (Sing-A-Long)	3:03
2.	"Do-Re-Mi" (Sing-A-Long)	5:02
3.	"Sixteen Going on Seventeen" (Sing-A-Long)	5:11
4.	"The Lonely Goatherd" (Sing-A-Long)	3:28
5.	"The Sound of Music" (Sing-A-Long)	3:06
6.	"So Long, Farewell" (Sing-A-Long)	2:54
7.	"Climb Ev'ry Mountain" (Sing-A-Long)	2:47
8.	"Something Good" (Sing-A-Long)	2:55
9.	"Edelweiss" (Sing-A-Long)	2:10
Total length:		30:36

== Credits and personnel ==
Credits and personnel:

On instruments

- John Allred – trombone
- Erin Benim – violin
- Keith Bonner – flute, piccolo
- Laura Bontrager – cello
- David Byrd-Marrow – horn
- Sean Carney – violin
- Lynne Cohen – oboe, English horn
- Jason Covey – trumpet
- David Creswell – viola
- Jonathan Dinklage – violin
- Dominic Derasse – trumpet
- Carla Fabiani – viola
- Gareth Flowers – trumpet
- Bill Hayes – percussion
- JJ Johnson – viola
- Susan Jolles – harp
- Steve Kenyon – clarinet
- Shinwon Kim – violin
- Aaron Korn – horn
- Adam Krauthamer – horn
- Michael Kuennen – bass
- Scott Kuney – guitar
- Matt Lehmann – violin
- Jonathan Levine – clarinet
- Elizabeth Lim-Dutton – violin
- Lisa Matricardi – violin
- Nat Mayland – trombone
- Maxim Mostom – violin
- Matt Perri – celesta, organ
- Marcus Rojas – tuba
- John Romeri – flute
- Rich Rosenzweig – percussion
- Sarah Seiver – cello
- Daniel Sullivan – bassoon
- Mineko Yajima – violin

Sounding

- Laura Benanti – lead vocals (tracks 8, 14)
- Christian Borle – lead vocals (tracks 8, 14)
- Michael Campayno – lead vocals (track 6)
- Sophia Caruso – children's group vocals (tracks 5, 7, 12, 18–20)
- Peyton Ella – children's group vocals (tracks 5, 7, 12, 18–20)
- Audra McDonald – lead vocals (tracks 1, 3–4, 13, 21), background vocals (3)
- Jessica Molaskey – lead & background vocals (track 3)
- Stephen Moyer – lead vocals (tracks 9, 14–15, 18–20)
- Michael Nigro – children's group vocals (tracks 5, 7, 12, 18–20)
- Christiane Noll – background & additional lead vocals (track 3)
- Ariane Rinehart – lead vocals (track 6, 17), children's group vocals (5, 7, 12, 18–20)
- Grace Rundhaug – children's group vocals (tracks 5, 7, 12, 18–20)
- Elena Shaddow – background & additional lead vocals (track 3)
- The Sound of Music Television Cast Ensemble – choir/chorus
- The Sound of Music Television Orchestra – orchestral accompaniment (tracks 1–9, 12–21), All instruments performed by (10–11, 22)
- Carrie Underwood – primary artist, lead vocals (tracks 2, 4–5, 7, 15, 17–20)
- Ella Watts-Gorman – children's group vocals (tracks 5, 7, 12, 18–20)
- Joe West – children's group vocals (tracks 5, 7, 12, 18–20)
- The Nuns of Nonnberg Abbey (background vocals) - Cameron Adams, Margot De La Barre, Wendi Bergamini, Ashley Brown, Stowe Brown, Catherine Brunell, Paula Leggett Chase, Nikki Renee Daniels, Adrienne Danrich, Gina Ferrall, Joy Hermalyn, Leah Horowitz, Autumn Hulbert, Andrea Jones-Sojola, Sydney Morton, Linda Mugleston, Laura Shoop, Georgia Stitt, Rema Webb (tracks 1, 16, 21)

Managerial

- Anixter Rice Music Service - music preparation
- Rob Ashford – stage direction
- David Chase - music direction, music supervisor
- Randy Cohen – keyboard programming
- Reuben Cohen – mastering
- Howard Joines – music coordinator
- Fred Lassen – associate music supervisor
- Jennifer Liebeskind – product development
- Gavin Lurssen – mastering
- Marty Maidenberg – project consultant
- Beth McCarthy-Miller – stage direction
- George Stitt - nun caption
- Janet Weber – recording production manager
- Ian Weinberger – music assistant
- Emily Bruskin Yarbrough - concert master

Technical and production

- Doug Besterman – orchestration, producer
- David Channing – score editor
- David Chase – conductor, producer, synopsis
- Tyler Hartman – assistant engineer, additional vocal recording
- Steven Malone – children's choirmaster
- Neil Meron – executive producer
- Cathleen Murphy – A&R
- Nate Odden – assistant engineer
- Priscilla Taussig – producer
- Frank Wolf – engineer, mixing, producer, recording
- Craig Zadan – executive producer

Visuals and imagery

- Ted Chapin – liner notes
- Russel Crouse – book
- Autumn de Wilde – photography
- Russ Elliott – photography
- Oscar Hammerstein II – lyricist
- Howard Lindsay – book
- Scott McDaniel – cover design
- Nino Muñoz – cover photo
- Patrick Randak – photography
- Richard Rodgers – composer, lyricist (track 15 only)
- Giovanni Rufino – photography
- Federico Ruiz – design
- Robert Trachtenberg – photography

== Sales and chart performance ==
The album debuted on the Billboard 200 chart at number 17 with sales of 38,000. On December 21, 2013, the soundtrack debuted at number 2 on the Billboard Soundtracks chart. The following week the soundtrack held the number 2 spot on the Billboard Soundtracks chart, as well as its third week on the chart. It has sold 103,000 copies in the US as of January 2, 2014.

=== Weekly charts ===
Chart (2013–14)	Peak position
US Billboard 200	17
US Billboard Soundtracks	2

=== Year-end charts ===
Chart (2014)	Position
US Billboard 200	197
US Soundtrack Albums (Billboard)	8

== Release history ==
Release date and formats for The Sound of Music: Music from the NBC Television Event
Region	Date	Format	Label	Ref.
United States	December 3, 2013	CD; digital download; streaming	Masterworks	

== See also ==
- Carrie Underwood discography
- List of songs recorded by Carrie Underwood
