= Out of That Truck =

Single by Carrie Underwood

from the album Denim & Rhinestones (deluxe)
- Released: June 5, 2023
- Studio: Blackbird (Nashville, Tennessee)
- Length: 2:57
- Label: Capitol Nashville
- Songwriters: David Garcia; Carrie Underwood; Lydia Vaughn
- Producers: David Garcia; Carrie Underwood

Carrie Underwood singles chronology
"Hate My Heart" (2022)	"Out of That Truck" (2023)	"Leave a Light On (Talk Away the Dark)" (2024)

Lyric video
- "Out of That Truck" on YouTube

"Out of That Truck" is a song co-written and recorded by Carrie Underwood. It was first released to digital download and streaming services on March 10, 2023, before being released to country radio on June 5 as the third single from her ninth studio album, Denim & Rhinestones (2022). The song was released as a bonus track on the album's deluxe reissue.

== Content ==
Underwood co-wrote and produced "Out of That Truck" with David Garcia, with additional writing by Lydia Vaughn. She recorded the song with Jeff Balding at Blackbird in Nashville, TN. The song features a driving tempo and guitar-heavy production, while the subject matter has been compared to Underwood's previous single "Ghost Story" in that it details a post-breakup warning for her ex that he'll have trouble shaking her memory every time he goes for a ride in his pickup truck. On her inspiration for the song, Underwood described it as "basically just about the physical markers that somebody can leave behind in your life, and I feel like we've all got those to some extent. Whether you're like walking through the house that you grew up in and you see things of your parents or some book or piece of jewelry or something that it's like, those things remind you of somebody. I feel like if you grew up in a small town like I did, you spend a lot of time in your vehicle. When I think back to friends or people that I dated or whatever, it's kind of like you remember being with them in vehicles, and if you have something that you've had for a long time, you can definitely kind of look over to the seat next to you and almost see the other person there. So, that's kind of what it's all about, you know, a love that is no more, but you've kind of left your mark everywhere".

== Live performances ==
Underwood performed the song live at the Grand Ole Opry on May 15, 2023 and on June 6, 2023. She also performed the song on the Today show on September 14, 2023. She included the song during a return to Good Morning America on August 2, 2024.

== Personnel ==
Credits were adapted from the liner notes of the deluxe edition of Denim & Rhinestones.

- Drew Bollman – recording
- Dave Cohen – keyboard
- Jim Cooley – mixing
- David Garcia – keyboard, electric guitar, programming, producer, songwriter
- Zach Kuhlman – assistant mixing
- Joe LaPorta – mastering
- Rob McNelley – electric guitar
- Jerry Roe – drums
- Jimmie Lee Sloas – bass
- Ilya Toshinskiy – acoustic guitar
- Carrie Underwood – lead vocals, background vocals, producer, songwriter
- Lyrdia Vaughan – songwriter
- Derek Wells – electric guitar

== Charts ==
Chart performance
Chart (2023–2024)	Peak position
Canada Country (Billboard)	9
US Digital Song Sales (Billboard)	20
US Hot Country Songs (Billboard)	38
US Country Airplay (Billboard)	18

== Certifications ==
Certifications and sales
Region	Certification	Certified units/sales
United States (RIAA)	Gold	500,000^{‡}
^{‡} Sales+streaming figures based on certification alone.

== Release history ==
Release dates and formats
Region	Date	Format	Label	Ref.
United States	March 10, 2023	Digital download; streaming	Capitol Nashville	
United States	June 5, 2023	Country radio	Capitol Nashville	
