= Hate My Heart =

Single by Carrie Underwood

from the album Denim & Rhinestones
- Released: October 31, 2022
- Studio: Blackbird (Nashville, Tennessee); The Castle (Franklin, Tennessee)
- Length: 3:03
- Label: Capitol Nashville
- Songwriters: David Garcia; Michael Hardy; Hillary Lindsey; Carrie Underwood
- Producers: David Garcia; Carrie Underwood

Carrie Underwood singles chronology
"Ghost Story" (2022)	"Hate My Heart" (2022)	"Out of That Truck" (2023)

Music video
- "Hate My Heart" on YouTube

"Hate My Heart" is a song written by Carrie Underwood, Hillary Lindsey, Michael Hardy, and David Garcia. It was released as the second single from Underwood's ninth studio album, Denim & Rhinestones. Underwood co-wrote the song with David Garcia, Michael Hardy, and Hillary Lindsey, while she co-produced it with Garcia. "Hate My Heart" reached number 20 on the US Country Airplay chart.

== Background and composition ==
Underwood recorded "Hate My Heart" with Jeff Balding at Blackbird and the Castle Recording Studios, in Nashville, TN and Franklin, TN, respectively. The song is second single from her ninth studio album, Denim & Rhinestones, and it is told from the point of view of a character who is regretful over her breakup, wishing she could move on. "'Hate My Heart' was definitely part of my desire to have fun on this album," Underwood said via a statement. "I wanted songs that would be exciting to perform live and would fill up an arena, and that's exactly what we're about to do with the Denim & Rhinestones Tour. This one is definitely going to get everyone up on their feet and having a good time. It was great writing 'Hate My Heart' with Hillary Lindsey and David Garcia, who I love collaborating with, and also getting to work with Hardy, who brought a cool vibe and an energy to the track." She further stated: "I have a love for 90's and 2000s rock as well as 90's and 2000s country. I feel like I kind of married those genres and times together. It is a super fun song that I feel like accomplished everything that I wanted to accomplish."

== Music video ==
The music video for "Hate My Heart" was directed by Shaun Silva and premiered on November 2, 2022. It depicts Underwood and four friends as each go through a breakup. They end up at the Wildhorse Saloon in Nashville for a girls' night, where an all-female band (made up of doppelgangers of Underwood and her friends) is playing.

== Live performances ==
Underwood performed the song at the Country Music Association Awards on November 9, 2022. The song was included in the setlist for the Denim & Rhinestones Tour. She performed it at the 2023 CMT Music Awards.

== Charts ==
Chart performance
Chart (2022–2023)	Peak position
Canada Country (Billboard)	24
US Country Airplay (Billboard)	20
