= Denim & Rhinestones =

- Standard cover

Studio album by Carrie Underwood
- Released: June 10, 2022
- Studios: Blackbird; East Iris; Ocean Way Nashville (Nashville, Tennessee); Amalie Arena (Tampa, Florida); The Castle; Rock the Soul (Franklin, Tennessee); Soultrain Sound (Berry Hill, Tennessee)
- Genres: Country; country-pop
- Length: 37:56
- Label: Capitol Nashville
- Producers: David Garcia; Carrie Underwood

Carrie Underwood chronology
| My Savior (2021) | Denim & Rhinestones (2022) | Music Up, Windows Down (2025) |

Singles from Denim & Rhinestones
- 1. "Ghost Story" Released: March 18, 2022; 2. "Hate My Heart" Released: October 31, 2022

Singles from Denim & Rhinestones (Deluxe)
- 1. "Out of That Truck" Released: June 5, 2023

Denim & Rhinestones is the ninth studio album by American singer Carrie Underwood. It was released on June 10, 2022, through Capitol Records Nashville. The album was recorded with production from David Garcia, who previously produced Cry Pretty (2018) and My Savior (2021), with co-production from Underwood as well. The album entered the top ten in the United States, and the top 40 in Scotland, Australia, and Canada. It failed to enter the UK Albums Chart, but entered at number one on the UK Country Albums chart.

Denim & Rhinestones contains twelve tracks, eleven of which were co-written by Underwood and features the singles "Ghost Story" and "Hate My Heart", the former of which is the only track that Underwood did not have a hand in writing. A deluxe reissue of the album featuring "Out of That Truck" and several additional tracks was released on September 22, 2023.

== Background ==
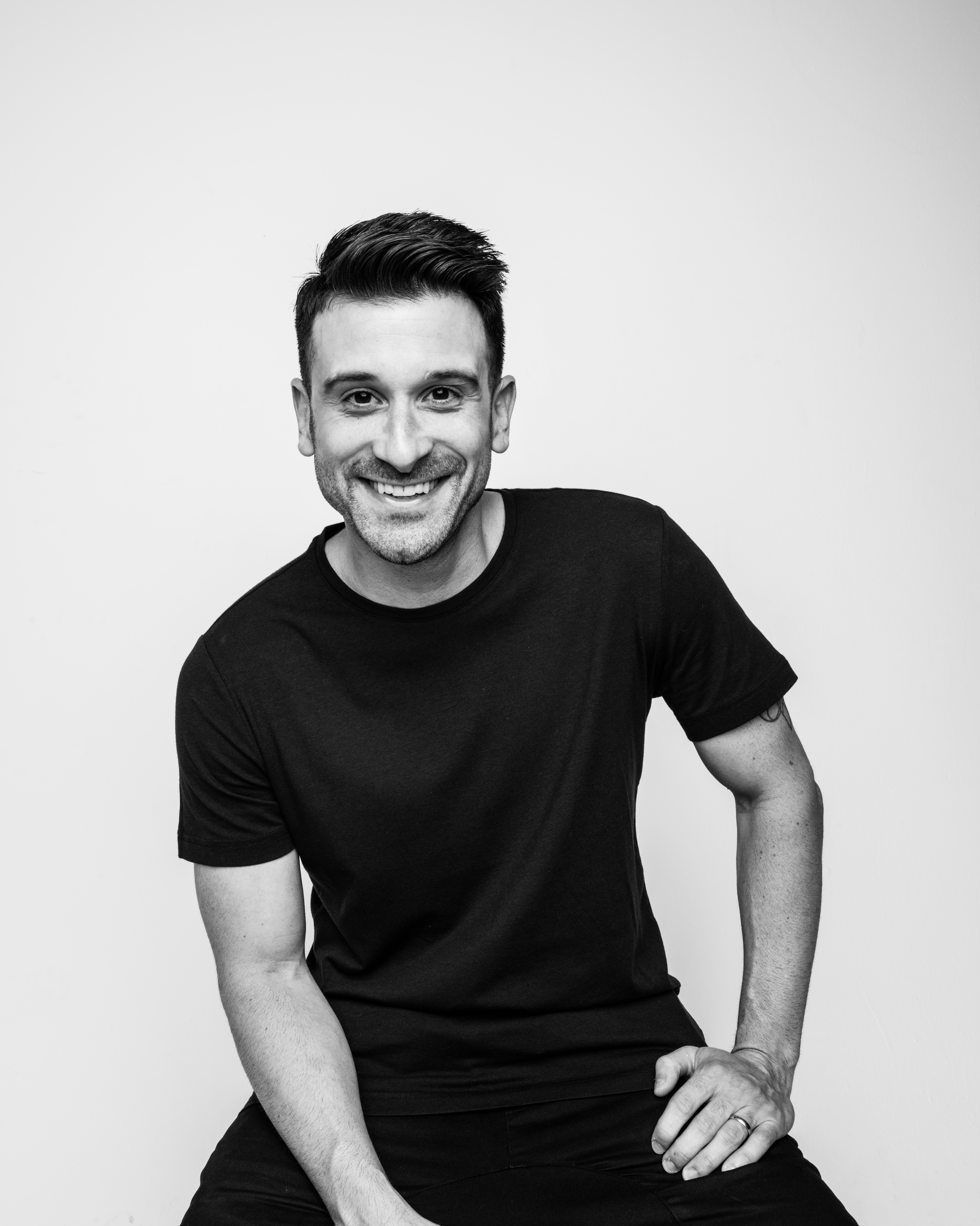
Underwood co-wrote the songs with David Garcia (pictured).

On March 18, Underwood described the album's overall atmosphere as one intended to make listeners feel "happy" and give them "warm fuzzies", characterizing it as the kind of record meant for casual, private enjoyment—music to sing along to "in your house" or "in your room". She later elaborated that, when beginning work on the album, she and her co-producer and co-writer David Garcia focused primarily on what she wanted creatively, explaining that her main intention was simply to "have fun" during the process. In the album, Underwood co-wrote eleven of the twelve songs.

In April, Underwood discussed the album's title track, describing it as "super fun" with a subtle retro feel, and explained that its central idea revolves around elements that naturally lgo together". She likened this pairing to familiar combinations, and noted that the song—and by extension the album—captures a sense of cohesion, where distinct parts feel complete once brought together. When the album's trailer premiered on April 8, Underwood explained that the record "covers a lot of ground", blending songs with a "throwback" sensibility and a contemporary sound. She noted that her upbringing with many different kinds of music is clearly reflected across the album, and she described the project as a broad reflection of both her personality and artistic identity. When asked about the lead single "Ghost Story", Underwood spoke highly of its songwriters Josh Kear, Hillary Lindsey, and Garcia, describing them as "talented" collaborators who understand her well, and noted that she felt immediately compelled to record the song from the first time she heard it.

In September 2022, Underwood spoke further about the album, explaining that the current music landscape made it "easier than ever" to move fluidly between styles, as listeners freely engage with different genres depending on their mood. She noted that influences from a wide range of artists naturally "work their way in", and it allowed her to embrace sounds beyond country without "fighting it", which she felt ultimately expanded her artistic identity. According to Underwood, the album reflects "different parts" of herself, and it enables her to explore more sides of her music and songwriting while remaining cohesive, even as it brings together varied influences.

== Composition ==
Following Underwood's two previous albums, My Gift (2020) and My Savior (2021), Denim & Rhinestones marks her first country and country-pop album. According to Riff magazine, the album is "more garish" than her previous releases, with the sound "integrat[ing] the imagery of flashy jean jackets and dripping jewelry". About the album's concept, she said the album was conceived with enjoyment as its primary aim, describing having "fun from the get-go" as the central mission. She characterized the record as carrying a sense of "vintage sparkle", which blends influences from 1970s textures, 1980s pop, 1990s rock, and contemporary country, rather than adhering to a strict throwback approach. According to Underwood, the goal was to create music that "felt good" while drawing on a broad range of retro-inspired sounds.

== Promotion ==
Underwood gave the debut performance of "Ghost Story" at the Grammy Awards on April 3, 2022 and the second performance of the song at the 2022 CMT Music Awards, which aired on April 11. The album's title track, "Denim & Rhinestones", was released on April 8, 2022, as the first promotional single alongside an accompanying lyric video. Another promotional single, titled "Crazy Angels", was released on April 22, 2022. Underwood performed these two promotional singles as well as "Ghost Story", during her set at Stagecoach Festival on April 30. A third promotional single, "She Don't Know", was made available to stream on May 20. On June 9, Underwood performed a concert inside Nashville, Tennessee's historic Bell Tower, which included new songs from the album. A day later, she performed two new songs on Good Morning America.

During the week of the 2022 CMA Music Festival, a pop-up exhibit called the Denim & Rhinestones Experience opened to the public. The exhibit includes interactive photo installations and wardrobe displays, alongside a retail boutique designed to celebrate the music and visual world of Denim & Rhinestones. On June 11, Underwood was the closing headliner for CMA Music Fest, with approximately 64,000 in attendance. On June 14, she performed "Pink Champagne" on The Tonight Show Starring Jimmy Fallon. At the end of June, Underwood made multiple appearances in London to promote the album, including appearing on Lorraine. The track "Pink Champagne" was released as a promotional single in Australia. On August 19 and 20, she performed four shows at the Grand Ole Opry and included new songs, such as "Ghost Story", "Velvet Heartbreak", "Hate My Heart", and "Burn". She included new songs during her set at the Iowa State Fair on August 21, with 14,000 in attendance. On September 29, Underwood partnered with iHeartRadio to perform an hour-long concert that included new songs. In November, she appeared at the American Music Awards, performing "Crazy Angels" in an aerial cage.

On June 9, 2023, Underwood released "Take Me Out" as a promotional single for the deluxe re-release of the album. On August 11, Underwood released "Give Her That" as the second promotional single for the deluxe edition. The deluxe edition was released on September 22, including six additional tracks.

=== Singles and tour ===
"Ghost Story" served as the lead single from Denim & Rhinestones, released on March 18, 2022. It peaked at number six on the US Country Airplay in the fall, becoming Underwood's thirtieth top ten hit. On October 11, "Hate My Heart" was announced; it was released as the album's second single and impacted country radio on October 31. The song peaked at number 20 on the US Country Airplay chart. Underwood released "Out of That Truck" to digital and streaming services on March 10, 2023, as a promotional single. On June 5, it was sent to country radio station, being the first single of album's deluxe edition as well as overall third single of the album. The song became a top 20 hit on the US Billboard Country Airplay chart.

On May 16, 2022, Underwood announced the Denim & Rhinestones Tour with special guest Jimmie Allen. The tour began on October 15, 2022, in Greenville, South Carolina and concluded on March 17, 2023, in Seattle, Washington.

== Critical reception ==
Professional ratings
Review scores
| Source | Rating |
|---|---|
| AllMusic | 4/5 stars |
| Riff Magazine | 8/10 |

Upon release, the album received generally positive reviews from critics. Stephen Thomas Erlewine of AllMusic praised its glossy production, describing its surfaces as "buffed so brilliantly", while highlighting Underwood's vocal control across power ballads, arena-ready tracks, and more tender moments. Toronto Sun editor Mark Daniell noted that, following decades of commercial success, Underwood moves confidently through a stylistically varied set that "pulsates with real joy", blending synth-pop, soul, and country influences. Outsider author Lauren Boisvert framed the record as a mature continuation of Underwood's earlier work, likening it to Carnival Ride (2007) or Some Hearts (2005) but "matured like a fine wine", while Riff Magazine's Domenic Strazzabosco echoed the singer's stated aim of having fun, suggesting that without its distinctly country lyrics, the album could verge on rock and roll. Lesley Janes from The Nash News similarly observed that Denim & Rhinestones brings together Underwood's favored influences, combining rhythmic pop, rock 'n' roll, and traditional country into a cohesive whole.

== Commercial performance ==
Denim & Rhinestones debuted at number ten on the US Billboard 200, earning 31,000 album-equivalent units with 22,000 pure album sales. It also debuted at number two on the Top Country Albums, marking Underwood's tenth top ten album on the Billboard 200 chart and tenth top three Billboard Country album. In the United Kingdom and Australia, Denim & Rhinestones topped the UK Country Albums and Australian Country Albums chart, respetively. In the former, it reached number 8 on the UK Albums Downloads and number 18 on the UK Albums Sales Charts. The album also made the top 40 in Australia, Canada, and Scotland.

== Awards and nominations ==
50th American Music Awards

| Year | Award | Category | Result | Ref. |
|---|---|---|---|---|
| 2022 | Denim & Rhinestones | Favorite Album - Country | Nominated | |

People's Choice Country Awards

| Year | Award | Category | Result | Ref. |
|---|---|---|---|---|
| 2023 | The Denim & Rhinestones Tour | Tour Event of the Year | Nominated | |

== Track listing ==
Standard edition
| No. | Title | Writer(s) | Length |
|---|---|---|---|
| 1. | "Denim & Rhinestones" | Carrie Underwood; David Garcia; Josh Kear; Hillary Lindsey | 2:48 |
| 2. | "Velvet Heartbreak" | Underwood; Garcia; Lindsey | 3:03 |
| 3. | "Ghost Story" | Garcia; Lindsey; Kear | 3:01 |
| 4. | "Hate My Heart" | Underwood; Garcia; Michael Hardy; Lindsey | 3:03 |
| 5. | "Burn" | Underwood; Garcia; Lindsey; Ashley Gorley | 3:10 |
| 6. | "Crazy Angels" | Underwood; Garcia; Lydia Vaughan | 2:36 |
| 7. | "Faster" | Underwood; Garcia; Lindsey | 3:17 |
| 8. | "Pink Champagne" | Underwood; Garcia; Lindsey; Gorley | 3:23 |
| 9. | "Wanted Woman" | Underwood; Garcia; Josh Miller | 3:19 |
| 10. | "Poor Everybody Else" | Underwood; Miller; Chris DeStefano | 3:45 |
| 11. | "She Don't Know" | Underwood; Garcia; Lindsey | 3:29 |
| 12. | "Garden" | Underwood; Garcia; Miller | 3:02 |
| Total length: | | | 37:56 |

Deluxe edition
| No. | Title | Writer(s) | Length |
|---|---|---|---|
| 13. | "Out of That Truck" | Underwood; Garcia; Vaughan | 2:57 |
| 14. | "Give Her That" | Underwood; Garcia; Vaughan | 3:22 |
| 15. | "Drunk and Hungover" | Nicolle Galyon; Lindsey; Jordan Reynolds | 3:04 |
| 16. | "Damage" | Underwood; Garcia; Lindsey | 2:48 |
| 17. | "Take Me Out" | Underwood; Garcia; Lindsey | 4:03 |
| 18. | "She Don't Know" (live from the Denim & Rhinestones Tour) | Underwood; Garcia; Lindsey | 4:01 |
| Total length: | | | 58:10 |

== Credits and personnel ==
Credits were adapted from the liner notes.

=== Recording locations ===
- Blackbird Studio; Nashville, Tennessee (all tracks)
- The Castle Recording Studios; Franklin, Tennessee (1–12)
- Amalie Arena; Tampa, Florida (18)
- Rock the Soul; Franklin, Tennessee (additional recording)
- Soultrain Sound Studios; Berry Hill, Tennessee (additional recording)
- East Iris Studios; Nashville, Tennessee (additional recording)
- Ocean Way Nashville; Nashville, Tennessee (additional recording)

=== Musicians ===
- Carrie Underwood – lead vocals, background vocals
- David Garcia – electric guitar, programming, keyboards (1, 3–7, 9), acoustic guitar (2, 5, 6, 8, 12), bass guitar (5, 7, 8), mandolin (6, 7), ganjo (8), dobro (8)
- Dave Cohen – keyboards, programming (5)
- Ilya Toshinsky – acoustic guitar, mandolin (2, 3, 6, 7, 11), electric guitar (5, 7), ganjo (8), dobro (8)
- Jimmie Lee Sloas – bass guitar
- Aaron Sterling – drums (1, 8), percussion (1, 8)
- Derek Wells – electric guitar
- Rob McNelley – electric guitar (1–4, 6, 7, 10–12)
- Bryan Sutton – acoustic guitar (2, 5, 12), dobro (12)
- Hillary Lindsey – background vocals (2–4, 11)
- Jerry Roe – drums (2–7, 10, 11), percussion (10, 11)
- Alex Wright – keyboards (3, 5)
- Sol Philcox-Littlefield – electric guitar (5, 9, 10, 12)
- Fred Eltringham – drums (9, 12)
- Chris DeStefano – background vocals (10)
- Charlie Worsham – acoustic guitar (11)
- Stuart Duncan – fiddle (11)

=== Technical ===
- Joe LaPorta – mastering
- Serban Ghenea – mixing, engineering (1, 8)
- F. Reid Shippen – mixing, engineering (2, 11)
- Justin Niebank – mixing, engineering (3)
- Jim Cooley – mixing, engineering (4–6, 10)
- Dave Clauss – mixing, engineering (7, 9, 12)
- David Garcia – engineering, editing
- Jeff Balding – engineering
- Kam Luchterhand – engineering
- Bryan David Willis – editing
- Trey Keller – editing
- Drew Bollman – additional mixing (3)
- Bryce Bordone – additional engineering, mixing assistance (1, 8)
- Brandon Towles – additional engineering, mixing assistance (2, 11)
- Zach Kuhlman – additional engineering, mixing assistance (4–6, 10)
- Michael Walter – engineering assistance

== Charts ==
=== Weekly charts ===
| Chart (2022) | Peak position |
|---|---|
| Australian Albums (ARIA) | 21 |
| Australian Country Albums (ARIA) | 1 |
| Canadian Albums (Billboard) | 33 |
| Scottish Albums (Official Charts) | 40 |
| UK Album Downloads (Official Charts) | 8 |
| UK Albums Sales (OCC) | 18 |
| UK Country Albums (OCC) | 1 |
| US Billboard 200 | 10 |
| US Top Country Albums (Billboard) | 2 |

=== Year-end charts ===
| Chart (2022) | Position |
|---|---|
| US Top Current Album Sales (Billboard) | 77 |
| US Top Country Albums (Billboard) | 64 |

== Release history ==
| Region | Date | Format | Edition | Label | Ref. |
|---|---|---|---|---|---|
| United States | June 10, 2022 | Cassette; CD; digital download; streaming; vinyl | Standard | Capitol Nashville | |
| United States | September 22, 2023 | CD; digital download; streaming; vinyl | Deluxe | Capitol Nashville | |
