= My Savior (album) =

2021 studio album by Carrie Underwood

Studio album by Carrie Underwood
- Released: March 26, 2021
- Genres: Christian country; gospel
- Length: 49:47
- Label: Capitol Nashville
- Producers: David Garcia; Carrie Underwood

Carrie Underwood chronology
My Gift (2020)	My Savior (2021)	Denim & Rhinestones (2022)

My Savior is the eighth studio album by American singer Carrie Underwood. It was released on March 26, 2021, through Capitol Records Nashville. The gospel album features thirteen tracks, with production from Underwood and David Garcia, who co-produced Underwood's sixth studio album, Cry Pretty (2018). The album debuted at number four on the US Billboard 200.

== Background and composition ==
Following the release of her first Christmas album, My Gift, in September 2020, amid the COVID-19 pandemic, Underwood decided to record an album of gospel covers, saying, "This album is one that I have always wanted to make. This is legacy stuff to me." In January 2021, Underwood shared with People, "With everything I do, I just want to be positive. And we had the Christmas album, which was so near and dear to my heart. Last year was a tough year for everybody, and I think just wanting to be positive in this world and sing these songs that bring me so much joy, hopefully, others can be like that as well and these songs can bring others joy. That goes back with everything that I do...I just want to do positive things." Further expanding on her reasoning behind producing a Christian album, Underwood said, "It's been such a blessing to make music like this, inspirational music that is near and dear to my heart. These two albums have been on my musical bucket list since the beginning of my career and were planned long before the events of the past year, but somehow it feels like the perfect time to share these beloved songs with the world."

Bear Rinehart of Needtobreathe provided background vocals for "Nothing but the Blood of Jesus". Underwood described being nervous before asking CeCe Winans to duet with her for the album, saying, "We had talked about asking CeCe to come and sing something with me. We were trying to figure out the game plan, and I always get really nervous about asking people to come sing with me."

Underwood described her original plan for the album, later deciding to incorporate more modern production, saying, "My original thought was, 'We're going to be super traditional about everything.' And then we got into work on it. I'm like, 'Oh, man, a lot of these songs sound the same. Because a lot of them were written a very long time ago, there was only a certain amount of instrumentation available, and they obviously didn't have the technology that we have now.... We kind of wanted to keep the core and the heart true to what these songs are, and didn't want to 'jazz them up' too much. But we definitely wanted to make them really sound like they belonged many years ago and they belong today." Reflecting on including the song "Just as I Am", Underwood said, "All the times we sang that song, I never thought much of it, because it was always there. And now, as an adult, just as I am - He loves me just as I am. All my flaws, all my insecurities, all my mistakes. He loves me, and that is such a huge, huge realization as an adult."

== Promotion ==
On February 12, the track "Softly and Tenderly" was made available for streaming and purchase. On February 26, "Great Is Thy Faithfulness" was made available to stream. On March 10, "Nothing but the Blood of Jesus" became the third track available prior to the album's release. On March 26, she appeared on the Today show to perform two songs from the album, "Just as I Am" and "Victory in Jesus", and announced a live streaming event on Easter; on April 4, she performed songs from the album at the Ryman Auditorium. Donations of over $100,000 were raised from viewers during the live event for Save the Children. The event also featured special appearances by CeCe Winans and Bear Rinehart. At the 56th ACM awards Underwood performed a medley from the album, including a guest performance with Winans.

== Critical reception ==
Professional ratings
Review scores
Source	Rating
365 Days of Inspiring Media	4.5/5
AllMusic	3.5/5 stars
CCM Magazine	4/5 stars
Entertainment Weekly	A
Spectrum Culture	68/100

My Savior received positive reviews from music critics. Hilary Hughes of Entertainment Weekly graded the album an "A" and praised the production, writing, "With a sparse aesthetic that leans on acoustic arrangements and the strength of Underwood's voice, the listening experience is far closer to what one would find in a church service (that happened to feature a band of Nashville's finest players) than the massive sound of her previous albums." Riff Magazine gave a positive review of the album, writing, "For those familiar with the themes of the music of Carrie Underwood, it comes as no surprise that she's finally decided to record an album of gospel standards. Her newest album, My Savior, uses tinges of country and pop to fill out the album of traditional hymns, carried mostly by Underwood's ever graceful and soothing voice that propelled her up the charts more than 15 years ago." The website Worship Leader praised the album, writing, "All maintaining the traditional feel that has made these hymns stand the test of time, Underwood manages to put her own modern touch on each of these classic songs without losing one bit of their significant history." Country Universe rated the album 4 out of 5 stars, writing, "Overall, My Savior manages to convey her faith and her musicality in this album, without losing too much sincerity and heart." Spectrum Culture gave a more mixed review and rated the album 68% and stated, "These recordings have a particular audience in mind, and they probably suit that group perfectly. If Underwood plays it too safe on this record, at least she succeeds at producing an acceptable offering. Listeners (with ears to hear) will at least appreciate a remarkable vocalist following her particular calling."

== Accolades ==
Awards and nominations for My Savior
Year	Ceremony	Award	Result	Ref.
2021	GMA Dove Awards	Bluegrass/Country/Roots Album of the Year	Nominated	
2022	Grammy Awards	Best Roots Gospel Album	Won	
2022	Billboard Music Awards	Top Christian Album	Nominated	

== Commercial performance ==
The album debuted at number four on the Billboard 200, moving 73,000 units, of which 68,000 were physical albums, with over 5 million streams, and marked Underwood's ninth consecutive chart-topping album on the Top Country Albums chart. Underwood became the first artist in Billboard history to have nine consecutive albums debut at the top of the Country Albums chart. As of January 2022, the album has sold over 293,000 units in the United States.

== Track listing ==
My Savior track listing
No.	Title	Writer(s)	Length
1.	"Jesus Loves Me" (instrumental)	Anna Bartlett Warner; William Batchelder Bradbury	1:06
2.	"Nothing but the Blood of Jesus"	Robert Lowry	3:30
3.	"Blessed Assurance"	Fanny Crosby; Phoebe Knapp	3:57
4.	"Just as I Am"	Charlotte Elliott; Bradbury	3:16
5.	"Victory in Jesus"	Eugene Monroe Bartlett	4:15
6.	"Great Is Thy Faithfulness" (featuring CeCe Winans)	Thomas Chisholm; William M. Runyan	4:21
7.	"O How I Love Jesus"	Frederick Whitfield	3:26
8.	"How Great Thou Art"	Carl Boberg; Stuart K. Hine	5:20
9.	"Because He Lives"	Bill Gaither; Gloria Gaither	4:47
10.	"The Old Rugged Cross"	George Bennard	3:30
11.	"I Surrender All"	Judson W. Van DeVenter; Winfield S. Weeden	3:54
12.	"Softly and Tenderly"	Will Lamartine Thompson	5:29
13.	"Amazing Grace"	John Newton	2:56
Total length:			49:47

== Personnel ==
Credits were adapted from Tidal.

Musicians

- Buddy Greene – harmonica (1, 3, 13)
- Carrie Underwood – vocals (2–13), background vocals (2, 3, 5, 7, 9–11, 13), arrangement (2–7, 11)
- David Garcia – arrangement (2–7, 11), piano (2, 8, 11), background vocals (4), keyboards (7, 8), percussion (11)
- Charlie Worsham – acoustic guitar (2, 9), mandolin (2)
- Fred Eltringham – drums (2, 5, 8–11), percussion (2, 8, 9, 11)
- Derek Wells – electric guitar (2, 5, 8–11)
- Tom Bukovac – electric guitar (2, 8)
- Charlie Judge – keyboards (2, 5, 8–11)
- Jimmie Lee Sloas – acoustic bass guitar (2, 5), bass (8–11)
- Bryan Sutton – acoustic guitar (3, 4, 7, 11, 13), mandolin (7)
- Mac McAnally – acoustic guitar (4, 7), bouzouki (7)
- Dave Cohen – keyboards (4, 7), piano (8)
- Ilya Toshinsky – acoustic guitar (5, 8–11)
- Russ Pahl – pedal steel (5, 8–11)
- Bear Rinehart – background vocals (2)
- Sari Reist – cello (6, 12)
- Gordon Mote – piano (6, 12)
- Kris Wilkinson – string arrangement, viola (6, 12)
- Betsy Lamb – viola (6, 12)
- David Angell – violin (6, 12)
- Alicia Enstrom – violin (6, 12)
- Jun Iwasaki – violin (6, 12)
- David Davidson – violin (6, 12)
- CeCe Winans – vocals (6)
- Mateus Asato – electric guitar (9, 11)
- Brett James – background vocals (10)
- Ivey Childers – background vocals (13)

Technical

- Joe LaPorta – mastering
- David Garcia – mixer (1, 3); recording engineer, digital editing, vocal engineer (all tracks)
- F. Reid Shippen – mixer (2, 13)
- Manny Marroquin – mixer (4, 9, 11)
- Serban Ghenea – mixer (5–8, 12)
- Justin Niebank – mixer (10)
- Chris Galland – mix engineer (4, 9, 11)
- John Hanes – mix engineer (5–8, 12)
- Drew Bollman – recording engineer (all tracks), assistant mixer (10)
- Josh Ditty – recording engineer, string engineer (6, 12)
- Michael Mechling – assistant mixer (2)
- Jeremie Inhaber – assistant mixer (11)
- Robin Florent – assistant mixer (11)
- Scott Desmarais – assistant mixer (11)
- Kyle Blunt – assistant recording engineer
- Kam Luchterhand – assistant recording engineer
- Ryan Yount – assistant recording engineer (6, 12)

Design

- Joseph Llanes – cover photo
- Carole Underwood – back cover photo
- James White – art direction

== Charts ==
=== Weekly charts ===
Weekly chart performance for My Savior
Chart (2021)	Peak position
Australian Albums (ARIA)	54
Australian Country Albums (ARIA)	5
Canadian Albums (Billboard)	15
Scottish Albums (Official Charts)	26
UK Album Downloads (Official Charts)	22
UK Albums Sales (OCC)	27
UK Physical Albums (OCC)	35
UK Christian & Gospel Albums (OCC)	3
UK Country Albums (OCC)	1
US Billboard 200	4
US Top Christian Albums (Billboard)	1
US Top Country Albums (Billboard)	1

=== Year-end charts ===
Year-end chart performance for My Savior
Chart (2021)	Position
US Billboard 200	193
US Top Christian Albums (Billboard)	4
US Top Country Albums (Billboard)	33

== Certifications ==
Certifications for My Savior
Region	Certification	Certified units/sales
United States (RIAA)	Gold	500,000^{‡}
^{‡} Sales+streaming figures based on certification alone.
