= Hallelujah (Carrie Underwood song) =

2020 song by Carrie Underwood and John Legend

Single by Carrie Underwood and John Legend

from the album My Gift
- Released: November 13, 2020
- Recorded: 2020
- Studio: EastWest Studios (Los Angeles, CA)
- Genre: Christmas; pop
- Length: 4:35
- Label: Capitol Records Nashville
- Songwriters: John Stephens; Toby Gad; Leonard Cohen
- Producer: Greg Wells

Carrie Underwood singles chronology
"Drinking Alone" (2019)	"Hallelujah" (2020)	"If I Didn't Love You" (2021)

John Legend singles chronology
"Minefields" (2020)	"Hallelujah" (2020)	"In My Mind" (2021)

"Hallelujah" is a song recorded by American country music singer Carrie Underwood and R&B singer John Legend, appearing on Underwood's first full-length Christmas album, My Gift (2020).

== Background and composition ==
The song was written by Legend, Toby Gad and Leonard Cohen, and sent to Underwood late into the album-making process. Underwood said, "I was deep into making the album, and this one kind of came in. He sent it to us kind of at the end. It was like, 'Well, I love the song. I feel like this is a puzzle piece I didn't know was missing, but now that I've heard it, I have to have it. And so we just put the ask back, 'Thank you for sending, do you want to sing a part with me, too?'."

== Critical reception ==
"Hallelujah" received mostly positive reviews from music critics. Vinyl Chapters gave a positive review of the song, calling it a "breathtaking duet" between Underwood and Legend, and also a "notable standout track" from the album. The Washington Post highlighted the collaboration in its review of the album, writing, "These two Grammy winners push each other to new and impressive heights as they raise their voices to the heavens."

== Commercial performance ==
In the United States, "Hallelujah" reached number one on the Billboard Hot Christian Songs chart, becoming Underwood's third number one on that chart, and peaked at number three on both the Adult Contemporary chart and Hot Country Songs chart. It also peaked at number 54 on the Billboard Hot 100 chart.

== Music video ==
The official music video premiered on November 19. It was directed by Randee St. Nicholas. It depicts Underwood in a snowy forest until she joins Legend at a piano inside an old, abandoned church. There are flashes of people in the background with candles, as they attended the church in its former glory. There are also two live doves on Legend's piano during the video.

The video received two nominations and one win from the 2021 CMT Music awards. It was also nominated for Video of the Year at the 56th Academy of Country Music awards.

== Live performances ==
Underwood and Legend performed the song for Underwood's holiday special streaming on HBO Max: My Gift: A Christmas Special from Carrie Underwood. The duo performed the song again at the Global Citizen Prize 2020, which aired on December 19, 2020.

== Charts ==
=== Weekly charts ===
Weekly chart performance for "Hallelujah"
Chart (2020–21)	Peak position
Canada Digital Songs (Billboard)	22
Canada AC (Billboard)	42
Global 200 (Billboard)	126
US Billboard Hot 100	54
US Holiday 100 (Billboard)	39
US Hot Christian Songs (Billboard)	1
US Hot Country Songs (Billboard)	3
US Adult Contemporary (Billboard)	3
US Country Airplay (Billboard)	57

=== Year-end charts ===
Year-end chart performance for "Hallelujah"
Chart (2021)	Position
US Adult Contemporary (Billboard)	42
US Hot Christian Songs (Billboard)	26
US Hot Country Songs (Billboard)	98

== Certifications ==
Certifications for Hallelujah
Region	Certification	Certified units/sales
United States (RIAA)	Gold	500,000^{‡}
^{‡} Sales+streaming figures based on certification alone.

== Awards and nominations ==
Awards
Organization	Year	Award	Result	Ref
56th Academy of Country Music Awards	2021	Video of the Year	Nominated	
CMT Music Awards	2021	Video of the Year	Won	
CMT Music Awards	2021	Collaborative Video of the Year	Nominated	
