= Eugene Monroe Bartlett =

American gospel music songwriter and producer (1885–1941)

- Born: December 24, 1885; Waynesville, Pulaski County, Missouri
- Died: January 25, 1941 (aged 55)
- Education: Hall-Moody Institute; William Jewell College
- Occupations: Songwriter, publisher
- Spouse: Joan Tatum
- Children: Gene Bartlett Jr. Charles Bartlett

Eugene Monroe Bartlett Sr. (a.k.a. E.M. Bartlett) (December 24, 1885 – January 25, 1941) was an American Christian singer, songwriter and producer of gospel music. He wrote "Victory in Jesus".

== Early life ==
Eugene Monroe Bartlett Sr., was born on December 24, 1885, in Waynesville, Missouri. He grew up in Sebastian County, Arkansas. He attended the Hall-Moody Institute in Martin, Tennessee and graduated from William Jewell College in Liberty, Missouri.

== Career ==
Bartlett first worked for the Central Music Company, a shape note music publisher in Hartford, Arkansas. In 1918, with David Moore and John A. McClung, he co-founded the Hartford Music Company in Hartford. He served as its President from 1918 to 1935. Over the course of nearly two decades, he opened new branches in Nacogdoches, Texas and Hartshorne, Oklahoma.

He was the founder of the Hartford Music Institute in 1921. Five years later, he mentored Albert E. Brumley, who attended the institute.

He published The Herald of Song, a monthly magazine about gospel music.

A prolific songwriter, he wrote many Christian gospel songs such as Everybody Will Be Happy Over There, Just a Little While, He Will Remember Me, You Can’t Keep a Good Man Down, and Victory in Jesus. He also wrote the country music song Take an Old Cold Tater (and Wait), recorded by Little Jimmy Dickens.

== Personal life, death and legacy ==
Bartlett married Joan Tatum in 1917. They had two children: Gene Bartlett Jr., and Charles Bartlett.

Bartlett died on January 25, 1941. He was buried at Oak Hill Cemetery in Siloam Springs, Arkansas.

Bartlett was inducted into the Gospel Music Hall of Fame in Nashville, Tennessee in 1973. His Victory in Jesus appeared on Hymns, an album by Christian singer Michael W. Smith released in 2014.
