= Ghost Story (song) =

2022 single by Carrie Underwood

Single by Carrie Underwood

from the album Denim & Rhinestones
- Released: March 18, 2022
- Studio: Blackbird (Nashville, Tennessee); The Castle (Franklin, Tennessee)
- Length: 3:01
- Label: Capitol Nashville
- Songwriters: David Garcia; Josh Kear; Hillary Lindsey
- Producers: Carrie Underwood; David Garcia

Carrie Underwood singles chronology
"If I Didn't Love You" (2021)	"Ghost Story" (2022)	"Hate My Heart" (2022)

Music video
- "Ghost Story" on YouTube

"Ghost Story" is a song by American singer Carrie Underwood, released as the first single from her ninth studio album, Denim & Rhinestones. Written by Josh Kear, Hillary Lindsey, and David Garcia, it was released digitally on March 18, 2022.

== Writing and composition ==
"Ghost Story" was written by Josh Kear, Hillary Lindsey, and David Garcia, being the only song from the album that Underwood did not have a hand in writing. Underwood recorded the song with Jeff Balding at Blackbird and the Castle Recording Studios, in Nashville, TN and Franklin, TN, respectively. She said of the single, "Ghost Story is a thrilling, dramatic song that David, Hillary and Josh wrote for me. They are such talented, amazing songwriters who know me so well, and from the first time I heard it I knew I had to record it. I have always loved performing songs that tell a story and inspire some kind of cinematic imagery when you hear them, and that is definitely true of 'Ghost Story.' It creates a mood and a vibe that is different than anything else I've recorded before."

The song is written in the key of G major and a 6/8 time signature. It has an approximate tempo of 48 beats per minute and a vocal range of E_{3} to D_{5}. The song's main chord pattern on the verses is C^{M7}–A^{sus2}–Em–D. According to Billboard, Underwood samples the opening lines from Henry Wadsworth Longfellow's poem "Haunted House" at the start of the song.

== Critical reception ==
The Nash News gave a positive review of the song, writing, "One of Underwood's strengths has been the storytelling within her songs...["Ghost Story"] is ethereal in style and vulnerable in message and it brings a new sound to the current radio climate. Rolling Stone also offered a positive review—praising its "slowed down, waltzing rhythm" and "eerie atmosphere", noting its departure from another of Underwood's breakup hits, "Before He Cheats". Taste of Country praised Underwood's vocal performance, saying, "[she] belts emotively on the chorus, displaying her unbridled desire to hold her old flame captive" and calling the song "vividly-painted".

== Promotion ==
Underwood performed the song live for the first time at the 64th Grammy Awards, held in Las Vegas, on April 3, 2022. The official lyric video was released at her YouTube on March 18, 2022. She performed the song live for the 2022 CMT Music Awards on April 11, wearing a purple asymmetric jumpsuit and bare feet—being carried into the air on a ribbon toward the end of the performance. She included "Ghost Story" as part of her set at Stagecoach Festival, along with "Denim and Rhinestones" and "Crazy Angels". She performed it again at CMA Music Fest in June 2022. When Apple Music debuted its Sessions EP feature in July, Underwood was the first artist featured; she performed three songs, including "Ghost Story" and "Blown Away." She included it for the setlist during an iHeart concert special, which aired September 29.

== Commercial performance ==
"Ghost Story" marks Underwood's thirtieth top ten on the US Country Airplay; it also reached number 61 on the US Billboard Hot 100. In Canada, the song peaked top ten on the Canada Country chart.

== Music video ==
The video for the song premiered on April 29, 2022. The music video was filmed in the Los Angeles Theatre and was directed by Randee St. Nicholas. Underwood said of Nicholas, "I am very visually-oriented and from the first time I heard 'Ghost Story,' I had a vision for how I wanted to bring this song to life in performance and Randee always takes everything to a whole other artistic level beyond my own imagination." The male lead in the video is Craig Geoghan. An alternate version of the video premiered in July.

== Charts ==
=== Weekly charts ===
Weekly chart performance
Chart (2022)	Peak position
Australia Digital Tracks (ARIA)	31
Canada Hot 100 (Billboard)	84
Canada Country (Billboard)	9
UK Singles Downloads (OCC)	76
UK Singles Sales (OCC)	78
US Billboard Hot 100	61
US Hot Country Songs (Billboard)	12
US Country Airplay (Billboard)	6

=== Year-end charts ===
Year-end chart performance
Chart (2022)	Position
US Hot Country Songs (Billboard)	41
US Country Airplay (Billboard)	37

== Certifications ==
Certifications and sales
Region	Certification	Certified units/sales
United States (RIAA)	Gold	500,000^{‡}
^{‡} Sales+streaming figures based on certification alone.
