= My Gift =

Studio album by Carrie Underwood
- Released: September 25, 2020
- Genre: Christmas; country
- Length: 41:16
- Label: Capitol Nashville
- Producer: Greg Wells

Carrie Underwood chronology
| Cry Pretty (2018) | My Gift (2020) | My Savior (2021) |

Singles from My Gift
- 1. "Hallelujah" Released: November 13, 2020

My Gift is the seventh studio album and first Christmas album by American singer Carrie Underwood. It was released on September 25, 2020, through Capitol Records Nashville. Produced by Greg Wells, My Gift features guest appearances from John Legend on "Hallelujah" and Underwood's elder son Isaiah on "The Little Drummer Boy".

== Background and release ==
Since Underwood had been wanting to make a full-length Christmas album for a long time, she decided it would be her next musical project after promoting her previous album, Cry Pretty (2018). Produced and arranged by Greg Wells, My Gift features eight traditional tracks and three originals, two of those co-written by Underwood. One of the traditional tracks, "The Little Drummer Boy", Underwood was going to record alone but kept thinking about her oldest son Isaiah and asked him if he would want to sing with her on it, which he said "yes". John Legend is featured on "Hallelujah" which he co-wrote with Toby Gad. The two recorded it separately via emails and Zoom. David Garcia, who co-produced Cry Pretty, co-wrote the songs "Sweet Baby Jesus" and "Let There Be Peace" with Underwood and Brett James.

During an interview with Today's Country with Kelleigh Bannen, Underwood stated that the song came in late into the album process, and she knew she had to make room for it. It was also her idea to make the song a duet. In September, Underwood told MusicRow that she reviewed numerous recordings while refining her vision for the album, using them as reference points to communicate her expectations to producer Greg Wells. She cited Céline Dion's rendition of "O Holy Night" as an example of a "beautiful and big and classic" interpretation, while noting that she initially struggled to connect with existing versions of "Joyful, Joyful, We Adore Thee", which she felt were often "march-y". According to Underwood, Wells proposed an a cappella approach for the latter, a choice she described as "unique" and emotionally satisfying, ultimately leading to its placement as the album's opening track.

== Promotion ==
Underwood first announced the album in June 2020. The tracklist was announced on August 27. Underwood appeared on the Today Show on September 24, to promote the album. In November, Underwood released a bonus track to the album, "Favorite Time of Year", in partnership with Amazon Music. It reached number one on the Billboard Hot Christian Songs chart, becoming Underwood's second number one hit on that chart and also reached number 62 on the Billboard Hot 100 chart. As cross-promotion for the album, Underwood starred in and executive produced an original HBO Max holiday special, airing on December 3, entitled My Gift: A Christmas Special from Carrie Underwood.

The official music video for "Hallelujah" was released on November 19. Underwood appeared in a Ring commercial, as cross-promotion for her song "Favorite Time of Year." On November 26, Underwood and Josh Groban were the featured artists for iHeartRadio's Holiday special. Underwood performed "Mary, Did You Know?", "Have Yourself a Merry Little Christmas", and "O Holy Night." On December 3, Underwood performed "O Holy Night" on The Tonight Show Starring Jimmy Fallon. On December 8, Underwood performed songs from the album for a Pandora Live event, hosted by Storme Warren. On December 18, Underwood performed "Mary, Did You Know?" on The Kelly Clarkson Show. On December 17, she performed "Have Yourself a Merry Little Christmas" on Late Night with Seth Meyers.

A special edition of the album was released on September 24, 2021. It contains three new tracks, including "Favorite Time of Year", which was previously an Amazon Music exclusive. In November 2021, the My Gift Christmas special returned to stream on HBO MAX. In November 2021, Underwood performed "Mary, Did You Know" during ABC's CMA Country Christmas special. Underwood performed "Favorite Time of Year" during NBC's Macy's Thanksgiving Day Parade. On December 1, 2021, Underwood performed two songs – "Let There Be Peace" and "Have Yourself a Merry Little Christmas" – for the Rockefeller Center Christmas Tree Lighting. On December 18, the Grand Ole Opry, in partnership with the USO, aired a holiday special for the military, including a performance by Underwood. She performed "Silent Night" for Opry Live: USO Holiday Special.

=== Singles ===
On August 28, 2020, the promotional track "Let There Be Peace" was released to YouTube ahead of the album. The song peaked at number 21 on the Billboard Hot Christian Songs chart. "Hallelujah" was sent to Adult Contemporary radio on November 13, 2020, and it debuted at number 28 on Billboard's Adult Contemporary chart for the week ending November 20. The song peaked at number one on the Hot Christian Songs chart, number three on both Adult Contemporary chart and Hot Country Songs chart and at number 54 on the Billboard Hot 100.

== Critical reception ==
Professional ratings
Review scores
| Source | Rating |
|---|---|
| AllMusic | 3/5 stars |
| The Arts Desk | 2/5 stars |
| Knoxville News Sentinel | 4/5 |
| The Observer | 3.5/5 |
| Vinyl Chapters | 4/5 |

Stephen Thomas Erlewine of AllMusic rated My Gift 3 stars out 5. He called the album a "stately, somber affair" partly due to the production from Greg Wells, writing that the album "proceeds at a steady pace, adorned with very few bells and whistles, and a sparse choice that helps highlight how Underwood chooses to sing primarily religious-themed material." Tom Cramer of The Eastern Echo gave a positive review, writing that it "will bring the listener the gift of contemplation: to contemplate what the true meaning of Christmas is, what's really necessary to celebrate Christmas during a pandemic, and to contemplate what is going on in the world today", also praising the duet with John Legend, saying it "would be spectacular if they ever get to perform this song together." Emily Simpson of Vinyl Chapters gave a positive review, calling the duet between Underwood and Legend a stand-out track, and writing, "In a decidedly non-traditional year, Carrie Underwood has kept one musical tradition going with this album. My Gift offers us moments of joy and unity, a little dose of Christmas cheer that everyone needs to hear."

Chuck Campbell of Knoxville News Sentinel gave a positive review of the album, awarding it 4 out of 5, calling it "reverential, poignant and heavily religious – calming music suitable for reflection and introspection", but was less favorable toward the duets with John Legend and Underwood's son, calling the former "disjointed and ultimately overcooked" and speculating that the latter will "sound adorable to many, but cloying to others." The Observer gave a positive review of the album, awarding it 3.5 out of 5, but highlighted the promotional single, "Let There Be Peace," calling it "the most soulful" of the album. Katie Columbus of The Arts Desk gave it 2 out of 5 stars, writing, "Listened to in full, My Gift is cloying and repetitive. Whilst reflective and meaningful for some, for others it'll be sorely lacking in festive fun."

== Accolades ==
The album received two nominations and one win at the 2021 Billboard Music Awards.

| Year | Organization | Award | Result | Ref. |
|---|---|---|---|---|
| 2021 | Billboard Music Awards | Top Christian Album | Won | |
| 2021 | Billboard Music Awards | Top Country Album | Nominated | |

== Commercial performance ==
In the United States, My Gift sold 41,000 copies in its first week and debuted at No. 8 on the Billboard 200 and number one on the Top Country Albums respectively. The album also debuted at number one on the Billboard Holiday Albums and Top Christian Albums charts, Underwood's first album to do so. The achievement made Underwood the first artist to place eight consecutive number one albums on the Top Country Albums chart, according to Billboard. It reached a new peak of number five on the Billboard 200 after moving 53,000 units on the week ending December 19, 2020. The album experienced its best sales on the week ending December 24, when it sold 57,000 copies. My Gift spent a seventh nonconsecutive week atop the tally on Billboard's Top Holiday Albums chart as it re-entered on issue dated October 9, 2021, after six weeks at number one last season following its release on Sept. 25, 2020. The album was reissued on Sept. 24, 2021 with three bonus tracks.

Two of the album's tracks, "Favorite Time of Year" and "Hallelujah", topped the Billboard Hot Christian Songs chart. My Gift was certified Gold by the RIAA on November 5, 2021. As of December 2022, the album has sold 628,000 albums.

=== Other charted songs ===
All the tracks from My Gift, including the Amazon Music exclusive "Favorite Time of Year", appeared on the Billboard Hot Christian Songs chart. "Favorite Time of Year" spent two weeks at number one before being replaced by "Hallelujah", making Underwood the first female artist and only the second artist to replace themselves at the top spot in the chart's 17-year history. Additionally with "Silent Night" at number three, Underwood became the first artist to command the top three positions of the chart for multiple weeks (four consecutive weeks). Three of the songs from the album appeared on the Billboard Hot 100 chart, led by "Hallelujah" at number 54, "Favorite Time of Year" at number 62 and "Silent Night" at number 94. The first two songs also peaked high on the Hot Country Songs chart, at numbers three and five respectively, for the week ending January 2, 2021.

== Track listing ==
My Gift – standard edition
| No. | Title | Writer(s) | Length |
|---|---|---|---|
| 1. | "Joyful, Joyful We Adore Thee" | Henry van Dyke Jr.; Ludwig van Beethoven | 3:55 |
| 2. | "O Come, All Ye Faithful (Adeste Fideles)" | John Francis Wade; Frederick Oakeley | 3:14 |
| 3. | "Let There Be Peace" | Carrie Underwood; Brett James; David Garcia | 3:59 |
| 4. | "The Little Drummer Boy" (featuring Isaiah Fisher) | Harry Simeone; Katherine Kennicott Davis; Henry Onorati | 2:56 |
| 5. | "Sweet Baby Jesus" | Underwood; James; Garcia | 4:29 |
| 6. | "Hallelujah" (featuring John Legend) | John Stephens; Toby Gad; Leonard Cohen | 4:35 |
| 7. | "O Holy Night" | Adolphe Adam; John Sullivan Dwight | 4:41 |
| 8. | "Mary, Did You Know?" | Mark Lowry; Buddy Greene | 3:26 |
| 9. | "Have Yourself a Merry Little Christmas" | Ralph Blane; Hugh Martin | 3:49 |
| 10. | "Away in a Manger" | James Ramsey Murray; Martin Luther | 2:41 |
| 11. | "Silent Night" | Franz Xaver Gruber; Joseph Mohr | 3:31 |
| Total length: | | | 41:16 |

My Gift – Amazon Music edition
| No. | Title | Writer(s) | Length |
|---|---|---|---|
| 12. | "Favorite Time of Year" | Underwood; Hillary Lindsey; Chris DeStefano | 3:17 |
| Total length: | | | 44:33 |

My Gift – special edition
| No. | Title | Writer(s) | Length |
|---|---|---|---|
| 13. | "All Is Well" | Wayne Kirkpatrick; Michael W. Smith | 3:50 |
| 14. | "Let There Be Peace" / "Something in the Water" (live from My Gift: A Christmas Special) | Underwood; James; Garcia; DeStefano | 8:39 |
| Total length: | | | 57:02 |

== Personnel ==
Vocals

- Isaiah Fisher – featured vocals (track 4)
- Brett James – background vocals
- John Legend – featured vocals (track 6)
- Carrie Underwood – lead vocals
- Nina Woodford – background vocals

Musicians

- Steven Becknell – French horn
- David Campbell – arranger
- Heather Clark – flute
- Andrew Duckles – viola
- Donald Foster – clarinet
- David Garcia – acoustic guitar
- Steven Holtman – contrabass trombone
- David Kalmusky – electric guitar
- Rong Huey Liu – oboe
- Mac McAnally – acoustic guitar
- Carolyn Riley – viola
- David Stone – bass
- David Washburn – trumpet
- Greg Wells – acoustic guitar, arranger, bass, drums, electric guitar, percussion

Production

- Serban Ghenea – mastering
- Joseph Lianes – photography
- Randy Merrill – mixing
- Greg Wells – producer, engineer, programming

== Charts ==
=== Weekly charts ===
| Chart (2020–2021) | Peak position |
|---|---|
| Australian Albums (ARIA) | 98 |
| Canadian Albums (Billboard) | 28 |
| Scottish Albums (OCC) | 58 |
| UK Album Downloads (OCC) | 37 |
| UK Albums Sales (OCC) | 57 |
| UK Country Albums (OCC) | 1 |
| US Billboard 200 | 5 |
| US Top Christian Albums (Billboard) | 1 |
| US Top Country Albums (Billboard) | 1 |
| US Top Holiday Albums (Billboard) | 1 |

=== Year-end charts ===
| Chart (2020) | Position |
|---|---|
| US Top Album Sales (Billboard) | 65 |
| US Top Christian Albums (Billboard) | 15 |
| US Top Country Albums (Billboard) | 59 |
| Chart (2021) | Position |
| US Billboard 200 | 155 |
| US Top Album Sales (Billboard) | 26 |
| US Top Christian Albums (Billboard) | 2 |
| US Top Country Albums (Billboard) | 25 |
| Chart (2022) | Position |
| US Top Album Sales (Billboard) | 69 |
| US Top Christian Albums (Billboard) | 4 |
| US Top Country Albums (Billboard) | 47 |
| Chart (2023) | Position |
| US Top Christian Albums (Billboard) | 35 |
| US Top Country Albums (Billboard) | 73 |

== Certifications ==
| Region | Certification | Certified units/sales |
|---|---|---|
| United States (RIAA) | Gold | 500,000^{‡} |
^{‡} Sales+streaming figures based on certification alone.

== Release history ==
| Region | Date | Edition(s) | Format | Label | Ref. |
|---|---|---|---|---|---|
| Various | September 25, 2020 | Standard | CD; digital download; streaming | Capitol Nashville | |
| Various | October 30, 2020 | Standard | Vinyl | Capitol Nashville | |
| Various | September 24, 2021 | Deluxe | CD; digital download; streaming | Capitol Nashville | |
