= David Garcia (musician) =

Music producer and songwriter

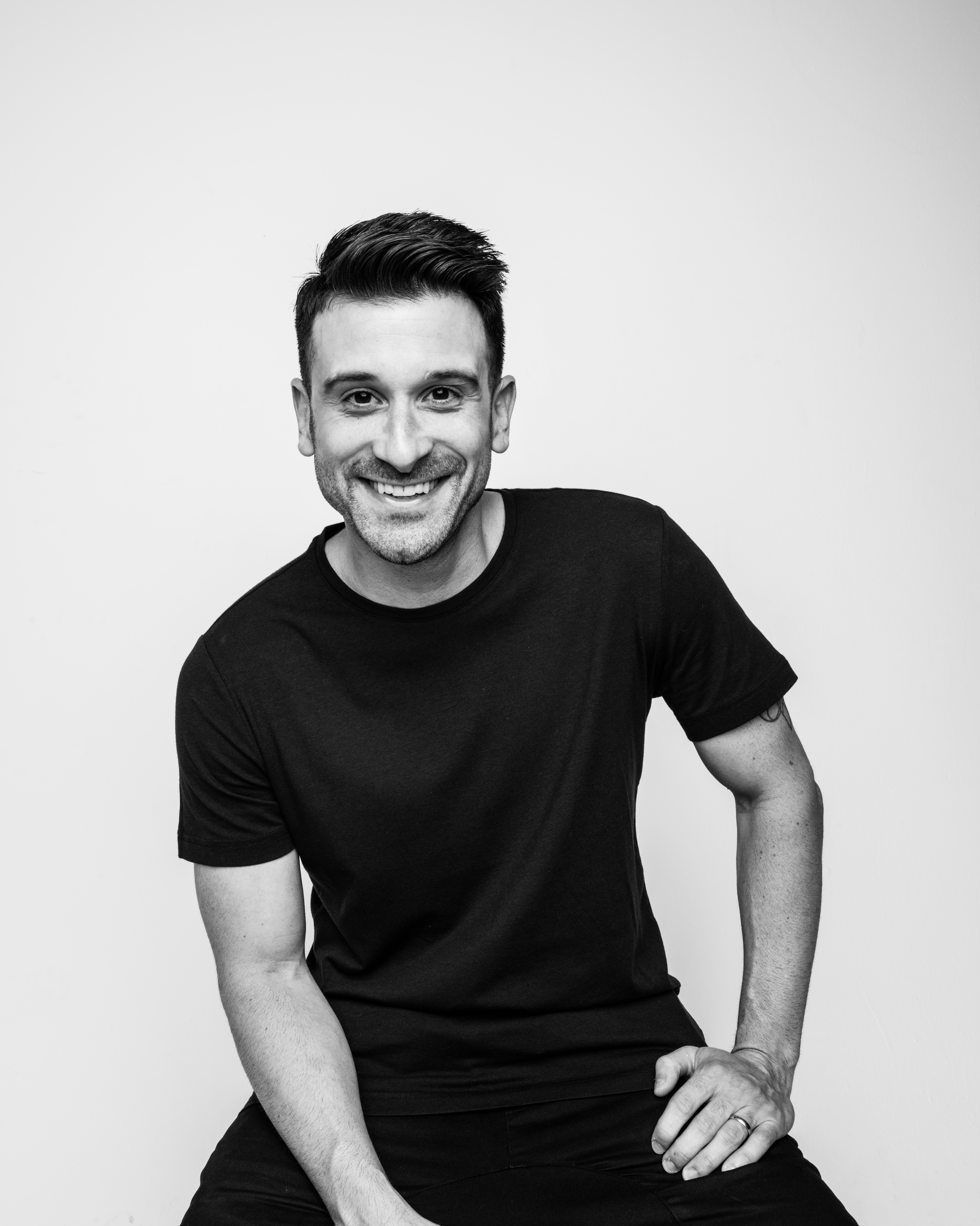
- David Garcia in 2015

Background information
- Birth name: David Arthur Garcia
- Born: January 18, 1983 (age 42); Long Island, New York
- Origin: Nashville, Tennessee
- Genres: Pop; country
- Occupations: Record producer; composer; songwriter; music editor; programmer; lyricist; keytarist; music engineer; music mixer; music arranger; guitarist; bassist; keyboardist; organist; pianist; drummer; singer
- Instruments: Bass; drums; guitar; keys; keytar; mandolin; piano; vocals
- Years active: 2008–present
- Website: davidgarciaofficial.com

David Arthur Garcia (born January 18, 1983) is an American record producer and songwriter. He has received four Grammy Awards, and has won nine GMA Dove Awards, for his songwriting and record production. He was honored with the ASCAP Christian songwriter on the year award, in 2015. He co-wrote and produced the smash hit single "Meant to Be" with Bebe Rexha featuring Florida Georgia Line, and co-produced "Let You Down" by NF.

== Early and personal life ==
David Arthur Garcia was born in 1983, in Long Island, New York to a Puerto Rican family. He is married to Krystal Garcia (née, Ogden).

== Music career ==
His music production songwriting career commenced around 2008, where he gained GMA Dove Awards for his music production in 2011 for Outta Space Love, 2013 for Eye on It, and 2014 for Overcomer, while obtaining an award for composing in 2013 for A Messenger. Garcia was awarded two Grammy Award at the 56th Annual Grammy Awards, in the categories of Best Contemporary Christian Music Song, in recognition of his songwriting, and Best Contemporary Christian Music Album, in recognition of his production. In 2015, he was recognized as the Christian co-songwriter of the year by American Society of Composers, Authors and Publishers.

In 2017 he earned his first No. 1 song at country radio for Kip Moore's song "More Girls Like You". Along with co-writing it, he also co-produced it with Kip He co-wrote and co-produced the smash hit "Meant to Be" on Bebe Rexha's Latest EP featuring Florida Georgia Line. Garcia started working with Carrie Underwood to produce her sixth studio album, ‘’Cry Pretty’’. He also co-produced the hit song "Let You Down", from NF's album Perception.October 6, 2017. in 2019, Garcia co-produced Avenue Beat's self-titled debut EP. In 2020, he worked again with Carrie Underwood, co-writing the song "Sweet Baby Jesus" for the album My Gift, which he again co-produced with Underwood, as well as co-producing her first Gospel cover album, My Savior. During 2022, Garcia worked with Underwood for her upcoming ninth studio album, Denim & Rhinestones, co-producing the entire album, and co-writing all but one track on the album, scheduled for release on June 10, 2022.
