= List of awards and nominations received by Carrie Underwood =

Carrie Underwood awards and nominations
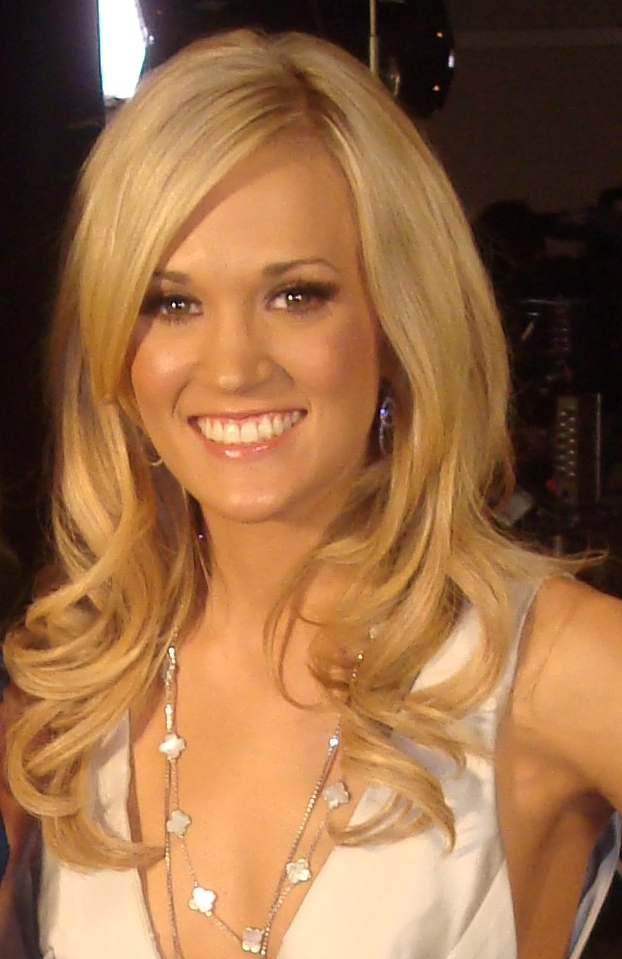
- Underwood at the 2010 ACM Awards
Awards and nominations
Award	Wins	Nominations
American Music Awards	17	23
Billboard	12	24
Grammy	8	16
Academy of Country Music Awards	16	36
Country Music Association Awards	9	21
People's Choice Awards	10	20
CMT Music Awards	25	36
BMI Awards	29	0
GMA Dove Awards	2	3
American Country Awards	12	18
Golden Globe Awards	0	1

Totals (Note: Certain award groups do not simply award one winner. They acknowledge several different recipients, have runners-up, and have third place. Since this is a specific recognition and is different from losing an award, runner-up mentions are considered wins in this award tally. For simplification and to avoid errors, each award in this list has been presumed to have had a prior nomination.)
- Wins: 187
- Nominations: 319

American country singer Carrie Underwood has received many awards and nominations for her work across music, film, television and fashion. She has released nine studio albums and one greatest hits collection — Some Hearts, Carnival Ride, Play On, Blown Away, Greatest Hits: Decade Number 1, Storyteller, Cry Pretty, My Gift, My Savior, and Denim & Rhinestones.

Among over 180 worldwide awards, Underwood has won eight Grammy Awards and became, in 2007, only the second country artist in history to win the Grammy Award for Best New Artist.

== Academy of Country Music Awards ==
The Academy of Country Music Awards is an annual country music awards show, the first ever created, established in 1964. In 2010, Underwood made history by becoming the first woman to ever receive the Entertainer of the Year Award twice, in addition to being the first to ever win the award consecutively. She broke her own record in September 2020, becoming the first and only woman in history to win the award three times. In 2014, she won the Gene Weed Special Achievement Award, for her widespread exposure through National Football League NBC Sunday Night Football, the NBC broadcast of The Sound of Music Live!, her Blown Away Tour and her charity work with the American Red Cross and her C.A.T.S. Foundation. She is also the first person to win the ACM Lifting Lives Gary Haber Award, which recognizes a country music artist or industry professional "who is committed to serving others, has a generosity of spirit and shows a dedication to helping those in need". Underwood is one of the most awarded women in the history of the ACM Awards. She has won a total of 16 ACM Awards.

Year	Nominated work / Recipient	Category	Result	Ref.
2006	"Jesus, Take the Wheel"	Single Record of the Year	Won	
2006	Carrie Underwood	Top New Female Vocalist of the Year	Won	
2006	Carrie Underwood	Female Vocalist of the Year	Nominated	
2007	Carrie Underwood	Female Vocalist of the Year	Won	
2007	Some Hearts	Album of the Year	Won	
2007	"Before He Cheats"	Music Video of the Year	Won	
2007	"Before He Cheats"	Single Record of the Year	Nominated	
2008	Carrie Underwood	Female Vocalist of the Year	Won	
2009	Carrie Underwood	Entertainer of the Year	Won	
2009	Carrie Underwood	Female Vocalist of the Year	Won	
2009	Carnival Ride	Album of the Year	Nominated	
2009	"Just A Dream"	Music Video of the Year	Nominated	
2010	Carrie Underwood	Triple Crown Award	Won	
2010	Carrie Underwood	Entertainer of the Year	Won	
2010	Carrie Underwood	Female Vocalist of the Year	Nominated	
2010	"Cowboy Casanova"	Song of the Year	Nominated	
2010	Play On	Album of the Year	Nominated	
2010	"I Told You So" (feat. Randy Travis)	Vocal Event of the Year	Nominated	
2011	Carrie Underwood	Female Vocalist of the Year	Nominated	
2012	Carrie Underwood	Female Vocalist of the Year	Nominated	
2012	"Remind Me"	Vocal Event of the Year	Nominated	
2013	Carrie Underwood	Female Vocalist of the Year	Nominated	
2013	Blown Away	Album of the Year	Nominated	
2014	Carrie Underwood	Female Vocalist of the Year	Nominated	
2014	Carrie Underwood	Gene Weed Special Achievement Award	Won	
2014	"Two Black Cadillacs"	Video of the Year	Nominated	
2015	"Somethin' Bad" (with Miranda Lambert)	Video of the Year	Nominated	
2015	"Somethin' Bad" (with Miranda Lambert)	Vocal Event of the Year	Nominated	
2015	Carrie Underwood	Female Vocalist of the Year	Nominated	
2016	Carrie Underwood	Female Vocalist of the Year	Nominated	
2016	Carrie Underwood	ACM Lifting Lives Gary Haber Award	Won	
2017	Carrie Underwood	Entertainer of the Year	Nominated	
2017	Carrie Underwood	Female Vocalist of the Year	Nominated	
2017	"Forever Country"	Video of the Year	Won	
2018	Carrie Underwood	Female Vocalist of the Year	Nominated	
2018	"The Fighter" (with Keith Urban)	Vocal Event of the Year	Won	
2019	Carrie Underwood	Female Artist of the Year	Nominated	
2020	Carrie Underwood	Entertainer of the Year	Won	
2020	Carrie Underwood	Female Artist of the Year	Nominated	
2021	"Hallelujah"(with John Legend)	Video of the Year	Nominated	
2022	Carrie Underwood	Entertainer of the Year	Nominated	
2022	"If I Didn't Love You"(with Jason Aldean)	Single of the Year	Won	
2022	"If I Didn't Love You"(with Jason Aldean)	Video of the Year	Nominated	
2022	"If I Didn't Love You"(with Jason Aldean)	Musical Event of the Year	Nominated	
2023	Carrie Underwood	Entertainer of the Year	Nominated	

== American Country Awards ==
The American Country Awards was a country music awards show, entirely voted on by fans. Created by the Fox Network, the awards honored country music artists in music, video, and touring categories. It lasted four years. Underwood won twelve awards, more than any other artist.

Year	Nominated work / Recipient	Category	Result	Ref.
2010	Carrie Underwood	Artist of the Year	Won	
2010	Carrie Underwood	Female Artist of the Year	Won	
2010	Carrie Underwood	Touring Artist of the Year (Play On Tour)	Won	
2010	"Cowboy Casanova"	Female Single of the Year	Won	
2010	"Cowboy Casanova"	Female Music Video of the Year	Won	
2010	Play On	Album of the Year	Won	
2011	Carrie Underwood	Female Artist of the Year	Won	
2011	Carrie Underwood	Touring Artist of the Year (Play On Tour)	Nominated	
2011	"Mama's Song"	Female Single of the Year	Won	
2011	"Mama's Song"	Female Music Video of the Year	Won	
2012	Carrie Underwood	Female Artist of the Year	Won	
2012	"Good Girl"	Female Single of the Year	Nominated	
2012	"Good Girl"	Female Music Video of the Year	Nominated	
2012	"Remind Me"	Vocal Collaboration of the Year (with Brad Paisley)	Won	
2013	Carrie Underwood	Female Artist of the Year	Nominated	
2013	Carrie Underwood	Touring Artist of the Year (Blown Away Tour)	Nominated	
2013	"Two Black Cadillacs"	Female Single of the Year	Nominated	
2013	"Blown Away"	Female Music Video of the Year	Won	

== American Country Countdown Awards ==
The American Country Countdown Awards is an annual country music awards show that honors artists based on their album sales, touring data and the amount of their radio airplay. It is named after the long-running radio show American Country Countdown.

Year	Nominated work / Recipient	Category	Result	Ref.
2014	Carrie Underwood	Female Vocalist of the Year	Nominated	
2016	Storyteller	Album of the Year	Nominated	
2016	Carrie Underwood	Female Vocalist of the Year	Won	

== American Music Awards ==
The American Music Awards is an annual major American music award show by the American Broadcasting Company, presented since 1973. Underwood has won seventeen awards out of twenty-three nominations. She is the only artist in AMA history to have won Favorite Country Album for every studio album released.

Year	Nominated work / Recipient	Category	Result	Ref.
2006	Carrie Underwood	Favorite Breakthrough Artist	Won	
2007	Carrie Underwood	Artist of the Year	Won	
2007	Carrie Underwood	Favorite Female Country Artist	Won	
2007	Some Hearts	Favorite Country Album	Won	
2008	Carrie Underwood	Favorite Female Country Artist	Nominated	
2008	Carnival Ride	Favorite Country Album	Won	
2009	Carrie Underwood	Favorite Female Country Artist	Nominated	
2010	Carrie Underwood	Favorite Female Country Artist	Nominated	
2010	Play On	Favorite Country Album	Won	
2012	Blown Away	Favorite Country Album	Won	
2012	Carrie Underwood	Favorite Female Country Artist	Nominated	
2013	Carrie Underwood	Favorite Female Country Artist	Nominated	
2014	Carrie Underwood	Favorite Female Country Artist	Won	
2015	Carrie Underwood	Favorite Female Country Artist	Won	
2016	Carrie Underwood	Favorite Female Country Artist	Won	
2016	Carrie Underwood	Artist of the Year	Nominated	
2016	Storyteller	Favorite Country Album	Won	
2017	Carrie Underwood	Favorite Female Country Artist	Won	
2018	Carrie Underwood	Favorite Female Country Artist	Won	
2019	Carrie Underwood	Favorite Female Country Artist	Won	
2019	Cry Pretty	Favorite Country Album	Won	
2021	Carrie Underwood	Favorite Artist - Contemporary Inspirational	Won	
2021	Carrie Underwood	Favorite Female Country Artist	Won	
2022	Carrie Underwood	Favorite Female Country Artist	Nominated	
2022	Denim & Rhinestones	Favorite Country Album	Nominated	

== Billboard Music Awards ==
The Billboard Music Awards is an honor given by Billboard, the preeminent publication covering the music business. Finalists are based on United States year-end chart performance according to Nielsen data for sales, number of downloads and total airplay. Underwood has won 12 Billboard Music Awards out of 24 nominations.

Year	Nominated work / Recipient	Category	Result	Ref.
2005	"Inside Your Heaven"	Top-Selling Hot 100 Song of the Year	Won	
2005	"Inside Your Heaven"	Top-Selling Country Single of the Year	Won	
2005	"Inside Your Heaven"	Country Single Sales Artist of the Year	Won	
2006	Carrie Underwood	Female Billboard 200 Album Artist of the Year	Won	
2006	Carrie Underwood	Country New Artist of the Year	Won	
2006	Carrie Underwood	Female Country Artist of the Year	Won	
2006	Some Hearts	Album of the Year	Won	
2006	Some Hearts	Country Album of the Year	Won	
2013	Carrie Underwood	Top Country Artist	Nominated	
2013	Blown Away	Top Country Album	Nominated	
2014	Carrie Underwood	Milestone Award	Won	
2015	"Something in the Water"	Top Christian Song	Won	
2016	Carrie Underwood	Top Country Artist	Nominated	
2016	Storyteller	Top Country Album	Nominated	
2019	Carrie Underwood	Top Female Country Artist	Won	
2019	Cry Pretty	Top Country Album	Nominated	
2021	Carrie Underwood	Top Female Country Artist	Nominated	
2021	Carrie Underwood	Top Christian Artist	Nominated	
2021	My Gift	Top Country Album	Nominated	
2021	My Gift	Top Christian Album	Won	
2022	Carrie Underwood	Top Female Country Artist	Nominated	
2022	Carrie Underwood	Top Christian Artist	Nominated	
2022	My Savior	Top Christian Album	Nominated	
2022	"If I Didn't Love You"	Top Country Song	Nominated	

== BMI Awards ==
The Broadcast Music, Incorporated (BMI) Awards is an annual award show hosted for the purpose of giving awards to songwriters. Songwriters are selected each year from the entire BMI catalog, based on the number of performances during the award period. Underwood has been honored with 14 BMI Country awards for songwriting. She has also won 14 BMI Million-Air Awards, which are acknowledgements of songs that have achieved one million or more spins on radio. Additionally, at the 69th annual BMI/NAB Dinner in 2017, Underwood received the BMI Board of Directors Award, for the impact her music has had on the broadcast industry, as well as her many contributions as a songwriter.

=== BMI Country Awards ===
Year	Nominated work / Recipient	Category	Result	Ref.
2008	"So Small"	Songwriting award	Won	
2008	"All-American Girl"	Songwriting award	Won	
2009	"Last Name"	Songwriting award	Won	
2010	"Cowboy Casanova"	Songwriting award	Won	
2011	"Temporary Home"	Songwriting award	Won	
2011	"Undo It"	Songwriting award	Won	
2011	"Mama's Song"	Songwriting award	Won	
2013	"Good Girl"	Songwriting award	Won	
2013	"Two Black Cadillacs	Songwriting award	Won	
2014	"See You Again"	Songwriting award	Won	
2015	"Something in the Water"	Songwriting award	Won	
2016	"Little Toy Guns"	Songwriting award	Won	
2016	"Smoke Break"	Songwriting award	Won	
2016	"Heartbeat"	Songwriting award	Won	
2019	"Cry Pretty"	Songwriting award	Won	

=== BMI Million-Air Awards ===
Year	Nominated work / Recipient	Category	Result	Ref.
2013	"All-American Girl"	"Million-Air" certificate	Won	
2013	"Mama's Song"	"Million-Air" certificate	Won	
2013	"Good Girl"	"Million-Air" certificate	Won	
2017	"So Small"	"Million-Air" certificate	Won	
2017	"Temporary Home"	"Million-Air" certificate	Won	
2017	"Cowboy Casanova"	"Million-Air" certificate	Won	
2017	"Last Name"	"Million-Air" certificate	Won	
2017	"Undo It"	"Million-Air" certificate	Won	
2017	"Heartbeat"	"Million-Air" certificate	Won	
2017	"Little Toy Guns"	"Million-Air" certificate	Won	
2017	"See You Again"	"Million-Air" certificate	Won	
2017	"Smoke Break"	"Million-Air" certificate	Won	
2017	"Something in the Water"	"Million-Air" certificate	Won	

=== BMI/NAB Dinner ===
Year	Nominated work / Recipient	Category	Result	Ref.
2017	Carrie Underwood	BMI Board of Directors Award	Won	

== British Country Music Awards ==
The British Country Music Awards (BCM Awards) are held annually by the British Country Music Association to honor national and international success for country music artists familiar to the United Kingdom. Underwood has won once.

Year	Nominated work / Recipient	Category	Result	Ref.
2013	Carrie Underwood	International Act of the Year	Nominated	
2013	Blown Away	International Album of the Year	Won	
2016	Storyteller	International Album of the Year	Nominated	
2016	"Smoke Break"	International Song of the Year	Nominated	

== Celebrity Fight Night ==
Celebrity Fight Night Foundation, Inc. is a non-profit organization that was established to promote ongoing efforts to eliminate sickness and poverty. It annually holds the Muhammad Ali's "Celebrity Fight Night" charity event. The Foundation also established the "Muhammad Ali Celebrity Fight Night Award", which acknowledges leaders in the sports, entertainment and business communities who best represent the qualities associated with the Alis' fight to find a cure for Parkinson's disease. Underwood received the award in 2016.

Year	Nominated work / Recipient	Category	Result	Ref.
2016	Carrie Underwood	Muhammad Ali Celebrity Fight Night Award	Won	

== Clio Awards ==
The Clio Awards is an annual award program that recognizes innovation and creative excellence in advertising, design and communication, as judged by an international panel of advertising professionals. It has been held since 1960.

Year	Nominated work / Recipient	Category	Result	Ref.
2016	CALIA by Carrie Underwood - Stay The Path	Shortlist for Best Print	Won	

== Country Music Association Awards ==
The Country Music Association Awards is an annual country music awards show, established in 1967. Underwood has won nine awards, including both the Chairman's Award and International Artist Achievement award, which recognizes outstanding achievement by a U.S.-based artist who contributes to the awareness and development of country music worldwide. Underwoood has won nine awards out of forty-two nominations.

Year	Nominated work / Recipient	Category	Result	Ref.
2006	Carrie Underwood	Female Vocalist of the Year	Won	
2006	Carrie Underwood	Horizon Award	Won	
2006	"Jesus, Take the Wheel"	Single Record of the Year	Nominated	
2006	"Jesus, Take the Wheel"	Music Video of the Year	Nominated	
2007	"Before He Cheats"	Music Video of the Year	Nominated	
2007	"Before He Cheats"	Single of the Year	Won	
2007	Carrie Underwood	Female Vocalist of the Year	Won	
2008	Carrie Underwood	Female Vocalist of the Year	Won	
2008	Carnival Ride	Album of the Year	Nominated	
2009	"I Told You So" (feat. Randy Travis)	Musical Event of the Year	Nominated	
2009	Carrie Underwood	Female Vocalist of the Year	Nominated	
2010	Carrie Underwood	Female Vocalist of the Year	Nominated	
2010	Play On	Album of the Year	Nominated	
2011	Carrie Underwood	Female Vocalist of the Year	Nominated	
2012	Carrie Underwood	Female Vocalist of the Year	Nominated	
2013	Carrie Underwood	Female Vocalist of the Year	Nominated	
2013	Blown Away	Album of the Year	Nominated	
2013	"Blown Away"	Music Video of the Year	Nominated	
2014	"Somethin' Bad" (with Miranda Lambert)	Musical Event of the Year	Nominated	
2014	"Somethin' Bad" (with Miranda Lambert)	Music Video of the Year	Nominated	
2014	Carrie Underwood	Female Vocalist of the Year	Nominated	
2015	Carrie Underwood	Female Vocalist of the Year	Nominated	
2015	"Something in the Water"	Music Video of the Year	Nominated	
2016	Carrie Underwood	Chairman's Award	Won	
2016	Carrie Underwood	Entertainer of the Year	Nominated	
2016	Carrie Underwood	Female Vocalist of the Year	Won	
2016	Storyteller	Album of the Year	Nominated	
2016	"The Fighter" (with Keith Urban)	Musical Event of the Year	Nominated	
2017	Carrie Underwood	Female Vocalist of the Year	Nominated	
2017	Carrie Underwood	International Artist Achievement Award	Won	
2018	Carrie Underwood	Female Vocalist of the Year	Won	
2018	"Cry Pretty"	Music Video of the Year	Nominated	
2019	Carrie Underwood	Female Vocalist of the Year	Nominated	
2019	Carrie Underwood	Entertainer of the Year	Nominated	
2019	Cry Pretty	Album of the Year	Nominated	
2020	Carrie Underwood	Entertainer of the Year	Nominated	
2020	Carrie Underwood	Female Vocalist of the Year	Nominated	
2021	Carrie Underwood	Entertainer of the Year	Nominated	
2022	Carrie Underwood	Entertainer of the Year	Nominated	
2022	Carrie Underwood	Female Vocalist of the Year	Nominated	
2022	"If I Didn’t Love You" (with Jason Aldean)	Musical Event of the Year	Nominated	
2023	Carrie Underwood	Entertainer of the Year	Nominated	

== Country Music Awards of Australia ==
The Country Music Awards of Australia are held by the Country Music Association of Australia to celebrate recording excellence in the Australian country music industry. They were originally established in 1973. Underwood has won once.

Year	Nominated work / Recipient	Category	Result	Ref.
2013	Blown Away	Top Selling International Album of the Year	Won	

== CMC Music Awards ==
Year	Nominated work / Recipient	Category	Result	Ref.
2014	Carrie Underwood	International Artist of the Year	Nominated	
2018	The Fighter (ft. Keith Urban)	International Video of the Year	Won	

== CMT Awards ==
=== CMT Artists of the Year Awards ===
The CMT Artists of the Year Awards are given by Country Music Television to honor the top country acts of each year. The show was established in 2010. Underwood has been awarded five times.

Year	Nominated work / Recipient	Category	Result	Ref.
2010	Carrie Underwood	Honoree	Won	
2012	Carrie Underwood	Honoree	Won	
2016	Carrie Underwood	Honoree	Won	
2018	Carrie Underwood	Honoree	Won	
2019	Carrie Underwood	Honoree	Won	

=== CMT Music Awards ===
The CMT Music Awards is an annual ceremony dedicated exclusively to honor country music videos. It was established in 1967, and had several names throughout the years. In 2002, it was moved to Country Music Television and, in 2005, was renamed CMT Music Awards. With 25 wins, Underwood is the most awarded artist overall in the show's history. She also has the most Video of the Year wins and Female Video of the Year wins.

Year	Nominated work / Recipient	Category	Result	Ref.
2006	"Jesus, Take the Wheel"	Female Video of the Year	Won	
2006	"Jesus, Take the Wheel"	Breakthrough Video of the Year	Won	
2006	"Jesus, Take the Wheel"	Inspirational Video of the Year	Nominated	
2007	"Before He Cheats"	Video of the Year	Won	
2007	"Before He Cheats"	Female Video of the Year	Won	
2008	"So Small"	Female Video of the Year	Nominated	
2009	"Just a Dream"	Video of the Year	Nominated	
2010	"Cowboy Casanova"	Video of the Year	Won	
2010	"Cowboy Casanova"	Female Video of the Year	Nominated	
2010	"Temporary Home" (from CMT: Invitation Only feat. Carrie Underwood)	CMT Performance of the Year	Won	
2011	"Undo It"	Video of the Year	Nominated	
2011	"Undo It"	Female Video of the Year	Nominated	
2012	"Remind Me" (with Brad Paisley)	Collaborative Video of the Year	Won	
2012	"Remind Me" (with Brad Paisley)	Video of the Year	Nominated	
2012	"Good Girl"	Video of the Year	Won	
2012	"Good Girl"	Female Video of the Year	Nominated	
2012	"Just a Dream"/"Dream On" (with Steven Tyler, from CMT Crossroads)	CMT Performance of the Year	Nominated	
2013	"Blown Away"	Video of the Year	Won	
2013	"Two Black Cadillacs"	Female Video of the Year	Nominated	
2014	"See You Again"	Video of the Year	Won	
2014	"See You Again"	Female Video of the Year	Nominated	
2015	"Something in the Water"	Female Video of the Year	Won	
2015	"Something in the Water"	Video of the Year	Won	
2015	"Somethin' Bad" (with Miranda Lambert)	Video of the Year	Nominated	
2015	"Somethin' Bad" (with Miranda Lambert)	Collaborative Video of the Year	Won	
2015	"Little Toy Guns"	Female Video of the Year	Nominated	
2016	"Smoke Break"			
2016	"Smoke Break"	Video of the Year	Nominated	
2016	"Smoke Break"	Female Video of the Year	Won	
2016	"Smoke Break"	CMT Performance of the Year	Won	
2017	"Church Bells"	Video of the Year	Nominated	
2017	"Church Bells"	Female Video of the Year	Won	
2017	"The Fighter"(with Keith Urban)	Collaborative Video of the Year	Won	
2018	"The Champion" (with Ludacris)	Video of the Year	Nominated	
2018	"The Champion" (with Ludacris)	Female Video of the Year	Won	
2018	"The Champion" (with Ludacris)	Collaborative Video of the Year	Nominated	
2018	"The Fighter" (with Keith Urban from the 2017 CMT Music Awards)	CMT Performance of the Year	Nominated	
2019	"Love Wins"	Female Video of the Year	Won	
2019	"Cry Pretty"	Video of the Year	Won	
2020	"Drinking Alone"	Female Video of the Year	Won	
2020	"Drinking Alone"	Video of the Year	Won	
2021	"Hallelujah" (with John Legend)	Video of the Year	Won	
2021	"Hallelujah" (with John Legend)	Collaborative Video of the Year	Nominated	
2022	"If I Didn't Love You" (with Jason Aldean)	Collaborative Video of the Year	Won	
2022	"If I Didn't Love You" (with Jason Aldean)	Video of the Year	Won	
2023	"Ghost Story"	Female Video of the Year	Nominated	
2023	"Hate My Heart"	Video of the Year	Nominated	

=== CMT Online Awards ===
CMT Online Awards were an annual online award show, established in 2006 by Country Music Television. This was a "fan-voted" award show, based on the fans going to CMT.com streaming the videos and viewing the artists' pages. The winner in each category received the highest numbers of streams and views on CMT.com.

Year	Nominated work / Recipient	Category	Result	Ref.
2008	Carrie Underwood	Most Digitally-Active Female Artist	Won	
2008	"All-American Girl"	Most Streamed Country Song of the Year	Won	

=== CMT Teddy Awards ===
The CMT Teddy Awards were a special music video award show dedicated to celebrate Valentine's Day. There were eight categories. Underwood won two awards.

Year	Nominated work / Recipient	Category	Result	Ref.
2012	"Before He Cheats"	Best Cheating Video	Won	
2012	"Cowboy Casanova"	Best Use of Lingerie in a Video	Won	

== Country Radio Seminar ==
The Country Radio Seminar (CRS) is one of the largest media gatherings of any kind or of any format in the US founded in 1970 and is held annually by the Country Radio Broadcasters. The seminar also honors individuals related to country music with different awards. In 2014, the CRS' board of directors awarded Underwood the Artist Humanitarian Award, which was created in 1990 to honor those country music artists who have exhibited exceptional humanitarian efforts during their career.

Year	Nominated work / Recipient	Category	Result	Ref.
2014	Carrie Underwood	Artist Humanitarian Award	Won	

== European Country Music Association Awards ==
The European Country Music Association (ECMA) was established in 1994 in the United Kingdom and Spain, Europe, by people related to the European Country music scene, such as publishers, DJs and musics. It originally consisted of less than 100 members and the very first president was UK's Harry E. Fenton. Votes for nominations and winners come only from members of the organization. Underwood won once.

Year	Nominated work / Recipient	Category	Result	Ref.
2008	Carrie Underwood	Female Vocalist of the Year	Won	

== French Country Music Association Awards ==
The French Country Music Association Awards is an annual country music award show presented by the French Association of Country Music since 2004.

Year	Nominated work / Recipient	Category	Result	Ref.
2010	Carrie Underwood	Female Vocalist of the Year	Won	
2010	"Cowboy Casanova"	Music Video of the Year	Won	

== Golden Globe Awards ==
The Golden Globe Awards were established in 1944 by the Hollywood Foreign Press Association to celebrate the best in film and television.

Year	Nominated work / Recipient	Category	Result	Ref.
2011	"There's a Place For Us" (The Chronicles of Narnia: The Voyage of the Dawn Treader)	Best Original Song	Nominated	

== GMA Dove Awards ==
A Dove Award is an accolade by the Gospel Music Association (GMA) of the United States to recognize outstanding achievement in the Christian music industry. The awards are presented, since 1969, at an annual ceremony called the GMA Dove Awards. Underwood has won two awards out of three nominations.

Year	Nominated work	Category	Result	Ref.
2006	"Jesus, Take the Wheel"	Country Recorded Song of the Year	Won	
2021	My Savior	Country Album of the Year	Nominated	
2021	"Great Is Thy Faithfulness" (with CeCe Winans)	Inspirational Recorded Song of the Year	Won	
2025	"If It Was Up to Me"(with Ben Fuller)	Bluegrass/Country/Roots Recorded Song of the Year	Pending	

== Grammy Awards ==
The Grammy Awards are presented annually by the National Academy of Recording Arts and Sciences for outstanding achievements in the music industry. Presented since 1958, Underwood has won eight awards, from 16 nominations. In 2007, she became only the second country artist in history to win the Best New Artist award, following LeAnn Rimes (1997).

Year	Nominated work / recipient	Category	Result	Ref.
2007	Carrie Underwood	Best New Artist	Won	
2007	"Jesus, Take the Wheel"	Best Female Country Vocal Performance	Won	
2008	"Before He Cheats"	Best Female Country Vocal Performance	Won	
2008	"Oh Love" (with Brad Paisley)	Best Country Collaboration with Vocals	Nominated	
2009	"Last Name"	Best Female Country Vocal Performance	Won	
2010	"Just a Dream"	Best Female Country Vocal Performance	Nominated	
2010	"I Told You So" (feat. Randy Travis)	Best Country Collaboration with Vocals	Won	
2011	"Temporary Home"	Best Female Country Vocal Performance	Nominated	
2012	"Mama's Song"	Best Country Solo Performance	Nominated	
2013	"Blown Away"	Best Country Solo Performance	Won	
2015	"Something in the Water"	Best Country Solo Performance	Won	
2015	"Somethin' Bad" (with Miranda Lambert)	Best Country Duo/Group Performance	Nominated	
2016	"Little Toy Guns"	Best Country Solo Performance	Nominated	
2017	"Church Bells"	Best Country Solo Performance	Nominated	
2022	My Savior	Best Roots Gospel Album	Won	
2022	"If I Didn't Love You" (with Jason Aldean)	Best Country Duo/Group Performance	Nominated	

== Honors Gala ==
The Honors Gala is an event organized since 1975 by the T.J. Martell Foundation, the music industry's largest foundation that funds innovative medical research focused on finding cures for leukemia, cancer and AIDS. It honors individuals of several areas with different awards. At the 38th event, in 2013, Underwood received the Artist Achievement Award.

Year	Nominated work / Recipient	Category	Result	Ref.
2013	Carrie Underwood	Artist Achievement Award	Won	

== iHeartRadio Music Awards ==
The iHeartRadio Music Awards is an international music awards show founded by IHeartRadio in 2014. She has won one award out of nine nominations.

Year	Nominated work / Recipient	Category	Result	Ref.
2016	Carrie Underwood	Female Artist of the Year	Nominated	
2017	Carrie Underwood	Country Artist of the Year	Nominated	
2017	"Church Bells"	Country Song of the Year	Nominated	
2019	Carrie Underwood	Country Artist of the Year	Nominated	
2022	"If I Didn't Love You" (with Jason Aldean)	Country Song of the Year	Won	
2022	"If I Didn't Love You" (with Jason Aldean)	Best Collaboration	Nominated	
2023	Carrie Underwood	Country Artist of the Year	Nominated	
2023	Carrie Underwood	Favorite Tour Style	Nominated	
2023	Favorite Residency	Reflection: The Las Vegas Residency	Nominated	

== Inspirational Country Music Awards ==
The Inspirational Country Music Awards are a member-voted award show dedicated to honoring and showcasing the biggest names and emerging talent among artists who perform Christian and inspirational country music.

Year	Nominated work / Recipient	Category	Result	Ref.
2006	Carrie Underwood	Mainstream Country Artist	Won	
2010	"Temporary Home"	Inspirational Video of the Year	Won	
2015	Carrie Underwood	Mainstream Country Female Artist	Won	
2015	"Something in the Water"	Mainstream Inspirational Song of the Year	Won	
2015	"Something in the Water"	Inspirational Video of the Year	Won	

== Music Row Awards ==
The MusicRow Awards is an annual awards show held by Nashville's music industry publication, MusicRow. The winners are selected by over 300 managers, musicians, songwriters, publishers and label executives. Underwood was awarded once.

Year	Nominated work / Recipient	Category	Result	Ref.
2006	Carrie Underwood	Critic's Pick	Won	
2013	"Blown Away"	Song of the Year	Nominated	
2015	"Something in the Water"	Song of the Year	Nominated	

== MTV Movie & TV Awards ==
The MTV Movie & TV Awards is a film and television awards shows presented annually on MTV. Originally the MTV Movie Awards it was rebranded as the MTV Movie & TV Awards in 2017, to also honor work in television. Underwood has one nomination.

Year	Recipient	Category	Result	Ref.
2022	Best Musical Moment	"The Moment of Truth" from Cobra Kai	Nominated	

== MTV Video Music Awards ==
The MTV Video Music Awards are an annual fan-voted award show started in 1984. This list does not include her seven CMT Music Awards for Video of the Year, which have since been designated as the MTV Video Music Award for Best Country in 2025.

Year	Recipient	Category	Result	Ref.
2007	Carrie Underwood	Best New Artist	Nominated	
2025	"I'm Gonna Love You"	Best Country	Nominated	

== Napster Awards ==
The Napster Awards honor artists and songs played most by subscribers.

Year	Recipient	Category	Result	Ref.
2006	Carrie Underwood	Most Domestically-Played New Artist	Won	

== Nashville Songwriters Association International Awards ==
The Nashville Songwriters Association International (NSAI) hosts industry professionals each year for the "World's Largest #1 Party", in association with the Recording Academy, to celebrate veteran hitmakers and talented new artists.

Year	Recipient	Category	Result	Ref.
2010	"Cowboy Casanova"	Top Tunesmith	Won	
2010	"Temporary Home"	Top Tunesmith	Won	

== Nashville Symphony's Harmony ==
The Nashville Symphony's Harmony award is presented to individuals who have demonstrated continued interest and support of music in Nashville, exemplify the connections between the diverse music of the city and have contributed to the development and appreciation of music culture. It is presented during the annual Symphony Ball on Saturday at the Schermerhorn Symphony Center in downtown Nashville.

Year	Recipient	Category	Result	Ref.
2009	Carrie Underwood	Nashville Symphony's Harmony Award	Won	

== People's Choice Awards ==
The People's Choice Awards is an American awards show recognizing the people and the work of popular culture. The show has been held annually since 1975 and is a venue for the general public to honor their favorite actors and actresses, musical performers, television shows and motion pictures. Underwood has won ten awards, out of twenty-two nominations.

Year	Nominated work / Recipient	Category	Result	Ref.
2007	Carrie Underwood	Favorite Female Artist	Won	
2007	"Before He Cheats"	Favorite Country Song	Won	
2009	"Last Name"	Favorite Country Song	Won	
2009	Carrie Underwood	Favorite Female Artist	Won	
2009	Carrie Underwood	Favorite Star Under 35	Won	
2010	Carrie Underwood	Favorite Female Artist	Nominated	
2010	Carrie Underwood	Favorite Country Artist	Won	
2011	Carrie Underwood	Favorite Country Artist	Nominated	
2011	Carrie Underwood	Favorite TV Guest Star (How I Met Your Mother)	Nominated	
2011	Carrie Underwood	Favorite Female Artist	Nominated	
2013	Carrie Underwood	Favorite Female Artist	Nominated	
2013	Carrie Underwood	Favorite Country Artist	Nominated	
2013	Blown Away	Favorite Album	Nominated	
2014	Carrie Underwood	Favorite Female Country Artist	Nominated	
2015	Carrie Underwood	Favorite Female Country Artist	Won	
2016	Carrie Underwood	Favorite Female Country Artist	Won	
2017	Carrie Underwood	Favorite Female Country Artist	Won	
2018	Carrie Underwood	Country Artist of the Year	Nominated	
2019	Carrie Underwood	Country Artist of the Year	Nominated	
2021	Carrie Underwood	Country Artist of the Year	Nominated	
2022	Carrie Underwood	Country Artist of the Year	Won	
2024	Carrie Underwood	The Female Country Artist of the Year	Nominated	

== Pollstar Awards ==
The Pollstar Awards is ceremony to honor artists and professionals in the concert industry. It was created by Pollstar, the leading trade publication for the concert tour industry.

Year	Recipient	Category	Result	Ref.
2010	Play On Tour	Most Creative Stage Production	Nominated	
2017	The Storyteller Tour: Stories in the Round	Most Creative Stage Production	Nominated	

== Radio Disney Music Awards ==
The Radio Disney Music Awards honor most popular and played artists for the previous years. The Hero Award is an honor for contribution for the charitable work.

Year	Recipient	Category	Result	Ref.
2018	Carrie Underwood	The Hero Award	Won	

== Teen Choice Awards ==
The Teen Choice Awards is an annual show that honors the years biggest achievements in music, movies, sports, television, fashion and more. Underwood has won seven awards out of nineteen nominations.

Year	Recipient	Category	Result	Ref.
2005	Carrie Underwood	Choice Female TV Reality/Variety Star	Won	
2006	Carrie Underwood	Choice Breakout Female Artist	Nominated	
2006	Carrie Underwood	Choice Female Artist	Nominated	
2007	Carrie Underwood	Choice Female Artist	Nominated	
2007	"Before He Cheats"	Choice Payback Track	Nominated	
2008	Carrie Underwood	Choice Female Red Carpet Fashion Icon	Won	
2009	Carnival Ride	Choice Female Album	Nominated	
2010	Carrie Underwood	Choice Female Country Artist	Nominated	
2010	Carrie Underwood	Choice American Idol Alum	Nominated	
2010	Play On	Choice Country Album	Nominated	
2010	"Undo It"	Choice Country Song	Nominated	
2011	Carrie Underwood	Choice Female Country Artist	Nominated	
2012	Carrie Underwood	Choice Female Country Artist	Nominated	
2013	Carrie Underwood	Choice Female Country Artist	Nominated	
2014	Carrie Underwood	Choice Female Country Artist	Nominated	
2014	"Somethin' Bad" (with Miranda Lambert)	Choice Country Song	Nominated	
2015	Carrie Underwood	Choice Country Artist	Won	
2015	"Little Toy Guns"	Choice Country Song	Won	
2016	Carrie Underwood	Choice Country Artist	Won	
2016	"Church Bells"	Choice Country Song	Nominated	
2017	Carrie Underwood	Choice Country Artist	Won	
2017	"The Fighter" (with Keith Urban)	Choice Country Song	Nominated	
2018	Carrie Underwood	Choice Country Artist	Won	
2018	"Cry Pretty"	Choice Country Song	Nominated	

== Other honors ==
=== Grand Ole Opry ===
The Grand Ole Opry is the longest running radio broadcast in American history. Being made a member of the Grand Ole Opry, Country Music's big house, is to be identified as a member of the elite of Country Music. Underwood was inducted in 2008.

Year	Recipient	Category	Result	Ref.
2008	Carrie Underwood	Member Induction	Won	

=== Guinness World Records ===
The Guinness World Records is a reference book published annually, listing world records and national records, both of human achievements and the extremes of the natural world. Underwood currently holds seven records.

Year	Nominated work / Recipient	Record	Result	Ref.
2005	Carrie Underwood (alongside Bo Bice)	Same song in the top 3	Won	
2006	Carrie Underwood	Longest stay at No1 on US country chart in a calendar year by a solo artist (female)	Won	
2007	Carrie Underwood	Best-selling album by an Idol winner	Won	
2007	Carrie Underwood	Slowest climbing act on the US Hot 100	Won	
2007	Carrie Underwood	Longest stay on US Hot 100 singles chart in the 21st century	Won	
2008	Carrie Underwood	Best start on the US country chart by a female artist	Won	
2010	Carrie Underwood (alongside Reba McEntire)	Most country no.1s for a female artist in the US	Won	

=== Hollywood Walk of Fame ===
The Hollywood Walk of Fame is a sidewalk along Hollywood Boulevard and Vine Street in Hollywood, California, United States, that serves as an entertainment hall of fame. It is embedded with more than 2,000 five-pointed stars featuring the names of celebrities honored by the Hollywood Chamber of Commerce for their contributions to the entertainment industry. Underwood is part of the Class of 2018 of inductees.

Year	Recipient	Category	Result	Ref.
2018	Carrie Underwood	Hollywood Walk of Fame Star	Won	

=== Oklahoma Hall of Fame ===
The Oklahoma Memorial Association was founded in 1927 with the purpose of establishing the Oklahoma Hall of Fame. Being inducted into the Oklahoma Hall of Fame is considered to be the highest honor one can receive from the state. Underwood was inducted in 2017.

Year	Recipient	Category	Result	Ref.
2017	Carrie Underwood	Hall of Fame induction	Won	

=== Oklahoma Music Hall of Fame ===
The Oklahoma Music Hall of Fame honors Oklahoma musicians for their lifetime achievements in music. The induction ceremony and concert is held each year in Muskogee. Underwood was inducted in 2009. She had previously been named the Hall's Rising Star in 2005.

Year	Recipient	Category	Result	Ref.
2005	Carrie Underwood	Rising Star of the Year	Won	
2009	Carrie Underwood	Hall of Fame Induction	Won	
