= Play On Tour =

2010–2011 concert tour by Carrie Underwood

- Tour by Carrie Underwood
- Promotional poster for the tour
- Associated album: Play On
- Start date: March 11, 2010
- End date: January 2, 2011
- Legs: 2
- No. of shows: 109 in North America

Carrie Underwood concert chronology
- Carnival Ride Tour (2008); Play On Tour (2010–2011); Blown Away Tour (2012–2013)

The Play On Tour was the third headlining tour by American country music singer Carrie Underwood, in support of her third studio album Play On. The first legs which contains dates only in North America, were announced on December 10, 2009. The second leg was announced on April 16, 2010. Tickets went on sale on April 24, 2010.

Underwood announced that 36 cents from each ticket sale would be donated to the Save the Children program, inspired by a line in her song "Change" from the Play On album.

In July 2010, Pollstar.com revealed the Top 100 tours of the first half of the year for North American statistics. The "Play On Tour" clocked in at number fifteen, bringing in a total of $18.4 million. It brought in a collective total of more than 375,000 tickets in its first four months. In December 2010, Pollstar.com revealed the Top 50 tours of 2010 for both North American and worldwide statistics. The "Play On Tour" clocked in at number nineteen on the North American ranking, and number thirty-one worldwide.

In December 2010, Billboard ranked the Play On Tour at number twenty-four for all tours of 2010. On January 4, 2011, official statistics revealed that Underwood played to over one million fans throughout the tour, becoming her largest tour to date.

== Opening acts ==
- Sons of Sylvia March 11, 2010 – January 1, 2011
- Lady Antebellum March 11, 2010- June 20, 2010
- Craig Morgan Spring leg
- Billy Currington Fall Leg

== Setlist ==
1. "Cowboy Casanova"
2. "Quitter"
3. "Wasted"
4. "I Know You Won't"
5. "Some Hearts"
6. "Just a Dream"
7. "Temporary Home"
8. "There's a Place for Us" (only in some concerts)
9. "Someday When I Stop Loving You"
10. "All-American Girl"
11. "So Small"
12. "Take Me Home, Country Roads"
13. "This Time"
14. "Undo It"
15. "Jesus, Take the Wheel"/"How Great Thou Art"
16. "What Can I Say?" (with Sons of Sylvia)
17. "Change"
18. "I Told You So" (with Randy Travis; virtual duet)
19. "Mama's Song"
20. "Last Name"

Encore: "Play On Video Segue"

1. "Before He Cheats"
2. "Songs Like This" (excerpts from "White Liar" and "Single Ladies (Put a Ring On It)")

=== Fan club member's choice ===
From March 11 to April 14, Underwood covered a song from one of four genres (Rock, '90's Country, '80's, and Classic Country) based on how fans voted. The winner for each city was revealed and performed during that night's show of the Play On Tour.

1. Reading, Pennsylvania on March 11, 2010 – "Summer Of '69" – Rock
2. Albany, New York on March 12, 2010 – "Home Sweet Home" – Rock
3. Providence, Rhode Island on March 13, 2010 – "Chasin' That Neon Rainbow" (duet with Craig Morgan) – 90's Country
4. Portland, Maine on March 15, 2010 – "9 to 5" – 80's
5. Bridgeport, Connecticut on March 16, 2010 – "9 to 5" – 80's
6. Atlantic City, New Jersey on March 19, 2010 – "Summer Of '69" – Rock
7. Mashantucket, Connecticut on March 20, 2010 - "Stand By Your Man" - Classic Country
8. Worcester, Massachusetts on March 21, 2010 – "Home Sweet Home" – Rock
9. Hamilton, Ontario on March 23, 2010 - "Stand By Your Man" - Classic Country
10. Ottawa, Ontario on March 24, 2010 – "Summer Of '69" – Rock
11. Trenton, New Jersey on March 26, 2010 – "Sweet Child o' Mine" – Rock
12. Amherst, Massachusetts on March 27, 2010 – "Summer Of '69" – Rock
13. Wilkes-Barre, Pennsylvania on March 29, 2010 - "Stand By Your Man"- Classic Country
14. Rochester, New York on March 31, 2010 – "9 to 5" – 80's
15. Pittsburgh, Pennsylvania on April 1, 2010 – "Livin' on the Edge" – Rock
16. Pikeville, Kentucky on April 3, 2010 – "Don't Rock the Jukebox" (duet with Craig Morgan) – 90's Country
17. Columbus, Ohio on April 6, 2010 – "Don't Rock the Jukebox" (duet with Craig Morgan) – 90's Country
18. Peoria, Illinois on April 7, 2010 – "Summer Of '69" – Rock
19. Indianapolis, Indiana on April 9, 2010 – "Home Sweet Home"- Rock
20. Rockford, Illinois on April 10, 2010 – "Don't Rock the Jukebox" (duet with Craig Morgan) – 90's Country
21. Ft Wayne, Indiana on April 12, 2010 – "9 to 5" – 80's
22. Saginaw, Michigan on April 13, 2010 – "Summer Of '69" – Rock
23. East Lansing, Michigan on April 14, 2010 – "Paradise City" – Rock

== Tour dates ==
Date	City	Country	Venue
North America Leg 1
March 11, 2010	Reading	United States	Sovereign Center
March 12, 2010	Albany	United States	Times Union Center
March 13, 2010	Providence	United States	Dunkin' Donuts Center
March 15, 2010	Portland	United States	Cumberland County Civic Center
March 16, 2010	Bridgeport	United States	Arena at Harbor Yard
March 19, 2010	Atlantic City	United States	Boardwalk Hall
March 20, 2010	Ledyard	United States	MGM Grand Theater
March 21, 2010	Worcester	United States	DCU Center
March 23, 2010	Hamilton	Canada	Copps Coliseum
March 24, 2010	Ottawa	Canada	Scotiabank Place
March 26, 2010	Trenton	United States	Sun National Bank Center
March 27, 2010	Amherst	United States	Mullins Center
March 29, 2010	Wilkes-Barre	United States	Wachovia Arena
March 31, 2010	Rochester	United States	Blue Cross Arena
April 1, 2010	Pittsburgh	United States	Petersen Events Center
April 3, 2010	Pikeville	United States	Eastern Kentucky Expo Center
April 6, 2010	Columbus	United States	Schottenstein Center
April 7, 2010	Peoria	United States	Carver Arena
April 9, 2010	Indianapolis	United States	Conseco Fieldhouse
April 10, 2010	Rockford	United States	Rockford MetroCentre
April 12, 2010	Fort Wayne	United States	Allen County War Memorial Coliseum
April 13, 2010	Saginaw	United States	Dow Event Center
April 14, 2010	East Lansing	United States	Breslin Student Events Center
April 23, 2010	Grand Rapids	United States	Van Andel Arena
April 24, 2010	Toledo	United States	Lucas County Arena
April 25, 2010	Cincinnati	United States	U.S. Bank Arena
April 27, 2010	Richmond	United States	Richmond Coliseum
April 28, 2010	Charleston	United States	Charleston Civic Center
April 30, 2010	Fayetteville	United States	Crown Coliseum
May 1, 2010	Columbia	United States	Colonial Life Arena
May 2, 2010	Augusta	United States	James Brown Arena
May 4, 2010	Tallahassee	United States	Tallahassee-Leon County Civic Center
May 5, 2010	Pensacola	United States	Pensacola Civic Center
May 7, 2010	New Orleans	United States	Lakefront Arena
May 8, 2010	Lafayette	United States	Cajundome
May 10, 2010	Beaumont	United States	Ford Arena
May 12, 2010	Austin	United States	Frank Erwin Center
May 13, 2010	Corpus Christi	United States	American Bank Center Arena
May 15, 2010	Tucson	United States	Tucson Arena
May 18, 2010	Fresno	United States	Save Mart Center
May 20, 2010	Sacramento	United States	ARCO Arena
May 21, 2010	Reno	United States	Reno Events Center
May 22, 2010	Las Vegas	United States	Orleans Arena
May 29, 2010	Everett	United States	Comcast Arena at Everett
May 30, 2010	Spokane	United States	Spokane Arena
June 1, 2010	Nampa	United States	Idaho Center Arena
June 3, 2010	Broomfield	United States	Odeum Colorado
June 4, 2010	Colorado Springs	United States	Colorado Springs World Arena
June 12, 2010	Birmingham	United States	BJCC Arena
June 13, 2010	Lexington	United States	Rupp Arena
June 15, 2010	Springfield	United States	JQH Arena
June 17, 2010	Fargo	United States	Fargodome
June 18, 2010	Winnipeg	Canada	MTS Centre
June 20, 2010	Saskatoon	Canada	Credit Union Centre
North America Leg 2
September 25, 2010	Portland	United States	Rose Garden Arena
September 27, 2010	San Jose	United States	HP Pavilion at San Jose
September 28, 2010	Stockton	United States	Stockton Arena
September 29, 2010	Bakersfield	United States	Rabobank Arena
October 1, 2010	San Diego	United States	San Diego Sports Arena
October 2, 2010	Los Angeles	United States	Hollywood Bowl
October 3, 2010	Glendale	United States	Jobing.com Arena
October 6, 2010	Houston	United States	Toyota Center
October 7, 2010	San Antonio	United States	AT&T Center
October 9, 2010	Dallas	United States	American Airlines Center
October 10, 2010	Tulsa	United States	BOK Center
October 12, 2010	North Little Rock	United States	Verizon Arena
October 13, 2010	Nashville	United States	Bridgestone Arena
October 15, 2010	Moline	United States	iWireless Center
October 16, 2010	Kansas City	United States	Sprint Center
October 17, 2010	Omaha	United States	Qwest Center
October 19, 2010	Wichita	United States	Intrust Bank Arena
October 20, 2010	Oklahoma City	United States	Ford Center
October 22, 2010	Memphis	United States	FedExForum
October 23, 2010	Mobile	United States	Mobile Civic Center
October 25, 2010	Tampa	United States	St. Pete Times Forum
October 26, 2010	Jacksonville	United States	Jacksonville Veterans Memorial Arena
October 27, 2010	Duluth	United States	Arena at Gwinnett Center
October 29, 2010	Greensboro	United States	Greensboro Coliseum
October 30, 2010	Charlotte	United States	Time Warner Cable Arena
November 1, 2010	Cleveland	United States	Wolstein Center
November 3, 2010	Toronto	Canada	Air Canada Centre
November 5, 2010	Uniondale	United States	Nassau Veterans Memorial Coliseum
November 6, 2010	Manchester	United States	Verizon Wireless Arena
November 12, 2010	Roanoke	United States	Roanoke Civic Center
November 13, 2010	University Park	United States	Bryce Jordan Center
November 15, 2010	Newark	United States	Prudential Center
November 16, 2010	Baltimore	United States	1st Mariner Arena
December 1, 2010	St. Louis	United States	Chaifetz Arena
December 2, 2010	Evansville	United States	Roberts Stadium
December 4, 2010	Des Moines	United States	Wells Fargo Arena
December 5, 2010	Sioux Falls	United States	Sioux Falls Arena
December 7, 2010	Rapid City	United States	Summit Arena
December 8, 2010	Casper	United States	Casper Events Center
December 10, 2010	Bismarck	United States	Bismarck Civic Center[B], [C]
December 12, 2010	Bozeman	United States	Worthington Arena
December 14, 2010	Yakima	United States	Yakima SunDome
December 15, 2010	Penticton	Canada	South Okanagan Events Centre[C]
December 16, 2010	Vancouver	Canada	Rogers Arena
December 18, 2010	Edmonton	Canada	Rexall Place
December 19, 2010	Calgary	Canada	Scotiabank Saddledome
December 22, 2010	Auburn Hills	United States	The Palace of Auburn Hills[E]
December 30, 2010	Ledyard	United States	MGM Grand Theater
January 2, 2011	Atlantic City	United States	Borgata Events Center

- A This show was co-headlined with Brad Paisley.
- B This show was originally scheduled to be held in Billings, but due to tornado damage at the selected venue, the show was cancelled, and later changed to Bismarck.

=== Festivals & Events ===
Date	City	Country	Venue
June 10, 2010	Nashville	United States	LP Field – CMA Music Festival
July 3, 2010	Provo	United States	Stadium of Fire
July 4, 2010	Milwaukee	United States	Marcus Amphitheater – Summerfest
July 31, 2010	Fairlea	United States	Greenbrier Classic [A]
August 29, 2010	Highland Park	United States	Ravinia Festival
August 31, 2010	Saint Paul	United States	Minnesota State Fair

== Box office score data ==
Date	Venue	City	Tickets sold / available	Gross revenue
March 11, 2010	Sovereign Center	Reading	6,489 / 6,489 (100%)	$321,375
March 12, 2010	Times Union Center	Albany	8,316 / 8,316 (100%)	$393,200
March 13, 2010	Dunkin' Donuts Center	Providence	8,075 / 8,075 (100%)	$389,495
March 15, 2010	Cumberland Country Civic Center	Portland	5,591 / 5,591 (100%)	$275,715
March 16, 2010	Arena at Harbor Yard	Bridgeport	6,724 / 7,284 (92%)	$329,770
March 19, 2010	Boardwalk Hall	Atlantic City	9,854 / 9,926 (99%)	$476,021
March 21, 2010	DCU Center	Worcester	8,178 / 8,178 (100%)	$397,580
March 23, 2010	Copps Coliseum	Hamilton	8,138 / 8,138 (100%)	$439,172
March 24, 2010	Scotiabank Place	Ottawa	8,674 / 9,098 (95%)	$478,270
March 26, 2010	Sun National Bank Center	Trenton	6,831 / 6,831 (100%)	$335,565
March 27, 2010	Mullins Center	Amherst	6,510 / 7,320 (89%)	$328,360
March 29, 2010	Wachovia Arena	Wilkes-Barre	6,694 / 7,130 (94%)	$329,760
March 31, 2010	Blue Cross Arena	Rochester	7,160 / 8,055 (89%)	$355,540
April 1, 2010	Petersen Civic Center	Pittsburgh	7,360 / 7,954 (93%)	$359,210
April 3, 2010	Eastern Kentucky Expo Center	Pikeville	5,668 / 5,668 (100%)	$286,940
April 6, 2010	Schottenstein Center	Columbus	6,516 / 6,516 (100%)	$319,140
April 7, 2010	Carver Arena	Peoria	6,215 / 7,087 (88%)	$311,455
April 9, 2010	Conseco Fieldhouse	Indianapolis	7,796 / 7,796 (100%)	$386,750
April 10, 2010	Rockford MetroCentre	Rockford	6,748 / 6,748 (100%)	$338,340
April 12, 2010	Allen Country War Memorial Coliseum	Fort Wayne	6,239 / 7,391 (84%)	$310,065
April 13, 2010	Dow Event Center	Saginaw	5,252 / 5,252 (100%)	$263,500
April 14, 2010	Breslin Student Events Center	East Lansing	5,537 / 6,342 (87%)	$283,295
April 23, 2010	Van Andel Arena	Grand Rapids	9,193 / 9,193 (100%)	$436,175
April 24, 2010	Lucas County Arena	Toledo	7,268 / 7,268 (100%)	$356,970
April 25, 2010	U.S. Bank Arena	Cincinnati	6,398 / 6,831 (94%)	$317,540
April 27, 2010	Richmond Coliseum	Richmond	6,647 / 7,709 (86%)	$331,685
April 28, 2010	Charleston Civic Center	Charleston	5,527 / 6,010 (92%)	$280,265
April 30, 2010	Crown Coliseum	Fayetteville	7,151 / 7,402 (97%)	$351,145
May 1, 2010	Colonial Life Arena	Columbia	8,131 / 8,463 (96%)	$398,075
May 2, 2010	James Brown Arena	Augusta	6,089 / 6,089 (100%)	$299,755
May 4, 2010	Tallahassee-Leon Country Civic Center	Tallahassee	5,137 / 6,088 (84%)	$264,285
May 5, 2010	Pensacola Civic Center	Pensacola	6,415 / 6,703 (96%)	$321,555
May 7, 2010	Lakefront Arena	New Orleans	5,291 / 5,291 (100%)	$272,175
May 8, 2010	Cajundome	Lafayette	7,561 / 7,897 (96%)	$371,295
May 10, 2010	Ford Arena	Beaumont	5,291 / 5,850 (90%)	$266,740
May 12, 2010	Frank Erwin Center	Austin	6,917 / 6,917 (100%)	$339,315
May 13, 2010	American Bank Center Arena	Corpus Chris	6,658 / 6,843 (97%)	$290,945
May 15, 2010	Tucson Arena	Tucson	6,259 / 6,470 (97%)	$289,760
May 18, 2010	Save Mart Center	Fresno	7,126 / 7,126 (100%)	$347,010
May 20, 2010	ARCO Arena	Sacramento	9,072 / 9,072 (100%)	$437,060
May 21, 2010	Reno Events Center	Reno	6,104 / 6,104 (100%)	$304,390
May 22, 2010	Orleans Arena	Las Vegas	7,671 / 7,671 (100%)	$374,895
May 29, 2010	Comcast Arena at Everett	Everett	7,961 / 7,961 (100%)	$389,955
May 30, 2010	Spokane Arena	Spokane	7,618 / 7,618 (100%)	$369,220
June 1, 2010	Idaho Center Arena	Nampa	6,881 / 6,881 (100%)	$275,825
June 3, 2010	Odeum Colorado	Broomfield	5,642 / 5,642 (100%)	$289,930
June 4, 2010	Colorado Springs World Arena	Colorado Springs	5,858 / 6,075 (96%)	$285,920
June 12, 2010	BJCC Arena	Birmingham	6,740 / 6,963 (97%)	$311,755
June 13, 2010	Rupp Arena	Lexington	8,267 / 8,534 (97%)	$364,055
June 15, 2010	JQH Arena	Springfield	8,499 / 8,499 (100%)	$412,175
June 17, 2010	Fargodome	Fargo	10,394 / 10,394 (100%)	$510,160
June 18, 2010	MTS Centre	Winnipeg	6,418 / 6,660 (96%)	$353,823
June 20, 2010	Credit Union Centre	Saskatoon	7,231 / 7,644 (95%)	$393,142
September 25, 2010	Rose Garden Arena	Portland	7,365 / 7,365 (100%)	$366,658
September 27, 2010	HP Pavilion at San Jose	San Jose	7,818 / 8,161 (96%)	$375,667
September 28, 2010	Stockton Arena	Stockton	8,320 / 8,320 (100%)	$412,260
September 29, 2010	Rabobank Arena	Bakersfield	7,621 / 7,621 (100%)	$329,352
October 1, 2010	San Diego Sports Arena	San Diego	7,412 / 7,603 (97%)	$325,007
October 2, 2010	Hollywood Bowl	Los Angeles	16,583 / 16,848 (98%)	$1,020,188
October 3, 2010	Jobing.com Arena	Glendale	7,974 / 8,170 (98%)	$378,172
October 6, 2010	Toyota Center	Houston	7,968 / 8,436 (94%)	$389,363
October 7, 2010	AT&T Center	San Antonio	6,587 / 6,587 (100%)	$326,554
October 9, 2010	American Airlines Center	Dallas	10,445 / 10,925 (96%)	$495,788
October 10, 2010	BOK Center	Tulsa	11,340 / 11,340 (100%)	$547,870
October 12, 2010	Verizon Arena	North Little Rock	6,827 / 6,827 (100%)	$345,099
October 13, 2010	Bridgestone Arena	Nashville	8,152 / 8,152 (100%)	$411,106
October 15, 2010	iWireless Center	Moline	9,657 / 10,040 (96%)	$462,394
October 16, 2010	Sprint Center	Kansas City	10,649 / 11,105 (96%)	$498,090
October 17, 2010	Qwest Center	Omaha	9,703 / 9,936 (98%)	$471,597
October 19, 2010	Intrust Bank Arena	Wichita	9,091 / 9,091 (100%)	$443,611
October 20, 2010	Ford Center	Oklahoma City	10,118 / 11,028 (92%)	$468,143
October 22, 2010	FedExForum	Memphis	7,501 / 7,501 (100%)	$371,486
October 23, 2010	Mobile Civic Center	Mobile	4,968 / 5,566 (89%)	$251,761
October 25, 2010	St. Pete Times Forum	Tampa	7,454 / 7,454 (100%)	$372,169
October 26, 2010	Jacksonville Veterans Memorial Arena	Jacksonville	10,048 / 10,700 (94%)	$447,976
October 27, 2010	Arena at Gwinnett Center	Duluth	9,613 / 9,613 (100%)	$456,952
October 29, 2010	Greensboro Coliseum	Greensboro	7,427 / 7,611 (98%)	$372,169
October 30, 2010	Time Warner Cable Arena	Charlotte	7,353 / 7,604 (97%)	$365,788
November 1, 2010	Wolstein Center	Cleveland	5,893 / 6,535 (90%)	$299,128
November 3, 2010	Air Canada Centre	Toronto	11,044 / 11,798 (92%)	$554,735
November 5, 2010	Nassau Veterans Memorial Coliseum	Uniondale	9,504 / 9,911 (96%)	$472,042
November 6, 2010	Verizon Wireless Arena	Manchester	8,487 / 8,487 (100%)	$421,039
November 12, 2010	Roanoke Civic Center	Roanoke	7,473 / 7,473 (100%)	$373,662
November 13, 2010	Bryce Jordan Center	University Park	7,611 / 7,611 (100%)	$379,141
November 15, 2010	Prudential Center	Newark	8,137 / 8,635 (94%)	$414,344
November 16, 2010	1st Mariner Arena	Baltimore	8,965 / 9,512 (94%)	$435,678
December 1, 2010	Chaifetz Arena	St. Louis	7,431 / 7,431 (100%)	$375,361
December 2, 2010	Roberts Stadium	Evansville	6,456 / 6,930 (93%)	$323,276
December 4, 2010	Wells Fargo Arena	Des Moines	9,914 / 9,914 (100%)	$483,167
December 5, 2010	Sioux Falls Arena	Sioux Falls	5,757 / 5,757 (100%)	$298,484
December 7, 2010	Summit Arena	Rapid City	6,415 / 6,415 (100%)	$327,003
December 8, 2010	Casper Events Center	Casper	4,758 / 4,904 (97%)	$231,776
December 12, 2010	Worthington Arena	Bozeman	6,153 / 6,831 (90%)	$299,642
December 14, 2010	Yakima SunDome	Yakima	5,508 / 5,905 (93%)	$275,436
December 16, 2010	Rogers Arena	Vancouver	9,808 / 10,493 (93%)	$526,610
December 18, 2010	Rexall Place	Edmonton	9,548 / 10,103 (95%)	$477,588
December 19, 2010	Scotiabank Saddledome	Calgary	11,111 / 11,325 (98%)	$553,117
December 22, 2010	The Palace of Auburn Hills	Auburn Hills	10,553 / 10,553 (100%)	$485,723
TOTAL			750,000 / 775,180 (97%)	$37,127,685

== Awards and nominations ==
Award	Category	Result
1st American Country Awards	Touring Artist of the Year (Carrie Underwood)	Won
22nd Pollstar Awards	Most Creative Stage Production	Nominated

== Tour preparation ==
The tour was reportedly being rehearsed in Mobile, Alabama for two weeks behind locked and tightly sealed doors to keep all hints and clues about the tour completely unknown. Underwood was spotted with stage crew and 6 semi-trucks hauling stage props and pieces to the arena the tour was being rehearsed in. Underwood reportedly paid a near $500,000 for the stage preparation. In interviews, Underwood stated that there will be a lot of "moving parts" on the stage. During the show, she swings from vines, gets transported and lifted across the arena audience while standing in the bed of a large blue pickup truck, has interchangeable backgrounds for the stage backdrop, a lifting stage piece, and does a virtual duet with Randy Travis from what appears to be the stage of the Grand Ole Opry, performing her Grammy-Award-winning collaboration "I Told You So".

== Crew member's death ==
On Saturday, March 20, crew members were carrying Underwood's set pieces from Atlantic City, New Jersey to Mashantucket, Connecticut for her show that day in semi-trucks when a trailer truck driving northbound on the opposite side of the medians began to lose control of the vehicle, causing the trailer truck to slide into the median for approximately 400 feet. Eventually, the trailer truck crashed through the separator, slashing open the semi-truck's fuel engine. The crash ignited a large fire, causing the driver of the semi-truck to lose all control of the vehicle. The truck crashed down a large hill and eventually landed in flames on the Interstate 95 running through Stonington, Connecticut. The fire was contained, but the entire truck was horribly charred, including the body of the driver. The body was unable to be identified through body or DNA identification, so officials resorted to using dental records. The driver, Robert Allen O'Bleness, was a native of Wichita, Kansas. He was 48 years old at the time of his death. In the Mashantucket concert, Underwood paid tribute to the lost employee by belting out a tearful version of her hit single "Temporary Home", also stating that the song "gives off a whole new meaning from its previous one."
