= American Country Awards =

Annual country music awards

- Awards show logo
- Awarded for: Achievements in the Country music industry.
- Country: United States
- Hosted by: Nancy O'Dell (2010); Trace Adkins (2010-2013); Kristin Chenoweth (2011-12); Danica Patrick (2013)
- First award: 2010
- Website: http://www.theacas.com/

Television/radio coverage
- Network: Fox

The American Country Awards (ACA) was an annual country music awards show, entirely voted on by fans online. Created in 2010 by Fox, the awards honor country music artists for singles, albums, music videos and touring categories. In 2012, "Song of the Year" was added with the nominations coming from the Nashville Songwriters International Association. In addition to the CMA Awards, the ACM Awards, and the CMT Music Awards, it is the fourth major-awards show completely dedicated to the country music industry. The first two ceremonies took place at the MGM Grand Garden Arena in Las Vegas, Nevada on December 6, 2010, and December 5, 2011.

The 2012 ceremony took place at the Mandalay Bay Events Center in Las Vegas, on December 10. Luke Bryan won nine awards, including artist and album of the year, while Miranda Lambert won three. Carrie Underwood won female artist of the year and Lauren Alaina won new artist of the year. The show was executive produced by Bob Bain, produced by Paul Flattery, Tisha Fein, Kelly Brock and Fletcher Foster and directed by Michael Dempsey.

The ceremony was discontinued after 2013; in 2014, Fox announced that it would air a different country music award ceremony, the American Country Countdown Awards—which were produced by Dick Clark Productions in partnership with Cumulus Media and its syndicated radio show American Country Countdown.

== History ==
Nominees for the first inaugural awards show were announced on Monday October 18, 2010. Lady Antebellum and Easton Corbin led the field with seven nominations each, followed by Carrie Underwood with six nominations, and Miranda Lambert and Josh Turner each had five nominations. Voting continued through November 8, except for Artist of the Year; which closed on December 4. Trace Adkins was the host of the awards show. Winners in each category received a custom-made Fender guitar in lieu of trophies. In 2010, the guitar was the Stratocaster model, in 2011 it was the Telecaster. At the 2010 ceremonies, Carrie Underwood was the top winner with 6 awards, including the first-ever Artist of the Year. Rascal Flatts received the Decade Award, Toby Keith received the Visionary Artist award and Alan Jackson received the Greatest Hits Artist award. In 2011, Jason Aldean was the big winner with 6 Awards, including Artist of the year. In 2012, Luke Bryan was the big winner with seven awards, including Artist of the year. Alabama received the Greatest Hits Artist award and Toby Keith was Artist of the Decade. The artist who has won the most ACAs is Carrie Underwood with 12 (6 in 2010, 3 in 2011, 2 in 2012, 1 in 2013) Luke Bryan has the most for a Male artist with 10 (7 in 2012, 3 in 2013) and Lady Antebellum has the most for a group with 9 (4 in 2010, 1 in 2011, 2 in 2012, 2 in 2013).

Fox co-branded its New Year's Eve Live special for 2011–12 with the American Country Awards as American Country New Year's Eve Live, which featured performances by Rodney Atkins, American Idol season 10 runner-up Lauren Alaina, the Eli Young Band, Joe Nichols, and Toby Keith.

== 2010 ==
Category	Winner	Nominations
Artist of the Year	Carrie Underwood	Lady Antebellum; Miranda Lambert; Taylor Swift; Zac Brown Band
Male Artist of the Year	Brad Paisley	Jason Aldean; Luke Bryan; Kenny Chesney; Keith Urban
Female Artist of the Year	Carrie Underwood	Jewel; Miranda Lambert; Reba McEntire; Taylor Swift
Duo or Group of the Year	Lady Antebellum	Rascal Flatts; Sugarland; The Band Perry; Zac Brown Band
Breakthrough Artist of the Year	Easton Corbin	The Band Perry; Danny Gokey; Jaron and the Long Road to Love; Jerrod Niemann
Album of the Year	Play On – Carrie Underwood	Doin' My Thing – Luke Bryan; Need You Now – Lady Antebellum; Revolution – Miranda Lambert; Haywire – Josh Turner
Single of the Year	"Need You Now"– Lady Antebellum	"Do I" – Luke Bryan; "A Little More Country Than That" – Easton Corbin; "Gimmie That Girl" – Joe Nichols; "Why Don't We Just Dance" – Josh Turner
Male Artist Single of the Year	"Why Don't We Just Dance" – Josh Turner	"Do I" – Luke Bryan; "A Little More Country Than That" – Easton Corbin; "That's How Country Boys Roll" – Billy Currington; "Gimme That Girl" – Joe Nichols
Female Artist Single of the Year	"Cowboy Casanova" – Carrie Underwood	"White Liar" – Miranda Lambert; "Wrong Baby Wrong" – Martina McBride; "Consider Me Gone" – Reba McEntire; "Didn't You Know How Much I Loved You" – Kellie Pickler
Duo or Group Single of the Year	"Need You Now" – Lady Antebellum	"Little White Church" – Little Big Town; "Unstoppable" – Rascal Flatts; "Keep On Lovin' You" – Steel Magnolia; "Toes" – Zac Brown Band
Breakthrough Artist Single of the Year	"A Little More Country Than That" – Easton Corbin	"Pray for You" – Jaron and the Long Road to Love; "Lover, Lover" – Jerrod Niemann; "Keep On Lovin' You" – Steel Magnolia; "Beer on the Table" – Josh Thompson
Touring Headline Package of the Year	Play On Tour – Carrie Underwood	The Last Rodeo Tour – Brooks & Dunn; Toby Keith's American Ride Tour – Toby Keith; Shine All Night Tour – Martina McBride & Trace Adkins; Live Your Voice Tour – Tim McGraw; American Saturday Night Tour – Brad Paisley; Unstoppable World Tour – Rascal Flatts; Fall 2009 Tour – George Strait & Reba McEntire; The Incredible Machine Tour – Sugarland; Fearless Tour – Taylor Swift
Music Video of the Year	"Hillbilly Bone" – Blake Shelton ft. Trace Adkins	"A Little More Country Than That" – Easton Corbin; "Need You Now" – Lady Antebellum; "Why Don't We Just Dance" – Josh Turner; "The Man I Want to Be" – Chris Young
Male Music Video	"Hillbilly Bone" – Blake Shelton ft. Trace Adkins	A Little More Country Than That" – Easton Corbin; "Southern Voice" – Tim McGraw; "Why Don't We Just Dance" – Josh Turner; "The Man I Want to Be" – Chris Young
Female Music Video	"Cowboy Casanova" – Carrie Underwood	"White Liar" – Miranda Lambert; "Consider Me Gone" – Reba McEntire; "Didn't You Know How Much I Loved You" – Kellie Pickler; "Work Hard, Play Harder" – Gretchen Wilson
Duo or Group Music Video	"Need You Now" – Lady Antebellum	"Little White Church" – Little Big Town; "Unstoppable" – Rascal Flatts; "Keep on Lovin' You" – Steel Magnolia; "Highway 20 Ride" – Zac Brown Band
Breakthrough Artist Music Video	"A Little More Country Than That" – Easton Corbin	"Giddy On Up" – Laura Bell Bundy; "Lover, Lover" – Jerrod Niemann; "Keep On Lovin' You" – Steel Magnolia; "If I Die Young" – The Band Perry

== 2011 ==
Category	Winner	Nominations
Artist of the Year	Jason Aldean	Kenny Chesney; Lady Antebellum; Taylor Swift; Zac Brown Band
Male Artist of the Year	Brad Paisley	Jason Aldean; Luke Bryan; Kenny Chesney; Blake Shelton
Female Artist of the Year	Carrie Underwood	Miranda Lambert; Alison Krauss; Sara Evans; Taylor Swift
Duo/Group Artist of the Year	Lady Antebellum	Rascal Flatts; Sugarland; The Band Perry; Zac Brown Band
Breakthrough Artist of the Year	Chris Young	Jake Owen; Justin Moore; Eric Church; Eli Young Band
New Artist of the Year	Scotty McCreery	The Band Perry; Jerrod Niemann; Pistol Annies; Thompson Square
Album of the Year	My Kinda Party, Jason Aldean	This Is Country Music, Brad Paisley; You Get What You Give, Zac Brown Band; Speak Now, Taylor Swift; Hemingway's Whiskey, Kenny Chesney; Get Closer, Keith Urban
Single of the Year	"Voices", Chris Young	"Are You Gonna Kiss Me or Not", Thompson Square; "Let Me Down Easy", Billy Currington; "As She's Walking Away", Zac Brown Band feat. Alan Jackson; "Felt Good on My Lips", Tim McGraw
Single by a Male Artist	"My Kinda Party", Jason Aldean	"Voices", Chris Young; "Someone Else Calling You Baby", Luke Bryan; "Felt Good On My Lips", Tim McGraw; "Let Me Down Easy", Billy Currington
Single by a Female Artist	"Mama's Song", Carrie Underwood	"Turn On the Radio", Reba McEntire; "Heart Like Mine", Miranda Lambert; "Mean", Taylor Swift; "A Little Bit Stronger", Sara Evans
Single by a Duo/Group	"Are You Gonna Kiss Me or Not", Thompson Square	"Stuck Like Glue", Sugarland; "You Lie", The Band Perry; "Why Wait", Rascal Flatts; "Colder Weather", Zac Brown Band
Single by a Breakthrough Artist	"Are You Gonna Kiss Me or Not", Thompson Square	"Family Man", Craig Campbell; "What Do You Want", Jerrod Niemann; "Wildflower", The JaneDear girls; "You Lie", The Band Perry
Single by a Vocal Collaboration	"Don't You Wanna Stay", Jason Aldean feat. Kelly Clarkson	"You and Tequila", Kenny Chesney feat. Grace Potter; "Knee Deep", Zac Brown Band feat. Jimmy Buffett; "As She's Walking Away", Zac Brown Band feat. Alan Jackson; "Old Alabama", Brad Paisley feat. Alabama
Music Video of the Year	"Who Are You When I'm Not Looking", Blake Shelton	"What Do You Want", Jerrod Niemann; "Are You Gonna Kiss Me or Not", Thompson Square; "A Little Bit Stronger", Sara Evans; "I Wouldn't Be a Man", Josh Turner
Music Video by a Male Artist	"Who Are You When I'm Not Looking", Blake Shelton	"I Wouldn't Be A Man", Josh Turner; "My Kinda Party", Jason Aldean; "Put You in a Song", Keith Urban; "What Do You Want", Jerrod Niemann
Music Video by a Female Artist	"Mama's Song", Carrie Underwood	"Turn On the Radio", Reba McEntire; "A Little Bit Stronger", Sara Evans; "Look It Up", Ashton Shepherd; "Back to December", Taylor Swift
Music Video by a Duo/Group/Collaboration	"Don't You Wanna Stay", Jason Aldean feat. Kelly Clarkson	"Hello World", Lady Antebellum; "Are You Gonna Kiss Me or Not", Thompson Square; "You Lie", The Band Perry; "As She's Walking Away", Zac Brown Band feat. Alan Jackson
Music Video by a New Artist	"Are You Gonna Kiss Me or Not", Thompson Square	"Raymond", Brett Eldredge; "What Do You Want", Jerrod Niemann; "Family Man", Craig Campbell; "You Lie", The Band Perry
Touring Artist of the Year	Jason Aldean	Kenny Chesney; Keith Urban; Brad Paisley; George Strait; Carrie Underwood; Rascal Flatts; Taylor Swift; Toby Keith; Tim McGraw

== 2012 ==
Category	Winner	Nominations
Artist of the Year	Luke Bryan	Jason Aldean; Lady Antebellum; Taylor Swift; Zac Brown Band
Male Artist of the Year	Luke Bryan	Jason Aldean; Kenny Chesney; Eric Church; Toby Keith
Female Artist of the Year	Carrie Underwood	Sara Evans; Miranda Lambert; Martina McBride; Taylor Swift
Duo/Group of the Year	Lady Antebellum	Zac Brown Band; The Band Perry; Rascal Flatts; Eli Young Band
Breakthrough Artist of the Year	Jake Owen	Lee Brice; Colt Ford; Gloriana; Justin Moore
New Artist of the Year	Lauren Alaina	Hunter Hayes; Jana Kramer; Kip Moore; Pistol Annies
Album of the Year	Tailgates & Tanlines, Luke Bryan	Own the Night, Lady Antebellum; Home, Dierks Bentley; Chief, Eric Church; Red River Blue, Blake Shelton
Single of the Year	"I Don't Want This Night to End", Luke Bryan	"Tattoos on This Town", Jason Aldean; "Keep Me in Mind", Zac Brown Band; "Drink in My Hand", Eric Church; "You", Chris Young
Single by a Male	"I Don't Want This Night to End", Luke Bryan	"Tattoos on This Town", Jason Aldean; "Reality", Kenny Chesney; "Drink in My Hand", Eric Church; "You", Chris Young
Single by a Female	"Over You", Miranda Lambert	"My Heart Can't Tell You No", Sara Evans; "I'm Gonna Love You Through It", Martina McBride; "Ours", Taylor Swift; "Good Girl", Carrie Underwood
Single by a Duo/Group	"We Owned the Night", Lady Antebellum	"Keep Me in Mind", Zac Brown Band; "Banjo", Rascal Flatts; "All Your Life", The Band Perry; "Even If It Breaks Your Heart", Eli Young Band
Single by a Breakthrough	"You Don't Know Her Like I Do", Brantley Gilbert	"A Woman Like You", Lee Brice; "(Kissed You) Good Night", Gloriana; "Let It Rain", David Nail; "Alone with You", Jake Owen
Single by a New Artist	"Wanted", Hunter Hayes	"Home Sweet Home", The Farm; "Why Ya Wanna", Jana Kramer; "Cowboys and Angels", Dustin Lynch; "Somethin' 'Bout a Truck", Kip Moore
Single by a Vocal Collaboration	"Remind Me", Brad Paisley (Duet with Carrie Underwood)	"New to This Town", Kix Brooks feat. Joe Walsh; "Knee Deep", Zac Brown Band feat. Jimmy Buffett; "Feel Like a Rock Star", Kenny Chesney (Duet with Tim McGraw); "Easy", Rascal Flatts feat. Natasha Bedingfield
Music Video of the Year	"I Don't Want This Night to End", Luke Bryan	"Alone With You", Jake Owen; "God Gave Me You", Blake Shelton; "For You", Keith Urban; "You", Chris Young
Music Video by a Male	"I Don't Want This Night to End", Luke Bryan	"Alone With You", Jake Owen; "God Gave Me You", Blake Shelton; "For You", Keith Urban; "You", Chris Young
Music Video by a Female	"Over You", Miranda Lambert	"My Heart Can't Tell You No, Sara Evans; "I'm Gonna Love You Through It", Martina McBrid; "Ours", Taylor Swift; "Good Girl", Carrie Underwood
Music Video by a Duo/Group/Collaboration	"Pontoon", Little Big Town	"Dancin' Away with My Heart", Lady Antebellum; "All Your Life", The Band Perry; "(Kissed You) Good Night", Gloriana; "Angel Eyes", Love and Theft
Music Video by a New Artist	"Wanted", Hunter Hayes	"Let's Don't Call It a Night", Casey James; "Why Ya Wanna", Jana Kramer; "Cowboys and Angles", Dustin Lynch; "Somethin' 'Bout a Truck, Kip Moore
Song of the Year	"Springsteen", (Eric Church, Jeff Hyde & Ryan Tyndell) - Eric Church	"Fly Over States", (Michael Dulaney & Neil Thrasher) - Jason Aldean; "Tattoos On This Town", (Michael Dulaney, Wendell Mobley & Neil Thrasher) - Jason Aldean; "A Woman Like You", (Phil Barton, Johnny Bulford & Jon Stone) - Lee Brice; "Red Solo Cup", (Brett Beavers, Jim Beavers, Brad Warren & Brett Warren) - Toby Keith
Touring Artist of the Year	Jason Aldean	Kenny Chesney/Tim McGraw; Eric Church; Miranda Lambert; Brad Paisley

== 2013 ==
Category	Winner	Nominees
Artist of the Year	Luke Bryan	Jason Aldean; Florida Georgia Line; Blake Shelton; Taylor Swift
Male Artist of the Year	Luke Bryan	Jason Aldean; Kenny Chesney; Eric Church; Blake Shelton
Female Artist of the Year	Miranda Lambert	Kelly Clarkson; Sheryl Crow; Taylor Swift; Carrie Underwood
Duo/Group of the Year	Lady Antebellum	The Band Perry; Little Big Town; Rascal Flatts; Zac Brown Band
Breakthrough Artist of the Year	Scotty McCreery	Lee Brice; Hunter Hayes; Randy Houser; Justin Moore
New Artist of the Year	Florida Georgia Line	Kip Moore; Kacey Musgraves; Cassadee Pope; Thomas Rhett
Album of the Year	Based on a True Story..., Blake Shelton	Night Train, Jason Aldean; Here's to the Good Times, Florida Georgia Line; Two Lanes of Freedom, Tim McGraw; Pioneer, The Band Perry
Single of the Year	"Cruise", Florida Georgia Line	"Better Dig Two", The Band Perry; "How Country Feels", Randy Houser; "One of Those Nights", Tim McGraw; "Beer Money", Kip Moore
Single by a Male	"Sure Be Cool If You Did", Blake Shelton	"Every Storm (Runs Out of Rain)", Gary Allan; "One of Those Nights", Tim McGraw; "The One That Got Away", Jake Owen; "Wagon Wheel", Darius Rucker
Single by a Female	"Mama's Broken Heart", Miranda Lambert	"Easy", Sheryl Crow; "American Heart", Faith Hill; "Begin Again", Taylor Swift; "Two Black Cadillacs", Carrie Underwood
Single by a Duo/Group	"Downtown", Lady Antebellum	"Better Dig Two", The Band Perry; "Tornado", Little Big Town; "If I Didn't Have You", Thompson Square; "Goodbye in Her Eyes", Zac Brown Band
Single by a Breakthrough	"I Drive Your Truck", Lee Brice	"All Over the Road", Easton Corbin; "Somebody's Heartbreak", Hunter Hayes; "How Country Feels, Randy Houser; "Til My Last Day", Justin Moore
Single by a New Artist	"Cruise, Florida Georgia Line	"Did It for the Girl", Greg Bates; "Don't Ya", Brett Eldredge; "Redneck Crazy", Tyler Farr; "Beer Money, Kip Moore
Single by a Vocal Collaboration	"Highway Don't Care", Tim McGraw feat Taylor Swift and Keith Urban	"The Only Way I Know", Jason Aldean feat. Luke Bryan and Eric Church; "Don't Rush", Kelly Clarkson feat. Vince Gill; "Boys 'Round Here", Blake Shelton with Pistol Annies and Friends
Great American Country - Music Video of the Year	"Sure Be Cool If You Did", Blake Shelton	"Better Dig Two", The Band Perry; "Cruise", Florida Georgia Line; "Tornado", Little Big Town; "Begin Again", Taylor Swift
Music Video by a Male	"Sure Be Cool If You Did, Blake Shelton	"Take a Little Ride", Jason Aldean; "Every Storm (Runs Out of Rain)", Gary Allan; "One of Those Nights", Tim McGraw; "Wagon Wheel", Darius Rucker
Music Video by a Female Artist	"Blown Away", Carrie Underwood	"American Heart", Faith Hill; "Mama's Broken Heart", Miranda Lambert; "Someone Somewhere Tonight", Kellie Pickler; "Begin Again", Taylor Swift
Music Video by a Duo/Group/Collaboration	"Highway Don't Care", Tim McGraw feat. Taylor Swift and Keith Urban	"Better Dig Two", The Band Perry; "Tornado", Little Big Town; "Come Wake Me Up", Rascal Flatts; "If I Didn't Have You", Thompson Square
Music Video by a New Artist	"Cruise", Florida Georgia Line	"Don't Ya", Brett Eldredge; "Crying on a Suitcase", Casey James; "Beer Money", Kip Moore; "Merry Go 'Round", Kacey Musgraves
Song of the Year	"Highway Don't Care", (Mark Irwin, Josh Kear, Brad Warren & Brett Warren) - Tim McGraw feat. Taylor Swift and Keith Urban	"Better Dig Two", (Brandy Clark & Shane McAnally, & Trevor Rosen) - The Band Perry; "Cruise", (Tyler Hubbard, Brian Kelley, Joey Moi, Chase Rice, & Jesse Rice) - Florida Georgia Line; "Hard to Love, (Ben Glover, Billy Montana, John Ozier) - Lee Brice; "I Drive Your Truck", (Jessi Alexander, Connie Harrington & Jimmy Yeary) - Lee Brice; "Like Jesus Does", (Casey Beathard & Monty Criswell) - Eric Church; "Mama's Broken Heart", (Brandy Clark, Shane McAnally, Kacey Musgraves) - Miranda Lambert; Merry Go 'Round", (Shane McAnally, Kacey Musgraves & Josh Osborne) - Kacey Musgraves; "Pontoon", (Barry Dean, Natalie Hemby & Luke Laird) - Little Big Town; "Wagon Wheel", (Bob Dylan & Keith Secor) - Darius Rucker
Touring Artist of the Year	Luke Bryan	Jason Aldean; Kenny Chesney; Miranda Lambert; Brad Paisley; Rascal Flatts; George Strait; Taylor Swift; Carrie Underwood; Zac Brown Band
Worldwide Artist	Taylor Swift	

== Most wins ==
The artist who has won the most ACAs is Carrie Underwood with 12 (6 in 2010, 3 in 2011, 2 in 2012, 1 in 2013). Luke Bryan has the most for a Male artist with 10 (7 in 2012, 3 in 2013). Lady Antebellum has the most for a group with 9 (4 in 2010, 1 in 2011, 2 in 2012, 2 in 2013). In 2012, Luke Bryan won 7 Awards, including Artist of the year, the most wins in a single ceremony. He passed Jason Aldean with 7.

- Carrie Underwood (12)
- Luke Bryan (10)
- Lady Antebellum (9)
- Jason Aldean (8)
- Blake Shelton (8)
- Taylor Swift (4)
- Miranda Lambert (2)
