= Play On (Carrie Underwood album) =

Studio album by Carrie Underwood
- Released: November 2, 2009
- Studio: Maratone (Stockholm)
- Genre: Country
- Length: 48:20
- Labels: 19; Arista Nashville
- Producer: Mark Bright

Carrie Underwood chronology
Carnival Ride (2007)	Play On (2009)	Blown Away (2012)

Singles from Play On
- 1. "Cowboy Casanova" Released: September 14, 2009; 2. "Temporary Home" Released: December 14, 2009; 3. "Undo It" Released: May 24, 2010; 4. "Mama's Song" Released: September 13, 2010

Play On is the third studio album by American singer and songwriter Carrie Underwood. It was released in the United Kingdom on November 2, 2009, via 19 Recordings and Arista Nashville, a day before of its release in the United States. The album was primarily recorded in Nashville and marked a continuation of Underwood's collaboration with producer Mark Bright. During its development, Underwood worked with a broad group of songwriters, including established figures within Nashville and collaborators from outside the country music genre such as Kara DioGuardi and Mike Elizondo. More than 60 songs were recorded during the writing and recording process before the final track listing was selected.

Play On is a pop album that incorporates elements of country, with songs which addresses themes of relationships, faith, and personal reflection. The album also includes uptempo tracks such as "Cowboy Casanova" and "Undo It", alongside ballads including "Temporary Home". It was noted as stylistic continuity with Underwood's previous studio albums, Some Hearts (2005) and Carnival Ride (2007). Play On was supported by various television appearances, digital promotion, and Underwood's third headlining concert tour, the Play On Tour, which ran from 2010 to 2011 and later expanded to international dates. Four singles were released from the album, "Cowboy Casanova", "Temporary Home", "Undo It", and "Mama's Song", all of which received airplay on US country radio.

Play On debuted at number one on the US Billboard 200 and Top Country Albums charts, selling over 300,000 copies in its first week. The album later received multi-platinum certification in the United States and charted in several international markets. Critical reception was mixed, with reviews commenting on Underwood's vocal consistency while differing on the album's emphasis on crossover-oriented pop frameworks within a country context. The album received multiple nominations and awards from industry organizations following its release.

== Background and recording ==
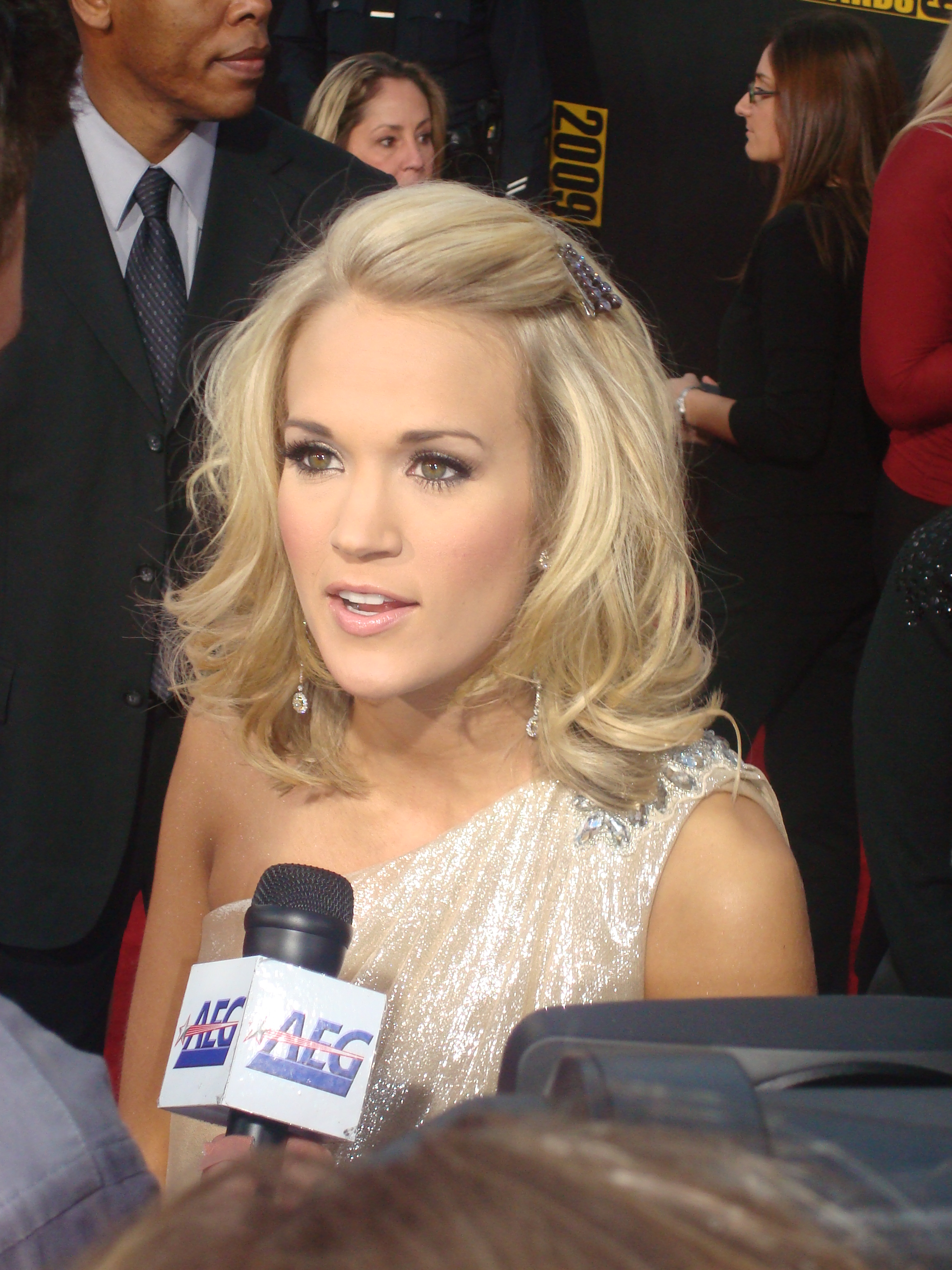
Underwood at the 2009 American Music Awards

During the recording of Play On, Underwood continued her collaboration with American producer Mark Bright, who had also produced her previous album Carnival Ride (2007) and several tracks from her debut studio album, Some Hearts (2005). Bright later recalled that the sessions allowed for more time to be devoted to arrangements, during which Underwood experimented "more than ever" with vocal textures, an approach he felt ultimately led to a result that "got it right". During this period, Underwood also collaborated with outside writers, including American singer and songwriter Ne-Yo, with whom she co-wrote material that was considered for the album, though not all of it ultimately aligned with the record's overall direction. In addition, one of the album's tracks "Look at Me" featuring American singer Vince Gill singing background vocals, was previously recorded by American singer-songwriter Alan Jackson for the 2008 soundtrack for Billy: The Early Years.

The writing process for Play On marked a shift in Underwood's collaborative approach. Whereas her earlier work had largely involved a stable group of Nashville songwriters such as Hillary Lindsey, Luke Laird, and Brett James, she expanded her circle for this album, seeking out collaborators beyond her usual Music Row network. This included working with American Idol judge and BMI's 2007 Pop Songwriter of the Year Kara DioGuardi, as well as producer and songwriter Mike Elizondo, whose background lay outside traditional country music. Laird recalled that Underwood had set aside roughly three months for the album's writing process and was intensely productive during that time, ultimately working on more than 60 songs. He noted that the session which yielded the title track marked the first collaboration between Underwood and Natalie Hemby, describing Underwood as an artist who arrives at writing sessions ready to work "all day", an approach that shaped the album's development.

Underwood's manager Simon Fuller, the chief executive of 19 Entertainment and the creator of the Idol franchise, also expressed strong confidence in Play On during its development. He suggested that the album was expected to surpass the commercial performance of its predecessor, pointing to its increased depth and stylistic variety, and described the lead single as "a complete smash", which reflects the high expectations held by her management at the time.

== Music ==
"Temporary Home"
"Temporary Home" was cited as an example of Play On departing from the relative emotional distance in Underwood's earlier studio recordings. It follows several individuals facing personal hardships, united by the belief that life on Earth is only temporary.

Play On is a pop album, despite its occasional use of traditional country instrumentation such as fiddle and steel guitar. With the influences of country and rock, it incorporates electric guitar-driven arrangements and alternates between relationship-themed songs and power ballads, while placing a strong emphasis on melodic hooks and radio-friendly songwriting. Play On also juxtaposes uptempo tracks featuring banjo and pedal steel guitar, with a larger number of earnest ballads. According to Billboard staff and Slant Magazine's Jonathan Keefe, it moves between being "in love, out of love, light-hearted and playful", showing "small but encouraging signs" of artistic growth, even as the album leaves some issues unresolved from Some Hearts and Carnival Ride.

Play On adopts a broadly communicative approach, particularly on tracks such as "Unapologize" and "Temporary Home". Its individual songs draw on specific stylistic cues—including a 1970s pop-rock on "Someday When I Stop Loving You", a pop-driven framework on "This Time", a rocker approach on "Undo It", and a dance hall–tinged rhythmic palette on "Cowboy Casanova", shaped in part by Mike Elizondo's production influence. "Someday When I Stop Loving You" is a slow ballad that drew comparisons to Sheryl Crow's 1994 single, "Strong Enough".

== Promotion ==
=== Marketing ===
In early October 2009, Underwood's promotional campaign for Play On expanded across multiple digital platforms. Around this time, her website was relaunched with enhanced fan-oriented features, including updated news sections, blogs, photo galleries, official videos, tour dates, and an integrated online music store which offeres previews and lyrics from her previous albums. The site also served as the exclusive outlet for a limited Play On bundle, which included the album alongside a numbered collectible print from the album's photoshoot, with a portion of the prints personally signed by Underwood.

As part of Play On's promotional rollout, Sony Music Nashville coordinated a digital release strategy in partnership with iTunes. According to the label's vice president of digital business, Heather McBee, individual tracks from the album were scheduled to be released weekly beginning October 3, 2009, as retailer exclusives, which culminates in a "Complete My Album" promotion upon the album's full release on November 3. The campaign was designed to gradually introduce new material while encouraging advance engagement with the record through digital platforms. In support of the campaign, each weekly release was preceded by a 48-hour preview hosted on Billboard, while Underwood was also featured in both the website and the October 16 print cover of Billboard. Fans who completed the album purchase through iTunes additionally received an exclusive bonus track, Underwood's recording of "O Holy Night", as part of the promotion.

On October 16, 2009, Underwood performed in Singapore to promote the album to the Asian media. She also performed in Late Show with David Letterman on November 2, and a day later, she performed special outdoor concert at Lincoln Center on Good Morning America. On November 5, Underwood rounded out her week with a visit to Live with Regis and Kelly. She further debuted several of her singles at the 43rd Country Music Association Awards with Brad Paisley. Underwood also appeared on several shows to promote her album, including Good Morning America on November 10 and Grand Ole Opry on November 14. On November 16, she performed the song "Temporary Home" in an episode of The Tonight Show with Conan O'Brien. She also performed in The Ellen DeGeneres Show on November 18, Jimmy Kimmel Live! on a day later, American Music Awards on November 22, and CNN International on November 26.

Play On's deluxe edition was released on June 10, 2011, in Australia and New Zealand. She visited the former for two weeks to promote the edition's release. Issued as a two-disc set, the edition comprises the standard album and a bonus disc containing six of Underwood's previous number-one singles: "Jesus, Take the Wheel", "Before He Cheats", "So Small", "Just a Dream", "Last Name", and "Don't Forget to Remember Me". It also features Underwood's version of Mötley Crüe's song, "Home Sweet Home".

=== Singles and other songs ===
"Cowboy Casanova", co-written by Underwood, Mike Elizondo and Brett James, served as the lead single for Play On on September 14, 2009. 12 days before its release, on September 2, the song was leaked via YouTube. The music video for the song was unveiled in October. "Cowboy Casanova" debuted on the US Hot Country Songs chart at number 26, marking then-highest debut by a female artist on the chart. It also debuted at number 96 on the US Billboard Hot 100 and later jumped to 11 in its second week, becoming one of the biggest single-week upwards on the chart of all time. At the 45th ACM Awards, the song received a nomination for Song of the Year, where Underwood was also nominated as an artist and a composer. The song has sold 2,300,000 copies in the United States and has been certified 2× Platinum by Recording Industry Association of America (RIAA).

Prior to the release of the album, three promotional singles were released exclusively on iTunes Store. Billboard also posted a 60-second clip of each song. Two promotional singles followed—"Mama's Song" on October 13, and "Temporary Home" on October 20. The latter received multiple forms of promotion, including performances on The Tonight Show with Conan O'Brien, the television special A Home for the Holidays, Underwood's personal CMT Invitation Only event and her Christmas variety show, Carrie Underwood: An All-Star Holiday Special. Underwood also performed the song at the 2010 ACM Awards and on her Play On Tour. On October 27, "Undo It" was released as the third and final promotional single off the album.

"Temporary Home" was first serviced to country radio starting the week of December 14, 2009, becoming the second single from Play On. The accompanying music video was unveiled in February 2010, and it won Inspirational Video of the Year at the Inspirational Country Music Awards. The song topped on the Hot Country Songs chart—being her ninth number one song in the process— and peaked at number 41 on the Hot 100. Underwood won Best Live Performance at the 2010 CMT Awards for her performance during her personal CMT Invitation Only. The song also received a nomination at the 53rd Grammy Awards for Best Female Country Vocal performance. "Temporary Home" sold 1,093,000 copies, certified Platinum by RIAA.

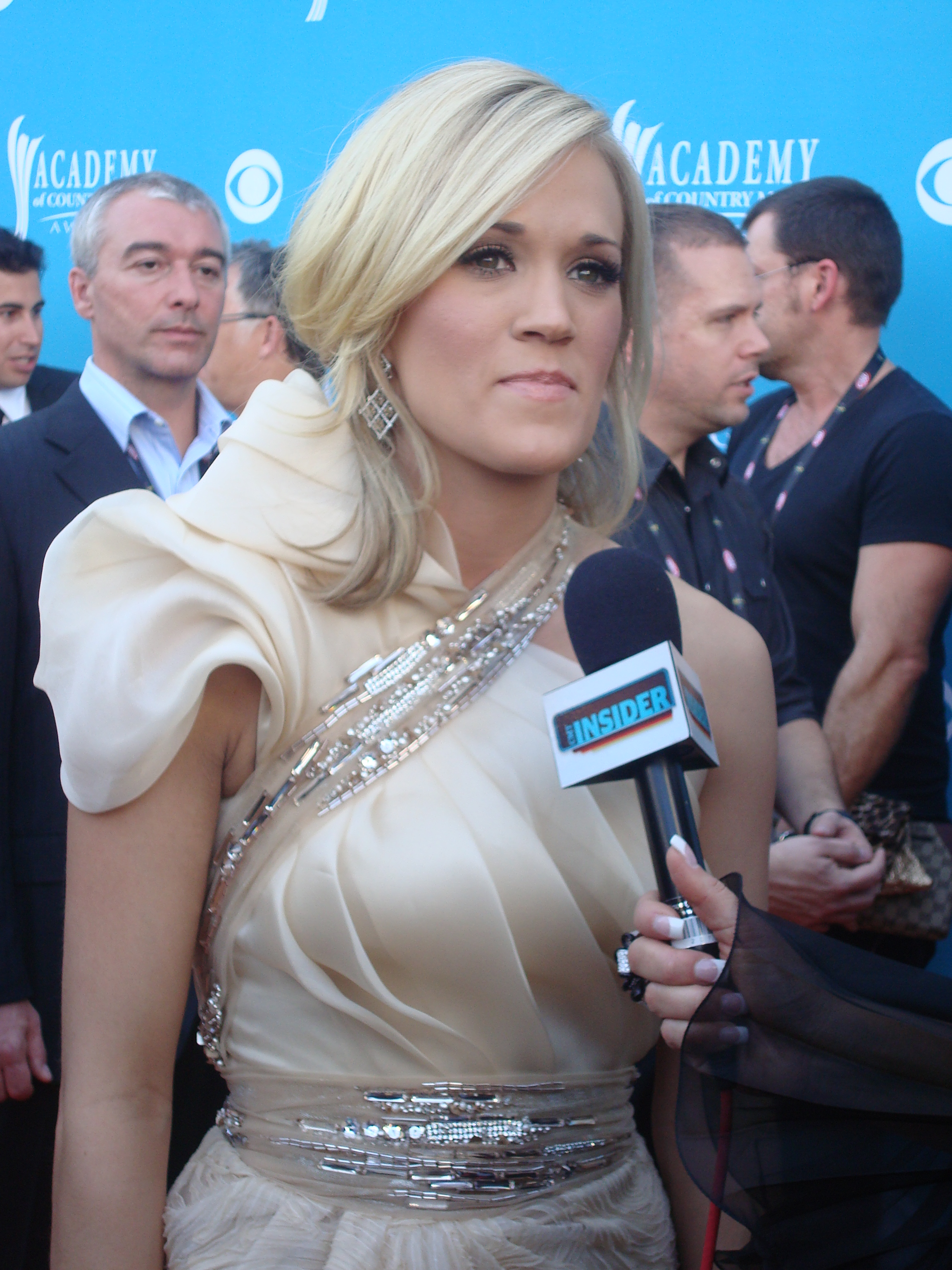
Underwood in April 2010

On May 24, 2010, the third single "Undo It" was released. Underwood performed the song on the season finale of American Idol and at the 2010 CMT Music Awards. The song peaked at number 23 on the Hot 100, giving Underwood her eleventh Top 40 single. It also reached number one on Hot Country Songs chart, being her tenth number 1 song in it. "Undo It" was nominated for the 2010 Teen Choice Award for Choice Country Song. Additionally, it has sold 1,600,000 copies, making it a certified Platinum single.

"Mama's Song" was serviced to country radio on September 13, becoming Play On's fourth and final single. The music video was filmed in August, and premiered at Vevo on September 24. "Mama's Song" eventually reached the number two position on the Hot Country Songs charts, and sold more than 31,000 copies in its debut week. It has been certified Platinum by RIAA, selling 443,000 copies overall. At the 54th Grammy Awards, the song was nominated for Best Country Solo Performance.

After Underwood performed "Change" during the 2010 Idol Gives Back, the song received a 2,001% gain in sales, selling 9,000 to a total of 53,000 digital downloads. "Look at Me", a cover of a song originally by Alan Jackson, debuted at No. 22 on Country Digital Songs in 2014 after it appeared in a viral video, and sold 18,000 copies for the week for a total of 80,000 sold.

=== Tour ===
Underwood announced her third headlining tour, Play On Tour, on December 10, 2009. Her opening acts and guest performers for the spring tour were Craig Morgan and Sons of Sylvia. The second leg included Sons of Sylvia and country singer Billy Currington. The first leg began in Reading, Pennsylvania on March 11, and concluded in Saint Paul, Minnesota at the Minnesota State Fair on August 31. The second leg began on September 25, in Portland, Oregon, and concluded on December 19, in Calgary, Canada. The tour was ranked at number 2 on Billboard's Hot Tours in October 2010.

In December 2010, the tour ranked at number 19 for the largest North American tours of 2010, and again at number 31 for the largest tours worldwide for the 2010 touring year. The tour made a collective total of $38,300,000 and reached to over one million fans. On May 16, 2011, it was announced that Underwood would travel to Australia in June 2011, to promote Play On for her first international headline tour.

== Critical reception ==
Professional ratings
Aggregate scores
Source	Rating
Metacritic	54/100
Review scores
Source	Rating
AllMusic	2.5/5 stars
Billboard	4/5 stars
Entertainment Weekly	B
Los Angeles Times	2/4 stars
Paste	5.7/10
PopMatters	2/10
Robert Christgau	(dud)
Slant Magazine	2.5/5 stars
St. Petersburg Times	3/5 stars
USA Today	3/4 stars

Play On received generally mixed reviews from music critics, achieving a score of 54 out of 100 from Metacritic based on "mixed or average reviews".

Billboard staff described Play On as her strongest release to date, writing that Underwood appeared "comfortable in her own skin" on a "wide-ranging album" that moves between love, heartbreak, and lighthearted moments. Entertainment Weekly's Leah Greenblatt viewed the album's approach as highly formulaic but effective, arguing that Underwood had perfected "one of the most well-honed formulas in the business", which balances assertive breakup anthems with sweeping ballads, a strategy that has "served her well". In a review for The Boston Globe, Sarah Rodman emphasized Underwood's technical control and songwriting maturity, noting that she "sings the hell out of" all 13 tracks with "cool efficiency". Rodman highlighted her comfort within a dual framework of sassy rockers and reverent ballads and observed that the former were "unsurprisingly, a lot more fun". Jon Caramanica of The New York Times suggested that Underwood's consistency came at the expense of innovation. While praising her technical execution, he argued that her familiar personas resulted in songs that felt "musically and emotionally complacent", citing tracks such as "Look at Me" and "Undo It" as examples of strong structure that ultimately "never quite sizzle". Slant Magazine author Jonathan Keefe argued that Play On showed "small but encouraging signs" of artistic growth, even if it remained "a good long way from being great". While he noted that Underwood still lacked the grit and intuitive phrasing of country music's strongest vocalists, Keefe suggested that the album's better moments hinted she could become "more than a technically proficient cipher", though overzealous production and uneven material ultimately limited that potential.

AllMusic's Stephen Thomas Erlewine noted that while Underwood remained "nominally a country artist", Play On largely functioned as "crossover pop pure and simple", citing the Shania Twain–styled drive of "Cowboy Casanova" and the album's emphasis on power ballads. He acknowledged the album's "slick pleasures", particularly on "Quitter" and "This Time", while Erlewine praised their solid melodies and Underwood's enduring "small-town charm", even as he criticized attempts to frame her primarily as a diva. Stephen M. Deusner of Paste characterized the album as "more public than personal" and argued that its broad, message-driven approach resulted in a "scattershot collection". While praising tracks such as "Songs Like This", "This Time", and the restrained "Look at Me", Deusner contended that the record too often "mistakes bombast for sincerity" and sentimentality for emotional depth. PopMatters writer Joshua O'Neill described Play On as an album that adhered "slavishly" to a proven formula, which made it difficult to distinguish strong material from weaker tracks. O'Neill acknowledged moments that were "half-way listenable", but he dismissed the ballads as emotionally shallow, and concluded that the album was "definitely not good" and lacked a defining single on the level of "Before He Cheats".

=== Accolades ===
Award	Category	Result	Ref.
45th Academy of Country Music Awards	Album of the Year	Nominated	
1st American Country Awards	Album of the Year	Won	
2010 Teen Choice Awards	Choice Album - Country	Nominated	
44th Country Music Association Awards	Album of the Year	Nominated	
2010 American Music Awards	Favorite Country Album	Won	

== Commercial performance ==
Play On debuted at number one on the US Top Country Albums chart as well as the US Billboard 200, with first week sales of 318,000 copies. It rated as then-highest first week sales for a female artist in 2009. In its second week, the album slipped to number three with sales of 128,000. Play On spent four consecutive weeks at number one in Top Country Albums Chart. (Note: List of Top Country Albums Chart: "Top Country Albums". Billboard. November 21, 2009. Archived from the original on March 21, 2018.; "Top Country Albums". Billboard. November 28, 2009. Archived from the original on March 21, 2018.; "Top Country Albums". Billboard. December 5, 2009. Archived from the original on March 21, 2018.; "Top Country Albums". Billboard. December 12, 2009. Archived from the original on July 2, 2016.) By October 2015, the album had sold 2,300,000 copies in the US, and it was certified 3× Platinum by RIAA on October 24, 2016. The album has also charted in other countries; in United Kingdom, the album debuted at number 93 on the UK Albums Chart. In Canada, the album debuted at number two with 15,000 sales. In Australia, it peaked at number 14, certificating Gold status and being her first album to do so. Play On has since sold over three million copies worldwide.

Play On charted on two Billboard's Year-End Charts, Billboard 200 and Top Country Albums, at number seventy three and number 15 in 2009. In December 2010, the album landed at number four for Country Albums and number twelve for Billboard 200. The following year, it charted at number 37 for Country Albums and number 176 for Billboard 200.

== Track listing ==
All tracks were produced by Bright, while "Quitter" was co-produced by Max Martin and Shellback.

Standard edition
No.	Title	Writer(s)	Length
1.	"Cowboy Casanova"	Carrie Underwood; Mike Elizondo; Brett James	3:56
2.	"Quitter"	Max Martin; Shellback; Savan Kotecha	3:40
3.	"Mama's Song"	Underwood; Kara DioGuardi; Marti Frederiksen; Luke Laird	4:00
4.	"Change"	Katrina Elam; Josh Kear; Chris Tompkins	3:13
5.	"Undo It"	Underwood; DioGuardi; Frederiksen; Laird	2:58
6.	"Someday When I Stop Loving You"	Hillary Lindsey; Steve McEwan; Gordie Sampson	4:03
7.	"Songs Like This"	Marty Dodson; Jerry Flowers; Tom Shapiro	2:37
8.	"Temporary Home"	Underwood; Laird; Zac Maloy	4:29
9.	"This Time"	Lindsey; McEwan; Sampson	3:52
10.	"Look at Me" (featuring Vince Gill)	Jim Collins; Paul Overstreet	3:16
11.	"Unapologize"	Underwood; Lindsey; Raine Maida; Chantal Kreviazuk	4:38
12.	"What Can I Say" (featuring Sons of Sylvia)	Underwood; McEwan; David Hodges	3:57
13.	"Play On"	Underwood; Laird; Natalie Hemby	3:41
Total length:			48:20

Australia and New Zealand deluxe edition
No.	Title	Writer(s)	Length
14.	"Don't Forget to Remember Me"	Morgane Hayes; Kelley Lovelace; Gorley	4:00
15.	"Jesus, Take the Wheel"	James; Lindsey; Sampson	3:46
16.	"Before He Cheats"	Chris Tompkins; Kear	3:19
17.	"So Small"	Underwood; Laird; Lindsey	3:45
18.	"Just a Dream"	Steve McEwan; Lindsey; Sampson	4:44
19.	"Last Name"	Underwood; Laird; Lindsey	4:01
20.	"Home Sweet Home"	Nikki Sixx; Vince Neil; Tommy Lee	3:38

=== Notes ===
- The compact disc version of the deluxe edition is a two-disc package.
- The track numbers on disc 2 are numbered 1 – 7, which corresponds to numbers 14 – 20 listed above.

== Credits and personnel ==
Credits were adapted from the liner notes and Tidal.

=== Recording locations ===
- Maratone Studios; Stockholm

=== Vocals ===
- Ashley Clark – lead vocals (12)
- Lisa Cochran – backing vocals (3, 4, 5, 7, 9, 11, 13)
- Perry Coleman – backing vocals (3, 5, 9, 11)
- Vince Gill – backing vocals(10)
- Wes Hightower – backing vocals(4, 6, 7, 13)
- Hillary Lindsey – backing vocals (6, 8)
- Sons of Sylvia – backing vocals (12)
- Carrie Underwood – lead vocals, backing vocals

=== Musicians ===
- Beth Beeson – French horn (4)
- Tom Bukovac – electric guitar (3, 5, 7, 8, 10–13)
- Ashley Clark – acoustic guitar (12)
- Adam Clark – mandolin (12)
- Austin Clark – lap steel guitar (12)
- Eric Darken – percussion (3, 4, 5, 7, 8, 9, 11, 13)
- Shannon Forrest – drums (3, 4, 6, 8–13)
- Jon Graboff – guitar (2), steel guitar (2)
- Carl Gorodetzky – string contractor (4)
- Kenny Greenberg – electric guitar (1, 5–8)
- Aubrey Haynie – fiddle (1, 5, 10)
- Mike Johnson – steel guitar (1, 3, 6–10, 13)
- Charles Judge – keyboards (3, 4, 5, 7–13), string arrangements and composer (4)
- Jennifer Kummer – French horn (4)
- Lee Levine – clarinet (4)
- Sam Levine – flute (4)
- Max Martin – keyboards (2)
- Chris McHugh – drums (1, 5, 7)
- Jerry McPherson – electric guitar (4, 9)
- Gordon Mote – acoustic piano (3, 8)
- Jimmy Nichols – keyboards (4, 6, 7, 9, 10, 11), acoustic piano (5, 13)
- Eberhard Ramm – music copyist (4)
- Shellback – guitar (2)
- Jimmie Lee Sloas – bass guitar (1, 3–9, 12, 13)
- Christopher Stevens – keyboards (1), programming (1, 2)
- Ilya Toshinsky – acoustic guitar (3–13)
- Jonathan Yudkin – cello (3), viola (3), violin (3, 8), string arrangements and composer (3)

=== The Nashville String Machine (4) ===
- Anthony LaMarchina, Carole Rabinowitz and Julie Tanner – cello
- Jack Jezioro and Craig Nelson – string bass
- Monisa Angell, Bruce Christensen, Jim Grosjean, Betsy Lamb and Kristin Wilkinson – viola
- David Angell, Janet Darnall, David Davidson, Conni Ellisor, Carl Gorodetzky, Stefan Petrescu, Pamela Sixfin, Alan Umstead, Catherine Umstead, Mary K. Vanosdale, Bruce Wethey and Karen Winkelmann – violin

=== Group vocals (1) ===
- Chris Ashburn
- Tristin Brock-Jones
- Shawn Daughtery
- Nathan Dickinson
- Kerri P. Edwards
- Josh Fulmer
- Kerrie Hardwick
- Wes Hightower
- Tim Hunze
- Brett James
- Aaron Kasdorf
- Kelly King
- Kristen Wines

=== Production ===
- Chris Ashburn – assistant recording (1–13), mix assistant (1, 3–13), additional recording (2)
- Adam Ayan – mastering
- Tracy Baskett Fleaner – packaging
- Derek Bason – recording (1, 3–13), mixing (1, 3–13), additional recording (2)
- Mark Bright – producer (1, 3–13)
- Tristin Brock-Jones – additional and assistant recording (1, 3–13)
- Shawn Daughtery – additional and assistant recording (1, 3–13)
- Nathan Dickinson – digital editing
- Judy Forde Blair – creative director, liner notes
- Mike "Frog" Griffith – production coordinator
- Tammie Harris Cleek – imaging production
- Scott McDaniel – creative director, cover design
- Max Martin – producer (2), recording (2)
- Julie Matos – styling
- Matthew Rolston – photography
- Shellback – producer (2), recording (2)
- Christopher Stevens – additional recording (1, 3–13)
- Todd Tidwell – additional recording (1, 3–13)
- Francesca Tolot – make-up
- Robert Vetica – hair
- Kristen Wines – production assistant

== Charts ==
=== Weekly charts ===
Chart (2009–2011)	Peak position
Australian Albums (ARIA)	14
Canadian Albums (Billboard)	2
Canadian Country Albums (Billboard)	1
Irish Albums (IRMA)	91
Scottish Albums (OCC)	84
UK Albums (OCC)	93
UK Country Artist Albums (OCC)	2
US Billboard 200	1
US Top Country Albums (Billboard)	1

=== Year-end charts ===
Chart (2009)	Position
US Billboard 200	73
US Top Country Albums (Billboard)	15
Chart (2010)	Position
Australian Country Albums (ARIA)	39
US Billboard 200	12
US Top Country Albums (Billboard)	4
Chart (2011)	Position
Australian Country Albums (ARIA)	10
US Billboard 200	176
US Top Country Albums (Billboard)	37
Chart (2012)	Position
Australian Country Albums (ARIA)	32

=== Decade-end charts ===
Chart (2010–2019)	Position
US Billboard 200	168
US Top Country Albums (Billboard)	41

== Certifications ==
Region	Certification	Certified units/sales
Australia (ARIA)	Gold	35,000^{^}
Canada (Music Canada)	Platinum	80,000^{^}
United States (RIAA)	3× Platinum	2,300,000
^{^} Shipments figures based on certification alone.

== Release history ==
Release dates and formats
Region	Date	Format	Edition	Label	Ref.
United Kingdom	November 2, 2009	CD; digital download; streaming	Standard	Arista Nashville; 19	
Singapore	November 2, 2009	CD; digital download; streaming	Standard	Arista Nashville; 19	
Various	November 3, 2009	CD; digital download; streaming	Standard	Arista Nashville; 19	
Australia	November 6, 2009	CD; digital download; streaming	Standard	Arista Nashville; 19	
Japan	May 19, 2010	CD; digital download; streaming	Standard	Arista Nashville; 19	
Australia	June 10, 2011	CD	Deluxe	Arista Nashville; 19	
New Zealand	June 10, 2011	CD	Deluxe	Arista Nashville; 19	
Various	June 10, 2011	Digital download; streaming	Deluxe	Arista Nashville; 19	
