= Temporary Home =

Single by Carrie Underwood

from the album Play On
- Released: October 20, 2009
- Length: 4:28 (album version); 4:19 (radio version)
- Label: Arista Nashville
- Songwriters: Luke Laird; Zac Maloy; Carrie Underwood
- Producer: Mark Bright

Carrie Underwood singles chronology
"Cowboy Casanova" (2009)	"Temporary Home" (2009)	"Undo It" (2010)

Music video
- "Temporary Home" on YouTube

"Temporary Home" is a song co-written and recorded by American country music artist Carrie Underwood. It was released in December 2009 as the second official single from her third studio album, Play On (2009). Before being released as a single, the song was made available to iTunes on October 20, 2009. A promotional music video for the song was released in November 2009, and an official music video followed in February 2010.

In December 2010, the song was ranked at number 25 on Billboard's Top Country Songs of 2010. It was also nominated for Best Female Country Vocal Performance at the 53rd Grammy Awards.

== Background ==
Underwood was inspired by the book The Purpose Driven Life by Pastor Rick Warren, who wrote that this world is a "temporary home" and that when we leave here, it is not the end of existence. She said, "I thought of a little boy in a foster situation, and he knows where he's going, and the place where he is isn't where he should be, but he'll get there someday." She met with songwriters Luke Laird and Zac Maloy to write the song, provide the idea and the title, and had the melody.

On November 16, 2009, Underwood performed the song on The Tonight Show with Conan O'Brien. She also performed this song on Home for the Holidays, a CBS special that Faith Hill hosted on December 23, 2009. Before her performance at Foxwoods Casino, Connecticut, Underwood's tour bus crashed and the driver was killed. During her performance, Underwood got emotional and said "This song means so much to me..." and gave a tearful performance.

== Critical reception ==
"Temporary Home" (2009)
A 26-second sample from Underwood's "Temporary Home".

Reviews of the song have been mainly positive. Billboard gave a positive review saying that "Hope reverberates through the scenarios as each character senses that life on Earth is but a temporary trial... Vocally, she has never sounded more heartfelt and compelling. 'Temporary Home' is a powerful song that's stirring but not preachy, and Underwood's performance is sure to resonate strongly with listeners." Country Universe gave the track an A− grade saying "It’s not the narrative that powers this song, but the depth and strength of her personal conviction. From the inclusion of neglected members of society to the intricate shades of fully-invested emotion to the telling last line –"this is our temporary home"–, the song provides a glimpse at the person behind the artist."

Roughstock was also positive in their review saying, "In 'Temporary Home', three characters all take on some interpretation of the title phrase: a literal sense for the foster child bounced from home to home, a struggling young mother in a halfway house, and a spiritual sense for the man on his deathbed. What could've easily been a mountain of glurge instead becomes simple and effective." Jim Malec of 9513 was less enthusiastic about the song, saying "It's hard to relate to, or have much sympathy for, people who we know aren'5 real. As a result, 'Temporary Home' has a very dull emotional affect—we're sad because hard times are sad, and we're happy because we hope tomorrow will be better, but we know the whole scenario is constructed to preach a particular point of view. Between the first note and the last, not a single lyric works to reveal something about ourselves or strives to tell us a story—its impact is blunt, hits fast and fades quickly." He was positive about Underwood's vocals saying, "Underwood shows off those refined chops on new single 'Temporary Home'; her vocal is beautifully delicate, and the downtempo pace of the song grants a welcome reprieve for her typically bombastic production."

== Chart performance ==
"Temporary Home" debuted at number 92 on the U.S. Billboard Hot 100 and at number 66 on the Canadian Hot 100 and peaked at number 41 and 65 respectively. It also debuted at number 48 on the U.S. Billboard Hot Country Songs chart on the week ending December 12, 2009, and on the chart week of April 10, 2010, the song became her ninth number one single and peaked at number 34 on the U.S. Christian Songs chart.

As of October 2015, "Temporary Home" has sold 1,093,000 copies in the United States.

== Awards and nominations ==
=== 53rd Grammy Awards ===
Year	Nominee / work	Award	Result
2010	"Temporary Home"	Best Female Country Vocal Performance	Nominated

=== 16th Inspirational Country Music Awards ===
Year	Nominee / work	Award	Result
2010	"Temporary Home"	Inspirational Music Video of the Year	Won
2010	"Temporary Home"	Inspirational Mainstream Country Song of the Year	Nominated

=== 2010 CMT Music Awards ===
Year	Nominee / work	Award	Result
2010	"Temporary Home" (from CMT Invitation Only)	CMT Performance of the Year	Won

=== 2010 CMA Triple-Play Awards ===
Year	Nominee / work	Award	Result
2010	"Temporary Home"	Triple-Play Songwriter (along with "Cowboy Casanova" and "Undo It")	Won

=== 2011 BMI Awards ===
Year	Nominee / work	Award	Result
2011	"Temporary Home"	Songwriter of the Year	Won

== Music video ==
Originally, a live performance from CMT's Invitation Only, was released as a music video to promote the single. A concept music video for the song was filmed in Nashville, Tennessee, and premiered on CMT on February 4, 2010.

The video was directed and produced by Deaton Flanigen. In the song's music video Underwood is shown riding around town in a taxi cab. During her journey she watches a young boy with his new foster mother, and a mother trying desperately to get a job. Finally, she reaches her destination, a hospital room with an elderly man, presumably her grandfather, lying on his deathbed. Between the third verse and third chorus on the video, Underwood goes in and talks to her dying grandfather (portrayed by Jerry Foster in the video), cries and hugs him. Throughout the video, Underwood is also shown performing the song while standing among trees in the winter, with snowfall coming down behind her.

"It's kind of like one person on their way somewhere, which is a theme of this song. You're headed someplace, and then they kind of share these special moments with the characters. But through that, I felt like everybody's on their own journey, and we all cross paths. So I felt like it was close enough to the story, but just far enough away to where it kind of provided a different angle."

== Charts ==
Chart (2009–2010)	Peak position
Canada (Canadian Hot 100)	65
Canada Country (Billboard)	2
US Billboard Hot 100	41
US Hot Christian Songs (Billboard)	34
US Hot Country Songs (Billboard)	1

=== Year-end charts ===
Chart (2010)	Position
US Country Songs (Billboard)	25

== Certifications ==
Region	Certification	Certified units/sales
United States (RIAA)	2× Platinum	2,000,000^{‡}
^{‡} Sales+streaming figures based on certification alone.

== Release history ==
Region	Date	Format	Label
United States	October 20, 2009	Digital download; streaming	Arista Nashville
Canada	October 20, 2009	Digital download; streaming	Sony
United States	December 14, 2009	Airplay	Arista Nashville
Canada	December 14, 2009	Airplay	Sony
