= Undo It =

2010 single by Carrie Underwood

Single by Carrie Underwood

from the album Play On
- Released: May 24, 2010
- Genre: Country pop
- Length: 2:57
- Label: Arista Nashville
- Songwriters: Kara DioGuardi; Marti Frederiksen; Luke Laird; Carrie Underwood
- Producer: Mark Bright

Carrie Underwood singles chronology
"Temporary Home" (2009)	"Undo It" (2010)	"Mama's Song" (2010)

Music video
- "Undo It" on YouTube

"Undo It" is a song written by Carrie Underwood, Kara DioGuardi, Marti Frederiksen, and Luke Laird. It was made available to digital retailers on October 27, 2009, and was released as an official single on May 24, 2010. The song is the third single from Underwood's third studio album, Play On.

Underwood performed the song at the 2010 American Idol finale, as well as at the 2010 CMT Music Awards. "Undo It" has sold 1.6 million copies in the United States, making it the 7th biggest song of her career. It was also her first song to chart in Australia, peaking at Number 85.

"Undo It" was ranked number 29 on Billboard's year-end charts for Top Country Songs.

== Content ==
Carrie Underwood "Undo It" (2009)
17 second sample from Carrie Underwood's "Undo It".

Underwood told The Boot that the idea for the "Undo It" hook came accidentally. "The guys had their guitars and they were playing something kind of bluesy, and Kara's got such a great R&B sense about her," she said. "And I started, 'Na, na, na-ing' to whatever they were playing. And they were like, 'What if that was the hook?' I said, 'Aw, I don't know?' And before you knew it, we had 'Uh, uh, uh undo it.' I mean, who would have thought? How do you write that down on paper? It was something that it didn't take that long to write and it's so much fun to sing on stage, and people get into it."

The song is composed in A minor, with a main chord pattern of A_{5}-C_{2}-G_{5}-D. It has a moderately slow tempo of 80 beats per minute.

== Critical reception ==
Uuli Thanki of Engine 145 gave the song a thumbs-down, calling it "a third-rate tune from Kelly Clarkson's reject pile" and saying that it had "deeply stupid lyrics." Roughstock critic Matt Bjorke rated the song two-and-a-half stars out of five, saying that it had "catchy repeatable lyrics" but concluded his review by saying "she can do so much better." In his review for Allmusic, Stephen Thomas Erlewine called the song "strained sassiness." Billboard critic Deborah Evans Price compared it to the "vengeful Carrie persona" of "Before He Cheats" (2005), saying that it had "crisp, compelling" production. Kevin John Coyne of Country Universe gave the song an A− calling "Undo It" a short, sweet, and undeniably catchy song which features both "We Will Rock You" drum riffs and twangy fiddle, as if those two things together are as natural as peanut butter and chocolate.

== Music video ==
CMT premiered the video for "Undo It" on May 7, 2010. The video features shots of Underwood performing the song in concert along with shots of the background video played during the performance of the song in the Play On Tour. The video was directed by Chris Hicky. It was filmed on April 6, 2010, at the Columbus, Ohio concert.

== Live performances ==
Underwood performed the song live for American Idol's season finale on May 26. She again performed it for the Today show on July 30. She performed it live for the 2010 CMT Music Awards on June 9, 2010. She included it for a hits medley during the 2010 CMT Artists of the Year special, airing on December 3.

== Chart performance ==
"Undo It" debuted at number 43 on the U.S. Billboard Hot Country Songs chart for the week of May 1, 2010. The song hit number one for the week of August 7, 2010, giving Underwood her tenth number one on this chart. The song debuted at number 87 on the U.S. Billboard Hot 100 before the release of her album Play On, and re-entered the chart at number 95 following its release as an official single. After performing the song on the finale of American Idol, the song rose to a new peak of number 25, becoming the second most successful single from Play On. It then rose to number 23 after performing it at the 2010 CMT Music Awards. The song became her eleventh Top 40 Hot 100 hit. The song re-entered once again at number 67 and stayed there for five more weeks before it dropped off the chart. On the week of June 27, 2011, "Undo It" entered the Australian Singles Chart at number 85, becoming her first entrance to the chart in her career.

As of October 2015, "Undo It" has sold 1,600,000 copies in the United States.

=== Weekly charts ===
Chart (2010–2011)	Peak position
Australia (ARIA)	85
Canada (Canadian Hot 100)	43
Canada Country (Billboard)	2
US Billboard Hot 100	23
US Adult Pop Airplay (Billboard)	25
US Hot Country Songs (Billboard)	1

=== Year-end charts ===
Chart (2010)	Position
US Billboard Hot 100	88
US Country Songs (Billboard)	29

== Release history ==
Region	Date	Format	Label
United States	October 27, 2009	Music download	Arista Nashville
Canada	October 27, 2009	Music download	Sony Music
United States	May 24, 2010	Airplay	Arista Nashville
Canada	May 24, 2010	Airplay	Sony Music
United Kingdom	May 25, 2010	Airplay	Sony Music
Australia	June 10, 2011	Music download, airplay	Sony Music
New Zealand	June 10, 2011	Music download, airplay	Sony Music

== Awards and nominations ==
=== 2010 Teen Choice Awards ===
Year	Nominee / work	Award	Result
2010	"Undo It"	Choice Country Song	Nominated

=== 2010 CMA Triple-Play Awards ===
Year	Nominee / work	Award	Result
2010	"Undo It"	Triple-Play Songwriter (along with "Cowboy Casanova" and "Temporary Home")	Won

=== 2011 CMT Music Awards ===
Year	Nominee / work	Award	Result
2011	"Undo It"	Video of the Year	Nominated
2011	"Undo It"	Female Video of the Year	Nominated

=== 2011 BMI Awards ===
Year	Nominee / work	Award	Result
2011	"Undo It"	Songwriter of the Year	Won

== Certifications ==
Region	Certification	Certified units/sales
United States (RIAA)	2× Platinum	1,600,000
