= Just a Dream (Carrie Underwood song) =

Single by Carrie Underwood

from the album Carnival Ride
- Released: July 21, 2008
- Recorded: 2007
- Studio: Starstruck Studios (Nashville, TN)
- Genre: Country; country pop
- Length: 4:44
- Label: Arista Nashville
- Songwriters: Gordie Sampson; Steve McEwan; Hillary Lindsey
- Producer: Mark Bright

Carrie Underwood singles chronology
"Praying for Time" (2008)	"Just a Dream" (2008)	"I Told You So" (2009)

Music video
- "Carrie Underwood - Just A Dream" on YouTube

"Just a Dream" is a country song, released as the fourth single from Carrie Underwood's second studio album, Carnival Ride. The song was written by Gordie Sampson, Steve McEwan, and Hillary Lindsey. The song was officially released to radio on July 21, 2008. A video for the song was released on August 5, 2008. The song was nominated for a 2010 Grammy Award for Best Female Country Vocal Performance.

The song debuted at number 96 on the U.S. Billboard Pop 100 chart without any radio release at the end of the released week of Carnival Ride and dropped out the week later. It debuted on Billboard Hot Country Songs at number 45 one week before its official release. On the issue date August 23, 2008 the song debuted at number 98 on U.S. Billboard Hot 100, it later peaked at number 29 becoming her tenth top 30 hit on that chart. For the week of November 8, 2008, the song became Underwood's sixth straight number one country single, as well as her seventh number one single overall, eighth including all other charts. It stayed at the top of the chart for two weeks. It has been certified 2× Platinum by RIAA, and as of November 2015, it has sold 1,280,000 million copies.

== Content ==
"Just a Dream" is a ballad backed by an acoustic guitar, drum kit, bass guitar and a string section. The song chronicles an 18-year-old woman going to the church in her wedding dress, with the listener believing she's going to her wedding. However, as the song goes on, it's revealed that she's actually going to the funeral of her husband, who was a soldier killed in action. During the funeral, she wishes that everything going on at the moment is all "just a dream." The woman is eventually given a folded up flag, which is only given to the next of kin, which includes spouse, blood relative or someone who has been granted permission by the courts to be their next of kin.

== Writing and inspiration ==
Songwriters Steve McEwan, Hillary Lindsey and Gordie Sampson composed the song over the space of a few days in collaborative songwriting sessions in Nashville. According to McEwan, in an interview with HitQuarters, it was Lindsey that first conceived the concept of the song,

"Hillary had this thing in her head, “Wouldn’t it be great to write a song about a woman where you think through the song that she’s getting married but then you suddenly realise she’s actually going to her husband’s funeral.” That’s how it started."

McEwan refutes the notion that there was a deliberate political subtext to the song and instead insists their primary aim was simply to write something 'heartfelt'. The trio were nevertheless conscious of political interpretation having rejected the earlier title of "American Dream" for making the song "overly political".

== Critical reception ==
"Just a Dream" was well-received and garnered several positive reviews from critics.

Matt C. of Engine 145, a country music blog, gave the song a "thumbs up" review, calling it one of the best performances of Underwood's in an album that otherwise contained "bombastic vocals". Although he said that the first verse was written in a convoluted fashion ("a swing and a miss by the writers"), he also thought that Underwood's vocal performance compensated enough to make the song viable.

Country Universe reviewer Kevin J. Coyne also gave a favorable review of the single, opining that it "illustrates just how bone-chillingly good a vocalist [Underwood] is when the material is on level with her talent." The single was also ranked number fourteen on the blog's countdown for the Top 40 best country music singles of 2008.

Billboard gave it a positive review as well: "The fourth single from Carrie Underwood's double-platinum Carnival Ride finds the singer charting new territory. Previous singles have stuck to a similar lyrical theme, contrasting between Underwood's girl-next-door image with inspirational or family-centered songs… 'Just a Dream' delivers the heartbreaking, storytelling side of Nashville with the kind of song usually reserved for vets like one of her idols Reba McEntire or Martina McBride. Underwood convincingly sells the story of a young widow of a soldier killed in combat, using shades of her emotive vocal to convey anger and despair. While the subject matter is sensitive in this day and time—particularly for flag-waving country pundits—it is rooted in reality. Add Underwood's adoration by the format's listeners and there is bound to be an immediate and receptive response to this beautifully executed song."

== Music video ==
The music video was released in August 2008, and was Underwood's final video to be directed by Roman White. It begins with Underwood sitting with her boyfriend Jonathan Roberts, played by Jeff Kasser, an officer in the military, in a car listening to Eddy Arnold's "Make the World Go Away", and trying not to talk about the inevitability of him leaving for war. As she imagines what it would be like to walk down the aisle and marry him, Underwood's smile and white dress transform into a black mourning dress and tears as she walks down the aisle to her husband's coffin; submerged with scenes of Underwood receiving news of his death. It ends with a still shot of Underwood at the casket with flag in hand panning out to reveal a sunny, breezy landscape.

== Release history ==
Region	Date	Format	Label
United States	July 21, 2008	Airplay	Arista Nashville
Canada	July 21, 2008	Airplay	Sony Music
United Kingdom	July 21, 2008	Airplay	Sony Music

== Charts ==
=== Weekly charts ===
Chart (2007)	Peak position
US Billboard Pop 100	96
Chart (2008)	Peak position
Canada Hot 100 (Billboard)	50
Canada Country (Billboard)	2
US Billboard Hot 100	29
US Hot Country Songs (Billboard)	1

=== Year-end charts ===
Chart (2008)	Position
US Country Songs (Billboard)	16

== Awards and nominations ==
=== 52nd Grammy Awards ===
Year	Nominee / work	Award	Result
2010	"Just a Dream"	Best Female Country Vocal Performance	Nominated

=== CMT Music Awards ===
Year	Nominee / work	Award	Result
2009	"Just a Dream"	Video of the Year	Nominated
2012	"Just a Dream"/"Dream On"	CMT Performance of the Year	Nominated

=== 44th Academy of Country Music Awards ===
Year	Nominee / work	Award	Result
2009	"Just a Dream"	Music Video of the Year	Nominated

=== 2009 Country Universe Reader's Choice Awards ===
Year	Nominee / work	Award	Result
2009	"Just a Dream"	Music Video of the Year	Won
2009	"Just a Dream"	Single of the Year	Won

== See also ==
- List of anti-war songs
