= Mama's Song =

Single by Carrie Underwood

from the album Play On
- Released: September 13, 2010
- Length: 4:00
- Label: Arista Nashville
- Songwriters: Carrie Underwood; Kara DioGuardi; Marti Frederiksen; Luke Laird
- Producer: Mark Bright

Carrie Underwood singles chronology
"Undo It" (2010)	"Mama's Song" (2010)	"There's a Place for Us" (2010)

Music video
- "Mama's Song" on YouTube

"Mama's Song" is a song recorded by American singer Carrie Underwood. It was released in September 2010 as the fourth and final single from her third studio album, Play On (2009). The song was co-written by Underwood along with Kara DioGuardi, Marti Frederiksen, and Luke Laird, all of whom wrote her previous single "Undo It".

Underwood performed the song on the 44th CMA Awards on November 10, 2010. The song was nominated for Best Country Solo Performance at the 54th Grammy Awards.

== Content ==
The song is a ballad where the female narrator sings to her mother, telling her to let her go and not to worry as the daughter moves out and begins her own life as the bride of the man she loves.

== Critical reception ==
Stephen Thomas Erlewine of Allmusic described the song as "sticky" and "tacky." Sean Daly of the St. Petersburg Times compared it unfavorably to "Change" on the same album, saying that both were "too precious, too preachy." Slant Magazine reviewer Jonathan Keefe said that it had cliché lyrics but praised Underwood's "understated vocal" as well as the comparatively softer production. Bobby Peacock of Roughstock gave it three-and-a-half stars out of five, saying that she "proves yet again that she can just sing without having to reach for the rafters on every note, and the production is agreeably mellow and acoustic."

== Commercial performance ==
As a promotional single, before the release of Play On, "Mama's Song" has sold 39,000 copies in United States. As a confirmed single, after the release of Play On, it has sold 442,000 copies in the same country. The song has been certified Platinum by the RIAA.

=== Chart performance ===
In October 2009, in advance of the album's release, "Mama's Song" charted at number 77 on the Billboard Hot 100 and number 68 on the Canadian Hot 100. It was the first of three promotional singles from the album. On the Hot Country Songs charts dated for the week ending September 4, 2010, it entered at number 55. It has also re-entered the Billboard Hot 100 at number 87 upon its release as an official single and has reached a new peak of 56. It is one of Underwood's singles to reach the Hot 100 that has charted outside the top 50, with "Love Wins" and "Drinking Alone." On the week of January 17, 2011 it peaked at number two on Hot Country Songs and became Underwood's third single to peak at number two.

=== Awards and nominations ===
2011 Inspirational Country Music (ICM) Awards

Year	Nominee / work	Award	Result
2011	"Mama's Song"	Inspirational Mainstream Song	Nominated
2011	"Mama's Song"	Inspirational Music Video	Nominated

2011 BMI Awards

Year	Nominee / work	Award	Result
2011	"Mama's Song"	Songwriter of the Year	Won

2011 American Country Awards

Year	Nominee / work	Award	Result
2011	"Mama's Song"	Female Single of the Year	Won
2011	"Mama's Song"	Female Music Video of the Year	Won

54th Grammy Awards

Year	Nominee / work	Award	Result
2011	"Mama's Song"	Best Country Solo Performance	Nominated

== Music video ==
The official music video for "Mama's Song" premiered on Vevo on September 24, 2010. It features both Underwood's husband Mike Fisher, and her mother Carole. It was filmed in Nashville, and was directed by Shaun Silva. It tells the story of a woman who meets her true love and moves away from her mom.

== Charts ==
Chart (2010–2011)	Peak position
Canada (Canadian Hot 100)	68
Canada Country (Billboard)	10
US Billboard Hot 100	56
US Hot Country Songs (Billboard)	2

=== Year-end charts ===
Chart (2011)	Position
US Country Songs (Billboard)	50

== Certifications ==
Region	Certification	Certified units/sales
United States (RIAA)	Platinum	442,000

== Release history ==
Region	Date	Format	Label
United States	October 13, 2009	Digital download; streaming	Arista Nashville
Canada	October 13, 2009	Digital download; streaming	Sony
United States	September 13, 2010	Airplay	Arista Nashville
Canada	September 13, 2010	Airplay	Sony Music
Australia	November 3, 2010	Airplay	Sony Music
Philippines	November 6, 2010	Airplay	Sony Music
