= Cowboy Casanova =

Single by Carrie Underwood

from the album Play On
- Released: September 14, 2009
- Genre: Country rock
- Length: 3:56 (album version); 3:41 (radio edit)
- Label: Arista Nashville
- Songwriters: Mike Elizondo; Brett James; Carrie Underwood
- Producer: Mark Bright

Carrie Underwood singles chronology
| "Home Sweet Home" (2009) | "Cowboy Casanova" (2009) | "Temporary Home" (2009) |

Music video
- "Cowboy Casanova" on YouTube

"Cowboy Casanova" is a song by American singer Carrie Underwood. It was written by Underwood, Mike Elizondo, and Brett James. It was released on September 14, 2009, by Arista Nashville as the lead single from her third studio album, Play On. The song sold 2,300,000 copies, making it the fourth-biggest single of her career behind "Jesus, Take the Wheel", "Before He Cheats", and "Blown Away".

The song received positive reviews from critics and became the fastest climbing country single of 2009. It also became Underwood's eighth number one country single in the United States. The single was certified four-times Platinum by the Recording Industry Association of America (RIAA).

== Background ==
After the end of her "Carnival Ride Tour", in February 2009, Underwood began writing songs for her new album Play On. She collaborated with a number of producers which included Brett James, one of the three co-writers of her hit single "Jesus, Take the Wheel", and Mike Elizondo, who had collaborated with Eminem and Dr. Dre. Elizondo came up with the main melody of the song, to which James and Underwood set the lyrics. James then suggested the title "Cowboy Casanova" off a list of potential titles that he had, and the lyrics talk about a male character who is a "devil in disguise." In an interview with CMT Underwood said,

"I think to every woman, this song would be telling a story about someone they know or met or has tried to pick them up in a bar". "We're not trashing this guy, we're just warning these other girls about him."

An unfinished version of the song leaked online on September 2, 2009, after receiving airplay from KMPS-FM in Seattle. The label then rush-released the official version to Underwood's YouTube channel on September 3, 2009. It was officially made available for download on September 14, 2009.

== Composition ==
"Cowboy Casanova" is a moderately paced country song. It incorporates elements of rock-inspired guitar riffs and background gang vocals in the introduction and verses, and also the violin (played as a fiddle) and banjo-esque qualities which travel into the refrain. The song is composed in D minor, set in common time with a tempo of 120 beats per minute. Underwood's vocals span from A_{3} to D_{5}.

== Critical reception ==
The song has been met with generally favorable reviews. Billboard reviewed the song favorably, stating that it "gives [Underwood] the chance to display the sassy side of her musical persona, which made previous hit "Before He Cheats" such an impact record. Blessed with a versatile set of pipes that make the best of any tune, Underwood shines on this steamy upbeat number". Matt Bjorke of Roughstock also gave a favorable review, saying, "Although the song borrows familiar melodic themes, the production is sparkling; Carrie sings the verses with rapid-fire precision and the hook is just infectious. This may very well be my favorite Carrie Underwood single yet." Kevin Coyne of Country Universe said that on “Cowboy Casanova”, Underwood makes a strong attempt but doesn't quite pull it off. We’re left with just a decent single that doesn't feel quite country enough or quite pop enough to make it a keeper, therefore giving her a grade of B−.

== Commercial reception ==
"Cowboy Casanova" was released on September 14, 2009, for digital download. The song logged a first week sales of 110,236 copies in downloads. The song also made Underwood the only solo country artist in 2009 to debut a digital single above the 100,000. The song also became the fastest climbing single in Underwood's career and also the fastest-climbing single of 2009 in the country music genre. Additionally, the song gave Underwood the most Top 10 hits on the country chart this decade - 10 top 10 singles followed by Faith Hill and Martina McBride each with nine.

As of October 2015, 2,300,000 copies of "Cowboy Casanova" were sold in the US. It has been certified 4× Platinum, being Underwood's fourth single to do so.

== Music video ==
The music video was filmed on September 2, 2009, in New Orleans, Louisiana. It premiered during CMT's Big New Music Weekend on October 2, 2009.

The video was directed by Theresa Wingert and it features Underwood and an entourage of attractive female dancers all wearing flapper party gowns. She warns the video's audience, as well as her entourage, about smooth-talking attractive men and their true intentions. An attractive man sporting a fancy outfit that consists of an overcoat and a fedora gazes at the scene with interest. The man, a good representation of the song's topic, seemingly has designs on Underwood and as the video progresses the dancers become dressed in revealing clothing, consisting of garters and corsets. Eventually, Underwood, along with her empowered entourage, has a showdown with the man in a back alley and defiantly spurns his advances, leading him to give up and walk away. The video also became Underwood's first choreographed video.

== Awards and nominations ==
=== 45th Academy of Country Music Awards ===
| Year | Nominee / work | Award | Result |
|---|---|---|---|
| 2010 | "Cowboy Casanova" | Song of the Year | Nominated |

=== CMT Music Awards ===
| Year | Nominee / work | Award | Result |
|---|---|---|---|
| 2010 | "Cowboy Casanova" | Video of the Year | Won |
| 2010 | "Cowboy Casanova" | Female Video of the Year | Nominated |

=== 1st American Country Awards ===
| Year | Nominee / work | Award | Result |
|---|---|---|---|
| 2010 | "Cowboy Casanova" | Female Music Video of the Year | Won |
| 2010 | "Cowboy Casanova" | Female Single of the Year | Won |

=== French Country Music Awards ===
| Year | Nominee / work | Award | Result |
|---|---|---|---|
| 2010 | "Cowboy Casanova" | Music Video of the Year | Won |

=== 2010 CMA Triple-Play Awards ===
| Year | Nominee / work | Award | Result |
|---|---|---|---|
| 2010 | "Cowboy Casanova" | Triple-Play Songwriter (along with "Temporary Home", "Undo It") | Won |

== Chart performance ==
"Cowboy Casanova" debuted at number 26 on the U.S. Billboard Hot Country Songs chart for the week of September 19, 2009 and reached the number one spot in its tenth week, becoming Underwood's eighth number one on that chart and also her fastest climbing song at that time. "Cowboy Casanova" was also marked as Underwood's fastest climbing song on the Billboard Hot 100 chart, climbing to number 11 only one week after its official release. The song made its debut on the U.S. Billboard Hot 100 at number 96, making a jump to number 11 in its second week, becoming her sixth top 20 Hot 100 hit.

=== Charts ===
| Chart (2009) | Peak position |
|---|---|
| Canada Hot 100 (Billboard) | 16 |
| Canada Country (Billboard) | 2 |
| US Billboard Hot 100 | 11 |
| US Hot Country Songs (Billboard) | 1 |
| US Adult Pop Airplay (Billboard) | 21 |

=== Year-end charts ===
| Chart (2009) | Position |
|---|---|
| US Country Songs (Billboard) | 45 |

== Certifications ==
Certifications for Cowboy Casanova
| Region | Certification | Certified units/sales |
|---|---|---|
| Canada (Music Canada) | Gold | 5,000^{^} |
| United States (RIAA) | 4× Platinum | 4,000,000^{‡} |
^{^} Shipments figures based on certification alone.^{‡} Sales+streaming figures based on certification alone.
