= List of number-one country singles of 2008 (Canada) =

Canada Country was a chart published weekly by Billboard magazine.

This 50-position chart lists the most popular country music songs, calculated weekly by airplay on 31 country music stations across the country as monitored by Nielsen BDS. Songs are ranked by total plays. As with most other Billboard charts, the Canada Country chart features a rule for when a song enters recurrent rotation. A song is declared recurrent if it has been on the chart longer than 30 weeks and is lower than number 20 in rank.

These are the Canadian number-one country singles of 2008, per the BDS Canada Country Airplay chart.

Note that Billboard publishes charts with an issue date approximately 7–10 days in advance.

Issue date	Country Song	Artist	Ref.
January 5	"Our Song"	Taylor Swift	
January 12	"Letter to Me"	Brad Paisley	
January 19	"Our Song"	Taylor Swift	
January 26	"Letter to Me"	Brad Paisley	
February 2	"Letter to Me"	Brad Paisley	
February 9	"Letter to Me"	Brad Paisley	
February 16	"Letter to Me"	Brad Paisley	
February 23	"In My Next Life"	Terri Clark	
March 1	"All-American Girl"	Carrie Underwood	
March 8	"All-American Girl"	Carrie Underwood	
March 15	"All-American Girl"	Carrie Underwood	
March 22	"All-American Girl"	Carrie Underwood	
March 29	"All-American Girl"	Carrie Underwood	
April 5	"You're Gonna Miss This"	Trace Adkins	
April 12	"You're Gonna Miss This"	Trace Adkins	
April 19	"You're Gonna Miss This"	Trace Adkins	
April 26	"I Saw God Today"	George Strait	
May 3	"Picture to Burn"	Taylor Swift	
May 10	"I'm Still a Guy"	Brad Paisley	
May 17	"I'm Still a Guy"	Brad Paisley	
May 24	"I'm Still a Guy"	Brad Paisley	
May 31	"I'm Still a Guy"	Brad Paisley	
June 7	"I'm Still a Guy"	Brad Paisley	
June 14	"I'm Still a Guy"	Brad Paisley	
June 21	"Good Time"	Alan Jackson	
June 28	"Good Time"	Alan Jackson	
July 5	"Good Time"	Alan Jackson	
July 12	"Good Time"	Alan Jackson	
July 19	"Good Time"	Alan Jackson	
July 26	"Good Time"	Alan Jackson	
August 2	"Put a Girl in It"	Brooks & Dunn	
August 9	"Good Time"	Alan Jackson	
August 16	"You Look Good in My Shirt"	Keith Urban	
August 23	"You Look Good in My Shirt"	Keith Urban	
August 30	"You Look Good in My Shirt"	Keith Urban	
September 6	"You Look Good in My Shirt"	Keith Urban	
September 13	"Waitin' on a Woman"	Brad Paisley	
September 20	"Waitin' on a Woman"	Brad Paisley	
September 27	"Waitin' on a Woman"	Brad Paisley	
October 4	"Everybody Wants to Go to Heaven"	Kenny Chesney	
October 11	"Everybody Wants to Go to Heaven"	Kenny Chesney	
October 18	"Everybody Wants to Go to Heaven"	Kenny Chesney	
October 25	"Everybody Wants to Go to Heaven"	Kenny Chesney	
November 1	"Everybody Wants to Go to Heaven"	Kenny Chesney	
November 8	"Everybody Wants to Go to Heaven"	Kenny Chesney	
November 15	"Everybody Wants to Go to Heaven"	Kenny Chesney	
November 22	"Love Story"	Taylor Swift	
November 29	"Love Story"	Taylor Swift	
December 6	"Already Gone"	Sugarland	
December 13	"Already Gone"	Sugarland	
December 20	"Already Gone"	Sugarland	
December 27	"Country Boy"	Alan Jackson	

== See also ==
- 2008 in music
- List of number-one country singles of 2008 (U.S.)
