= List of Hot Country Songs number ones of 2008 =

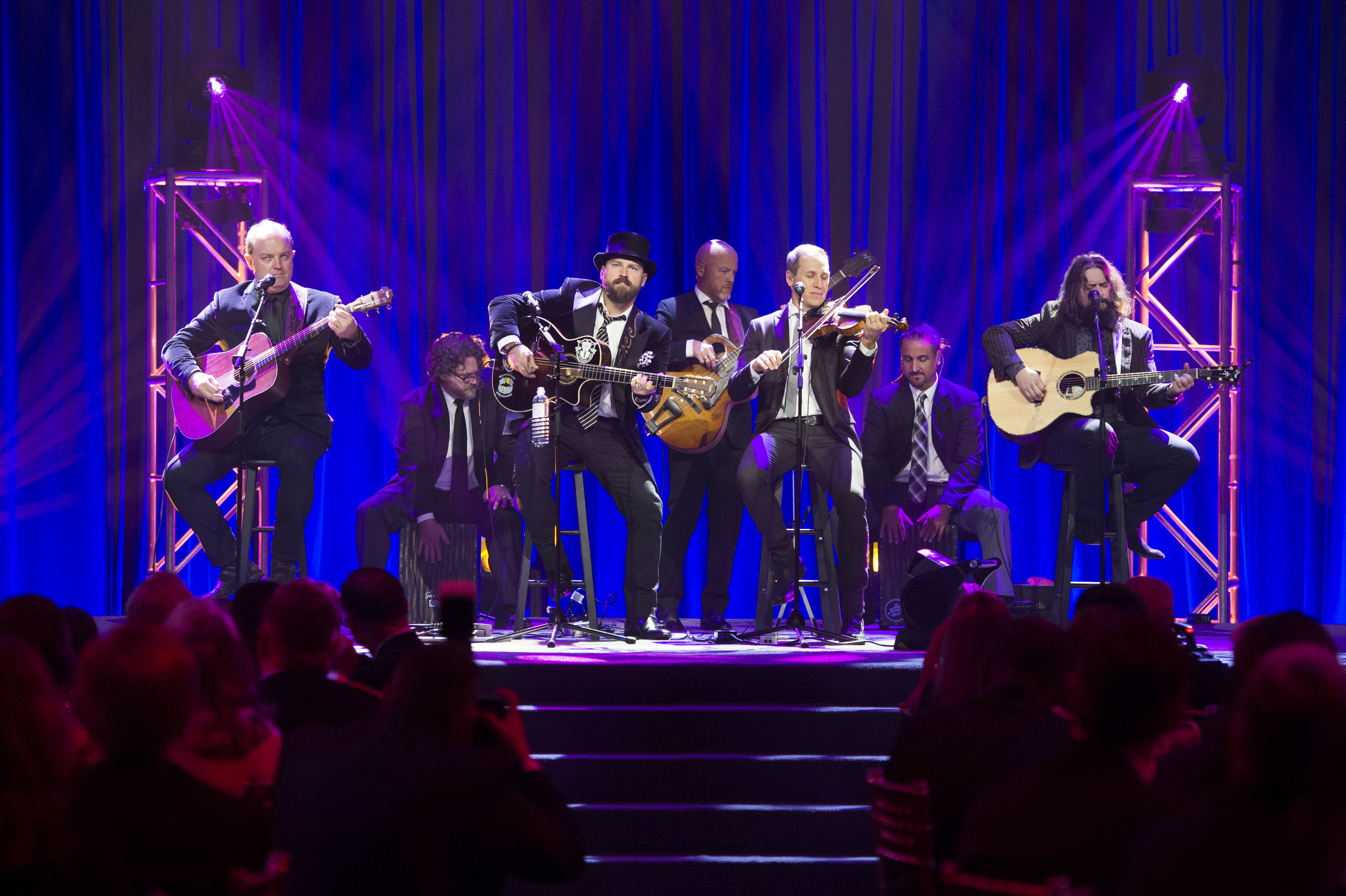
Zac Brown Band reached number one for the first time in December 2008.

Hot Country Songs is a chart that ranks the top-performing country music songs in the United States, published by Billboard magazine. In 2008, 26 different songs topped the chart in 52 issues of the magazine, based on weekly airplay data from country music radio stations compiled by Nielsen Broadcast Data Systems.

At the start of the year the number one was "Our Song" by Taylor Swift, which had risen to the top in the issue dated December 22, 2007. It remained at the top of the chart until the issue dated February 2, when it was replaced by "Letter to Me" by Brad Paisley. Both Swift and Paisley had three songs at number one in 2008. Paisley reached the top with "Letter to Me", "I'm Still a Guy" and "Waitin' on a Woman" and Swift with "Our Song", "Should've Said No" and "Love Story". Carrie Underwood also had three chart-toppers in 2008 with "All-American Girl", "Last Name" and "Just a Dream". Paisley and Swift tied for the most weeks at number one by an artist in the year, each spending eight weeks at the top. The last number one of the year was "Roll with Me", the final number one single by Montgomery Gentry.

Four acts topped the chart for the first time in 2008. The first was James Otto, who reached number one for the first time in May with "Just Got Started Lovin' You". Although it only spent two weeks at number one, Otto's song was ranked number one on Billboard's year-end chart of the most popular country songs. In October, former Hootie & the Blowfish frontman Darius Rucker scored his first country number one with "Don't Think I Don't Think About It", making him the first African-American to have a solo number one since Charley Pride in 1983. Jimmy Wayne and the Zac Brown Band also topped the chart for the first time in 2008. Additionally, veteran reggae band The Wailers received a secondary credit on Kenny Chesney's song "Everybody Wants to Go to Heaven" for one of its two weeks in the top spot. This gave the group its first appearance at number one on Hot Country Songs and marked the first appearance at number one on the chart by any act of the reggae genre and the first by any act from Jamaica.

== Chart history ==
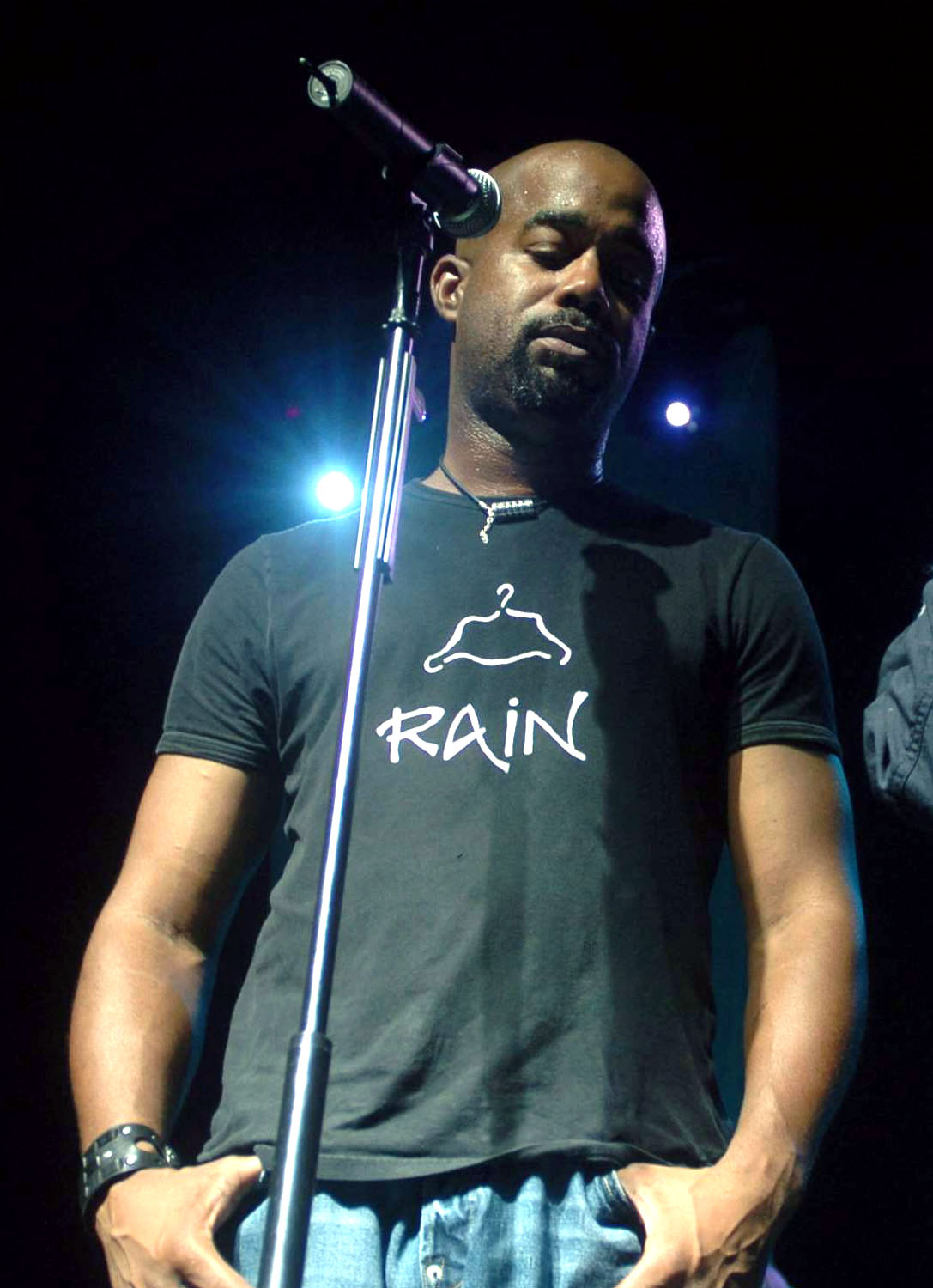
Darius Rucker was the first African-American singer to have an individual country number one in 25 years.

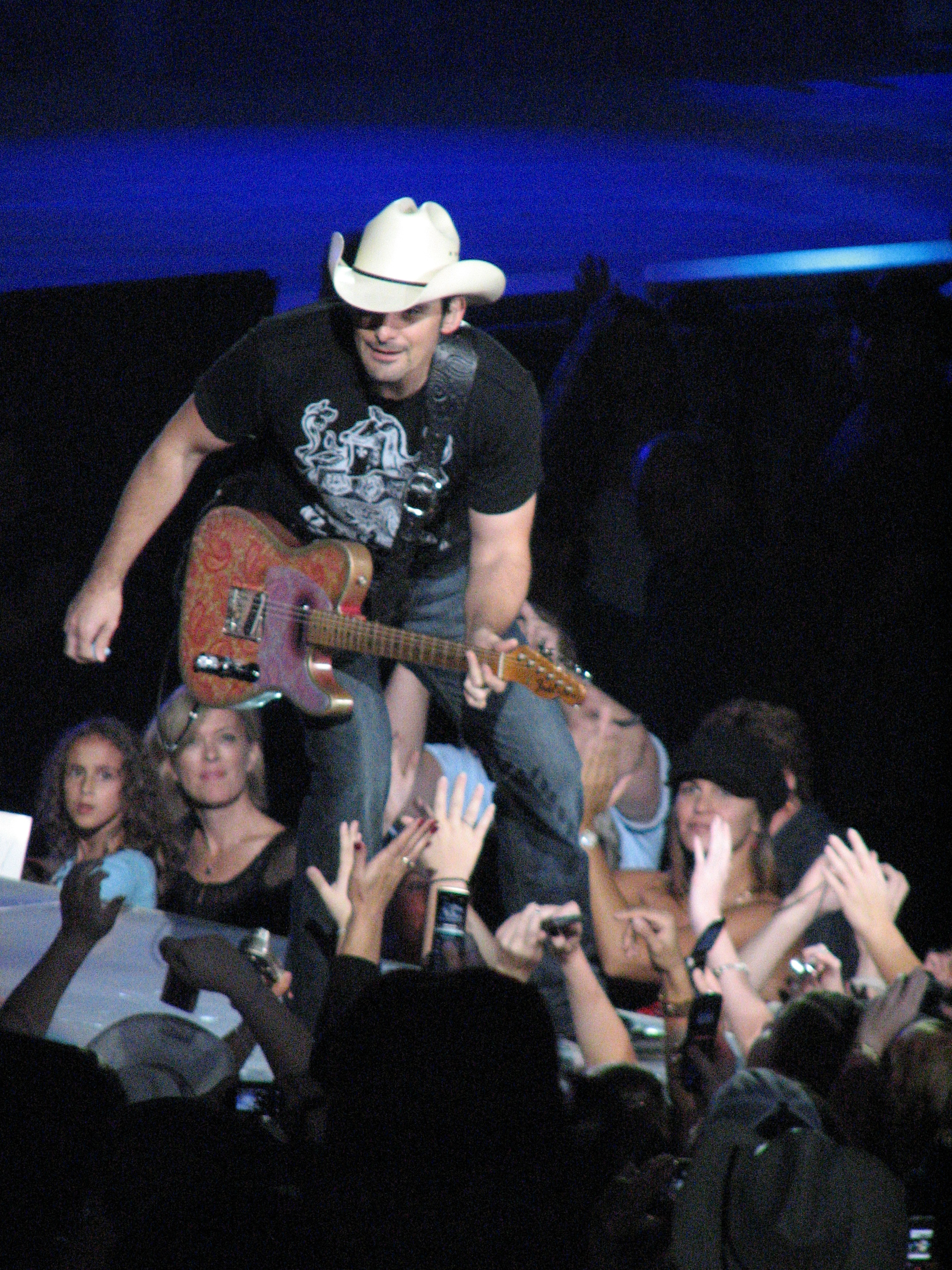
Brad Paisley spent eight weeks at number one in 2008.

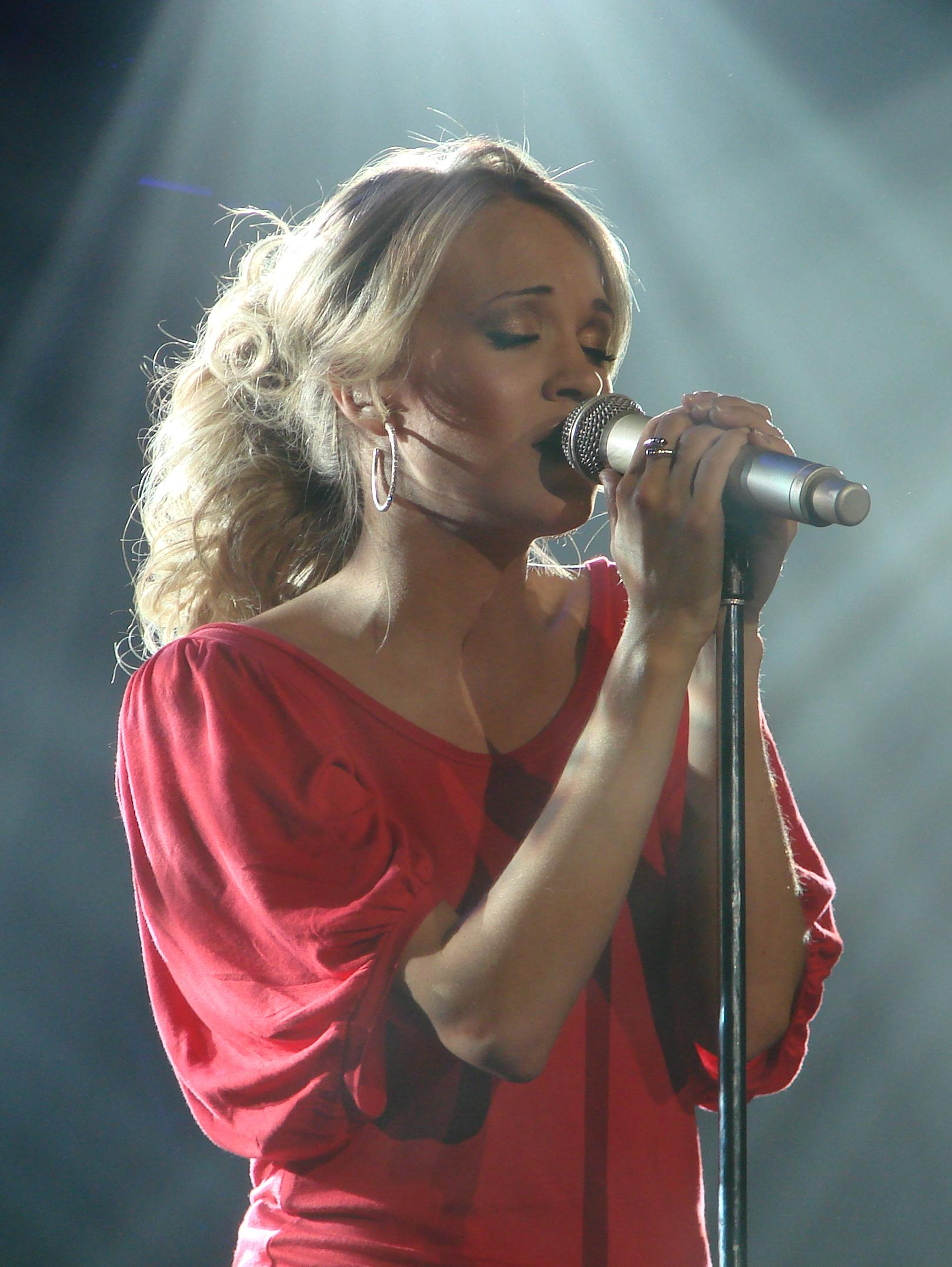
Carrie Underwood achieved three number-one hits in 2008.

Issue date	Title	Artist(s)	Ref.
January 5	"Our Song"	Taylor Swift	
January 12	"Our Song"	Taylor Swift	
January 19	"Our Song"	Taylor Swift	
January 26	"Our Song"	Taylor Swift	
February 2	"Letter to Me"	Brad Paisley	
February 9	"Letter to Me"	Brad Paisley	
February 16	"Letter to Me"	Brad Paisley	
February 23	"Letter to Me"	Brad Paisley	
March 1	"Cleaning This Gun (Come On In Boy)"	Rodney Atkins	
March 8	"Cleaning This Gun (Come On In Boy)"	Rodney Atkins	
March 15	"All-American Girl"	Carrie Underwood	
March 22	"All-American Girl"	Carrie Underwood	
March 29	"Small Town Southern Man"	Alan Jackson	
April 5	"Small Town Southern Man"	Alan Jackson	
April 12	"You're Gonna Miss This"	Trace Adkins	
April 19	"You're Gonna Miss This"	Trace Adkins	
April 26	"You're Gonna Miss This"	Trace Adkins	
May 3	"I Saw God Today"	George Strait	
May 10	"I Saw God Today"	George Strait	
May 17	"Just Got Started Lovin' You"	James Otto	
May 24	"Just Got Started Lovin' You"	James Otto	
May 31	"I'm Still a Guy"	Brad Paisley	
June 7	"I'm Still a Guy"	Brad Paisley	
June 14	"I'm Still a Guy"	Brad Paisley	
June 21	"Last Name"	Carrie Underwood	
June 28	"Better as a Memory"	Kenny Chesney	
July 5	"Better as a Memory"	Kenny Chesney	
July 12	"Back When I Knew It All"	Montgomery Gentry	
July 19	"Home"	Blake Shelton	
July 26	"Home"	Blake Shelton	
August 2	"Good Time"	Alan Jackson	
August 9	"Good Time"	Alan Jackson	
August 16	"All I Want to Do"	Sugarland	
August 23	"Should've Said No"	Taylor Swift	
August 30	"Should've Said No"	Taylor Swift	
September 6	"You Look Good in My Shirt"	Keith Urban	
September 13	"Do You Believe Me Now"	Jimmy Wayne	
September 20	"Waitin' on a Woman"	Brad Paisley	
September 27	"Do You Believe Me Now"	Jimmy Wayne	
October 4	"Don't Think I Don't Think About It"	Darius Rucker	
October 11	"Don't Think I Don't Think About It"	Darius Rucker	
October 18	"Everybody Wants to Go to Heaven"	Kenny Chesney with The Wailers (Note: The Wailers were only credited in the issue dated October 25.)	
October 25	"Everybody Wants to Go to Heaven"	Kenny Chesney with The Wailers	
November 1	"She Never Cried in Front of Me"	Toby Keith	
November 8	"Just a Dream"	Carrie Underwood	
November 15	"Just a Dream"	Carrie Underwood	
November 22	"Love Story"	Taylor Swift	
November 29	"Love Story"	Taylor Swift	
December 6	"Chicken Fried"	Zac Brown Band	
December 13	"Chicken Fried"	Zac Brown Band	
December 20	"Roll with Me"	Montgomery Gentry	
December 27	"Roll with Me"	Montgomery Gentry	

== See also ==
- 2008 in music
- List of artists who reached number one on the U.S. country chart
