= Love Story (Taylor Swift song) =

2008 single by Taylor Swift

Single by Taylor Swift

from the album Fearless
- Released: September 15, 2008
- Recorded: March 2008
- Studio: Blackbird (Nashville)
- Genre: Country pop
- Length: 3:55
- Label: Big Machine
- Songwriter: Taylor Swift
- Producers: Taylor Swift; Nathan Chapman

Taylor Swift singles chronology
"Should've Said No" (2008)	"Love Story" (2008)	"White Horse" (2008)

Music video
- "Love Story" on YouTube

"Love Story" is a song by the American singer-songwriter Taylor Swift. It was released as the lead single from her second studio album, Fearless, on September 15, 2008, by Big Machine Records. Inspired by a boy who was unpopular with her family and friends, Swift wrote the song using William Shakespeare's tragedy Romeo and Juliet as a reference point. The lyrics narrate a troubled romance that ends with a marriage proposal, contrary to Shakespeare's tragic conclusion. Produced by Swift and Nathan Chapman, the midtempo country pop song includes a key change after the bridge and uses acoustic instruments including banjo, fiddle, mandolin, and guitar.

At the time of the song's release, music critics praised the production but deemed the literary references ineffective. In retrospect, critics have considered it one of Swift's signature songs and career-defining singles. "Love Story" peaked atop the chart in Australia and reached the top five on charts in Canada, Ireland, Japan, New Zealand, and the United Kingdom. It has received multi-platinum certifications in Australia, Brazil, Canada, New Zealand, and the United Kingdom. In the United States, the single peaked at number four on the Billboard Hot 100 and was the first country song to reach number one on Pop Songs, and it has been certified eight-times platinum by the Recording Industry Association of America (RIAA). "Love Story" has sold over 18 million copies worldwide.

Trey Fanjoy directed the accompanying music video, which stars Swift and Justin Gaston as lovers in a prior era. Drawing from historical periods such as the Renaissance and the Regency era, it won Video of the Year at both the Country Music Association Awards and CMT Music Awards in 2009. The song became a staple in Swift's live concerts and has been a part of the set lists in all of her headlining tours from the Fearless Tour (2009–2010) to the Eras Tour (2023–2024). Following a 2019 dispute regarding the ownership of Swift's back catalog, she re-recorded the song and released it as "Love Story (Taylor's Version)" in February 2021. The track topped the Hot Country Songs chart and made Swift the second artist after Dolly Parton to top that chart with both the original and re-recorded versions of a song.

== Background and writing ==
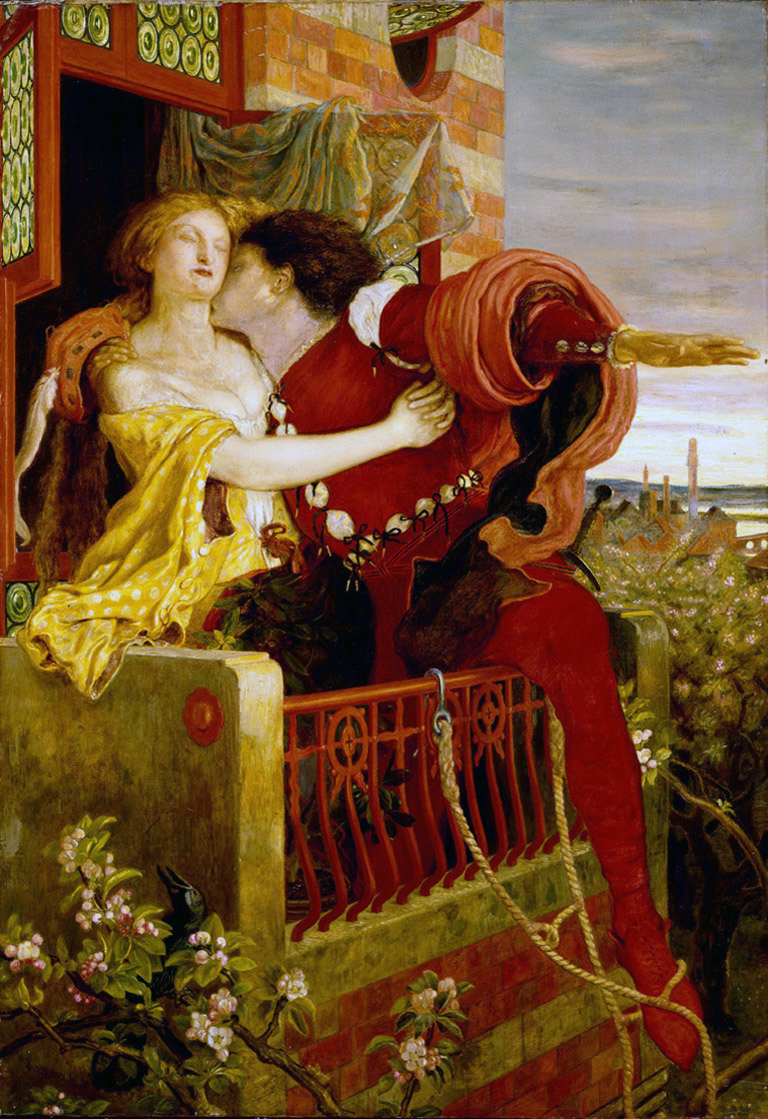
Swift used Shakespeare's Romeo and Juliet as a reference point for "Love Story"; the balcony scene (pictured) is referenced in the song's opening lines.

Taylor Swift moved from Pennsylvania to Nashville, Tennessee, in 2004 to pursue a career as a country singer-songwriter, and in 2006, she released her first album Taylor Swift at 16 years old. The album spent more weeks on the US Billboard 200 chart than any other album that was released in the 2000s decade. Taylor Swift's third single "Our Song" made Swift the youngest person to single-handedly write and sing a Hot Country Songs number-one single. Her success was rare for a female teenage artist; the 2000s country-music market had been dominated by adult male musicians.

While promoting her debut album on tour in 2007 and 2008, Swift wrote songs for her second studio album Fearless. She developed "Love Story" late into the production of Fearless. Answering fan questions on Time in April 2009, Swift said the song was inspired by a boy whom she never dated and was one of the most romantic pieces she had written. Swift recalled the reactions she received after introducing him to her family and friends: "[They] all said they didn't like him. All of them!" This made Swift relate to the narrative of William Shakespeare's 16th-century play Romeo and Juliet, which she described as a "situation where the only people who wanted them to be together were them". Reflecting on the event, Swift thought, "This is difficult but it's real, it matters"; she developed the second refrain and later the whole song around that line.

Although inspired by Romeo and Juliet, Swift felt the play could have been "the best love story ever told" had it not been for Shakespeare's tragic ending in which the two characters die. She thus made the narrative of "Love Story" conclude with a marriage proposal, which she deemed a happy ending the characters deserved. Swift wrote "Love Story" on her bedroom floor in approximately 20 minutes, feeling too inspired to put the song down unfinished. According to Swift, the song represents her optimistic outlook on love, which is inspired by her childhood fascination with fairy tales. Looking back on "Love Story" after she released her seventh studio album Lover (2019), which is about her first experience of "love that was very real", Swift said the track was inspired by what she would read about and see in movies "mixed in with [...] crush stuff that had happened in my life".

== Production and release ==
After finishing writing, Swift recorded a rough demo of "Love Story" within 15 minutes the next day. She recorded the song's album version in March 2008 with the producer Nathan Chapman at Blackbird Studio in Nashville. For her vocals, Chapman tried different microphones until Swift came across an Avantone CV-12 multi-pattern tube microphone that was built by the country-music artist Ray Kennedy, with whom she worked on Taylor Swift. After growing fond of the Avantone CV-12 upon testing her vocals, Swift used it to record "Love Story" and other songs. She sang the song live backed by her band, who were playing acoustic guitar, bass guitar, and drums. Chapman played other instruments, including nine acoustic guitars, and he overdubbed them on the track; he also recorded background vocals. The engineer Chad Carlson recorded the track using Pro Tools and Justin Niebank mixed it using a Solid State Logic 9080 K series console and Genelec 1032 studio monitors. Drew Bollman and Richard Edgeler assisted in the mixing process.

"Love Story", along with the rest of Fearless, was mastered by Hank Williams at MasterMix Studios in Nashville. The track uses country music instruments such as banjo and fiddle. Big Machine Records released it to US country radio as Fearless's lead single on September 15, 2008. Chapman mixed another version of "Love Story" for US pop radio; he edited Niebank's mix using Apple Logic, overlaid the original drums with an electronic drum loop via Apple Logic's Ultrabeat, and replaced the banjo and fiddle with an additional set of electric guitars recorded through Amplitube Stomp I/O. Rolling Stone's Keith Harris described the electric guitars as "suitably gargantuan" and louder than those on the country version. Big Machine in partnership with Republic Records released "Love Story" to US pop radio on October 14, 2008. In the United Kingdom, "Love Story" was released on March 2, 2009, a week prior to the release of the international edition of Fearless. Music Week reported that this version was "remixed for European ears".

== Music and lyrics ==
"Love Story"
A sample of the song's bridge and a key change to the final refrain, featuring the accelerated drums and harmonization of melody and vocals over acoustic strings

"Love Story" is a midtempo country pop song, with a tempo of 120 beats per minute and a 4/4 time, set in the key of D major. Its arrangement is driven by acoustic instruments including banjo, fiddle, mandolin, and guitar. Each refrain is accentuated by fiddle and layered electric guitar, drenched in reverb and delay effects. Jon Bream from the Star Tribune described the single as "pure pop with a minimalist vibe" that suits both country and pop radio. According to The New York Times, despite the banjo and fiddle, the song could "easily be an emo rocker". Swift's vocals have a slight twang. The mix and master, according to Billboard's Kristen He, are loud and "dynamically flat ... [and are] designed to burst out of FM radio speakers".

The lyrics of "Love Story" narrate a troubled romance between two characters, drawing from the lead characters in Shakespeare's Romeo and Juliet. According to the psychologist Katie Barclay, the song explores feelings of love in the contexts of pain and joy. "Love Story", save for the final refrain, is narrated from Juliet's perspective. In the verses, Juliet tells the story of hers and Romeo's challenged courtship, of which her father disapproves. The first verse introduces Juliet in a scene, "We were both young when I first saw you / I close my eyes and the flashback starts, I'm standing there / On a balcony in summer air", which references the balcony scene in Act II, scene ii of Shakespeare's play. In the refrains, which alter slightly as the song progresses to accompany the narrative, Juliet pleads for her love interest to appear, "Romeo, take me somewhere we can be alone / I'll be waiting / All there's left to do is run."

In the second verse, Juliet meets Romeo again in a garden and learns he must leave town because of her father's disapproval. Their relationship encounters difficulties, "'Cause you were Romeo, I was a scarlet letter", referencing Nathaniel Hawthorne's The Scarlet Letter (1850). According to the media-and-film scholar Iris H. Tuan, Hawthrone's "scarlet letter" imagery represents the female protagonist Hester Prynne's sin and adultery, whereas Swift's use symbolizes the forbidden love between Romeo and Juliet. Juliet pleads, "This love is difficult, but it's real", which Swift said was her favorite lyric in the song.

After the bridge, with accelerated drums and the harmonization of melody and vocals, the final refrain incorporates a key change up a whole step, from D major to E major. The final refrain is narrated from Romeo's perspective and tells of his marriage proposal to Juliet after he has sought her father's approval, "I talked to your dad, go pick out a white dress." Whereas Shakespeare's Romeo and Juliet are secretly married without their parents' approval and both commit suicide, the characters in "Love Story" depart from that ending. According to Tuan, by projecting her feelings and fantasy on a Romeo and Juliet-inspired narrative, Swift created a song that strongly resonates with an audience of teenage girls and young women. Deborah Evans Price of Billboard agreed but also said "one doesn't have to be a lovestruck teen" to enjoy the song's emotional engagement.

== Critical reception ==
Blender included "Love Story" at number 73 on its 2008 year-end list, and The Village Voice's Pazz & Jop critics' poll placed it at number 48. In Fearless reviews, many critics complimented the production; Sean Daly from the St. Petersburg Times, Rob Sheffield from Blender and Stephen Thomas Erlewine from AllMusic selected the track as an album highlight. Deborah Evans Price of Billboard praised the "swirling, dreamy" production and said Swift's success in the country-music market "could only gain momentum". Others including The Boston Globe's James Reed and USA Today's Elysa Gardner deemed "Love Story" an example of Swift's songwriting abilities at a young age; the latter appreciated the song for earnestly portraying teenage feelings "rather than [being] a mouthpiece for a bunch of older pros' collective notion of adolescent yearning".

Some critics were more reserved in their praise and took issue with the literary references. In a four-stars-out-of-five rating of the song for the BBC, Fraser McAlpine deemed the Shakespearean reference not as sophisticated as its premise and the lyrics generic, but he praised the production and wrote, "It's great to see a big pop song being used as a method of direct story telling." The musicologist James E. Perone commented: "the melodic hooks are strong enough to overcome the predictability of the lyrics." Jon Bream from the Star Tribune deemed the single inferior to Swift's debut country-music single "Tim McGraw" (2006) but commended the production as catchy. In a Slant Magazine review, Jonathan Keefe was impressed by Swift's melodic songwriting for creating "massive pop hooks" but found the references to Romeo and Juliet "point-missing" and The Scarlet Letter "inexplicable". Keefe deemed the lyrics lacking in creativity and disapproved of Swift's "clipped phrasing" in the refrain.

In retrospective commentaries, the English-language professor Robert N. Watson and the music journalist Annie Zaleski deemed "Love Story" a memorable song thanks to its Shakespearean narrative; the former regarded it as an evidence of Swift's status as "the twenty-first-century's most popular songwriter of failed love affairs" and the latter wrote that the song deserves to be "a love story for the ages". "Love Story" was included on best-of lists including Taste of Country's "Top 100 Country Songs" (2016), Time Out's "35 Best Country Songs of All Time" (2022), and Billboard's "Top 50 Country Love Songs of All Time" (2022).

Critics have rated "Love Story" high in rankings of Swift's songs; these include Hannah Mylrea from NME (2020), who ranked it fifth out of 160 songs, Jane Song from Paste (2020), 13th out of 158, and Nate Jones from Vulture (2024), 11th out of 245. In another ranking of Swift's select 100 tracks for The Independent, Roisin O'Connor placed "Love Story" at number 15 and said it showcases Swift as a songwriter who "understands the power of a forbidden romance". Alexis Petridis from The Guardian placed it second, behind "Blank Space" (2014), on his 2019 ranking of Swift's 44 singles. He said of the literary allusions: "[If] the references to Shakespeare and Hawthorn [sic] seem clumsy, they are clumsy in a believably teenage way."

== Commercial performance ==
In the United States, "Love Story" debuted at number 16 on the Billboard Hot 100 and at number 25 on the Hot Country Songs chart, both dated September 27, 2008. The next week, it reached number five on the Hot 100. The single peaked at number four on the Hot 100 chart dated January 17, 2009, and spent 49 weeks on the chart. It spent two weeks atop the Hot Country Songs chart. On the Pop Songs chart, which tracks US pop radio, "Love Story" reached number one on the week ending February 28, 2009. It became the first song to top both the country-radio and pop-radio charts and surpassed the number-three-peaking "You're Still the One" (1998) by Shania Twain as the highest-charting country crossover to pop radio.

On other Billboard airplay charts, "Love Story" peaked at number one on Adult Contemporary and number three on Adult Pop Songs. Together with "Teardrops on My Guitar" (2007), "Love Story" made Swift the first artist in the 2000s decade to have two titles each reach the top 10 of four airplay charts; Hot Country Songs, Pop Songs, Adult Pop Songs, and Adult Contemporary. It topped the 2009 year-end Radio Songs chart. By February 2009, it was the first country song to sell three million downloads. In 2015, the Recording Industry Association of America (RIAA) certified "Love Story" eight-times platinum. The single had sold 6.2 million copies in the United States by October 2022 and became Swift's highest-selling single in the nation.

"Love Story" was Swift's first number-one single in Australia, where it was certified fifteen-times platinum by the Australian Recording Industry Association (ARIA). It peaked within the top five of singles charts in Japan (three), and in the countries of the English-speaking world: the United Kingdom (two), Ireland (three), New Zealand (three), and Canada (four). In continental Europe, the single peaked at number ten on the European Hot 100 Singles chart, number four in the Czech Republic, number six in Hungary, number seven in Norway, and number ten in Sweden. "Love Story" was certified four-times platinum in the United Kingdom and New Zealand, double platinum in Canada, and platinum in Denmark and Germany. It sold 6.5 million digital copies worldwide and was the sixth-most-downloaded single of 2009. By February 2021, estimated worldwide sales of "Love Story" stood at 18 million units.

== Music video ==
=== Development and filming ===
Trey Fanjoy, who had worked with Swift on previous music videos, directed "Love Story". Swift was inspired by historical eras such as the Middle Ages, the Renaissance, and the Regency to make a period-piece-styled video with a timeless narrative that "could happen in the 1700s, 1800s, or 2008". She spent six months searching for the male lead and upon recommendation from an acquaintance chose Justin Gaston, a fashion model who was competing in the television series Nashville Star. After Gaston was eliminated from the show, Swift contacted him to appear in the video. She believed Gaston was a perfect choice for the male lead: "I was so impressed by the way his [expressions] were in the video. Without even saying anything, he would just do a certain glance and it really came across well."

The music video was filmed within two days in August 2008 in Tennessee. The crew considered traveling to Europe to find a castle for the video's setting but settled on Castle Gwynn in Arrington; the castle was built in 1973 and is part of the annual Tennessee Renaissance Festival. Wardrobe for the video—except Swift's dress for the balcony scene, which was designed by Sandi Spika with inspiration and suggestions from Swift—was supplied by Jacquard Fabrics. On the first day, the balcony and field scenes were filmed. The second day's filming included the ballroom scene was filmed with 20 dancers from Cumberland University in Lebanon; Swift learned the choreography 15 minutes prior to filming. She invited some fans who were university students from other states to fly to Nashville and film the video with her. "Love Story" premiered on September 12, 2008, on CMT. Behind-the-scenes footage of the music video's production was aired on Great American Country on November 12, 2008.

=== Synopsis and commentary ===
The video starts with Swift wearing a black sweater and jeans; she walks through a college campus and sees Gaston reading under a tree. As they make eye contact, the video transitions to a balcony, on which Swift is wearing a corset and gown. The video switches to a ballroom where Gaston and Swift dance together, after which Gaston whispers into Swift's ear. Swift is next shown walking into a garden with a lantern at night. She meets with Gaston and they have a date before parting ways. Later, Swift again stands on the balcony looking out from the window. She sees Gaston running across a field towards her and she immediately runs down the staircase to meet him. The video then switches back to the modern-day college campus, where Gaston walks toward Swift and they gaze into each other's eyes, and the video ends.

Spin wrote that the video appears to have been filmed on an "HBO-looking budget" with "elaborate, pseudo-medieval set pieces"; according to the magazine, rather than alluding to Shakespeare's Romeo and Juliet, the narrative resembles "Rapunzel", especially the part in which Swift's character waits for her lover atop a castle. According to Glamour, Swift's fashion in the video reinforces the lyrical theme, "[She] literally wore a medieval ball gown while playing the Juliet to an actor's Romeo." In a 2010 Billboard interview, Swift reflected on the video's fairy-tale-inspired wedding setting: "I'm not really that girl who dreams about her wedding day. It just seems like the idealistic, happy-ever-after [moment]."

== Awards and nominations ==
"Love Story" won Song of the Year at the Country Awards in 2009 and Pop Awards in 2010, both of which were held by Broadcast Music, Inc. (BMI) to honor the year's most-performed songs on US radio and television. It marked Swift's second consecutive Song of the Year win at the BMI Country Awards, following "Teardrops on My Guitar" in 2008. Swift, who was 20, was the youngest songwriter to win Song of the Year at the BMI Pop Awards. At the Australian APRA Awards, "Love Story" was nominated for International Work of the Year.

It received nominations at the People's Choice Awards (Favorite Country Song, which went to Carrie Underwood's "Last Name"), Nickelodeon Australian Kids' Choice Awards (Favorite Song, which went to the Black Eyed Peas' "Boom Boom Pow"), and Teen Choice Awards (Choice Love Song, which went to David Archuleta's "Crush"). The music video was nominated for Video of the Year at the 45th Academy of Country Music Awards, but it lost to Brad Paisley's "Waitin' on a Woman" (2008). At the 2009 CMT Music Awards, it won Video of the Year and Female Video of the Year. It also won Music Video of the Year at the 43rd Country Music Association Awards and Favorite International Video at the Philippine Myx Music Awards 2010.

== Live performances and other uses ==
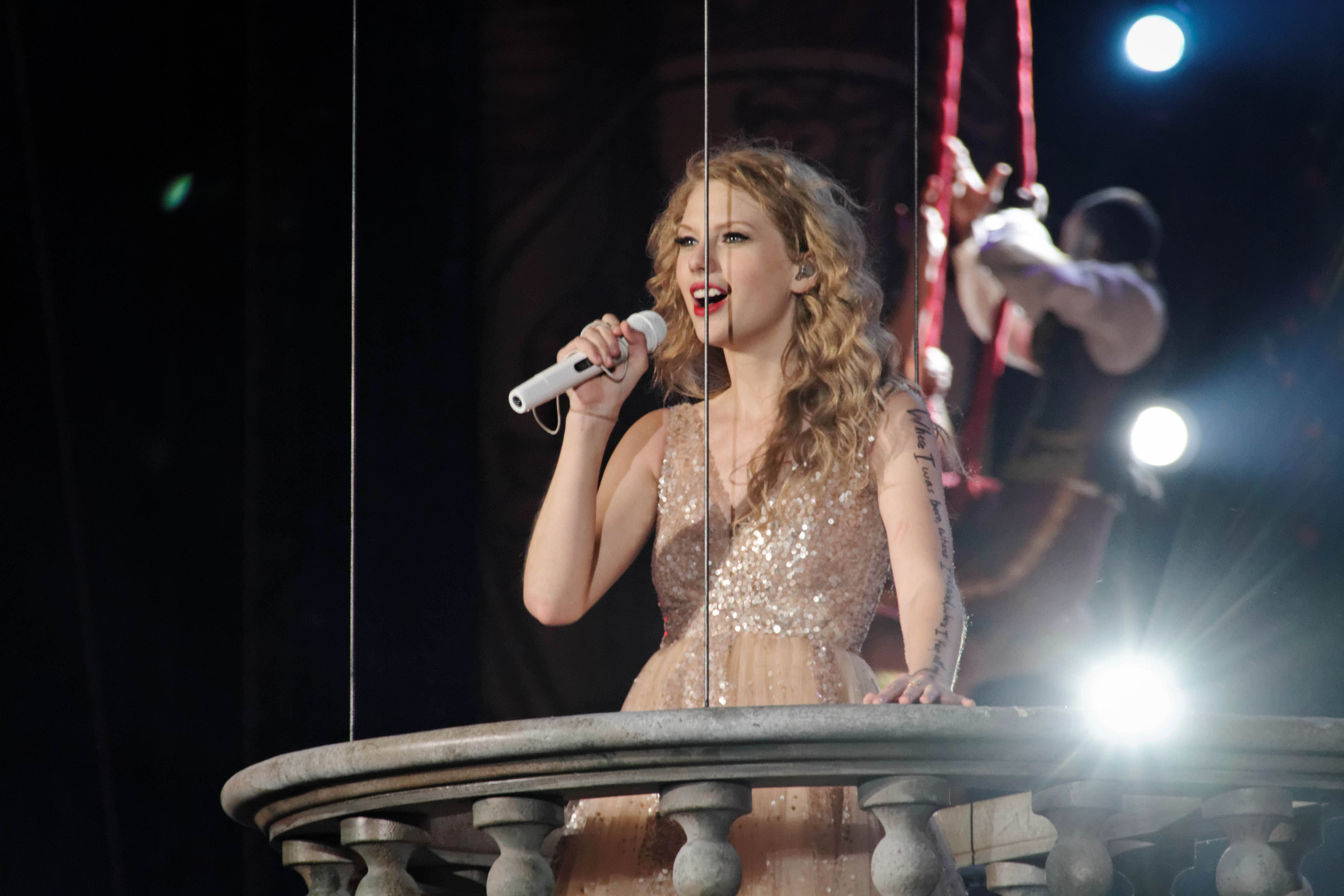
Swift performing "Love Story" on a flying balcony at the Speak Now World Tour in 2011

"Love Story" has become a staple in Swift's concerts—as of July 2023, she had performed the song live over 500 times, more than any other song in her discography. The song became a number in Swift's shows during which many couples get engaged, specifically after the bridge that has lyrics about Romeo proposing to Juliet.

During promotion of Fearless in 2008 and 2009, Swift performed "Love Story" on television shows including Good Morning America, Late Show with David Letterman, The Today Show, Dancing with the Stars, The Ellen DeGeneres Show, and Saturday Night Live. At the 2008 Country Music Association Awards, she re-enacted the music video for "Love Story", performing the song on a ballroom stage-setting with Gaston playing the love interest. Swift and the English band Def Leppard performed "Love Story", among other tracks from each artist's repertoire, for a CMT Crossroads episode that was recorded in October 2008; the performance was released on DVD in 2009. In the United Kingdom, Swift sang "Love Story" on the BBC charity telethon Children in Need, to which she donated £13,000 afterward.

"Love Story" was part of the set lists for many of Swift's 2009 headline festival performances, including Houston Livestock Show and Rodeo, Florida Strawberry Festival, Sound Relief, the CMA Music Festival, and Craven Country Jamboree. She included the song in the set list of her first headlining concert tour the Fearless Tour (2009–2010). The song's performances began with backup dancers dressed in Victorian clothing, dancing to Pachelbel's Canon as a castle backdrop was projected onto the stage. Swift emerged from below to an upper level of the stage; she wore an 18th-century-styled crimson gown with golden accents. For the final refrain, Swift hid behind backup dancers as she changed into a white wedding dress and a jeweled headband. The live performances of "Love Story" were recorded and released on the DVD Journey to Fearless in 2011.

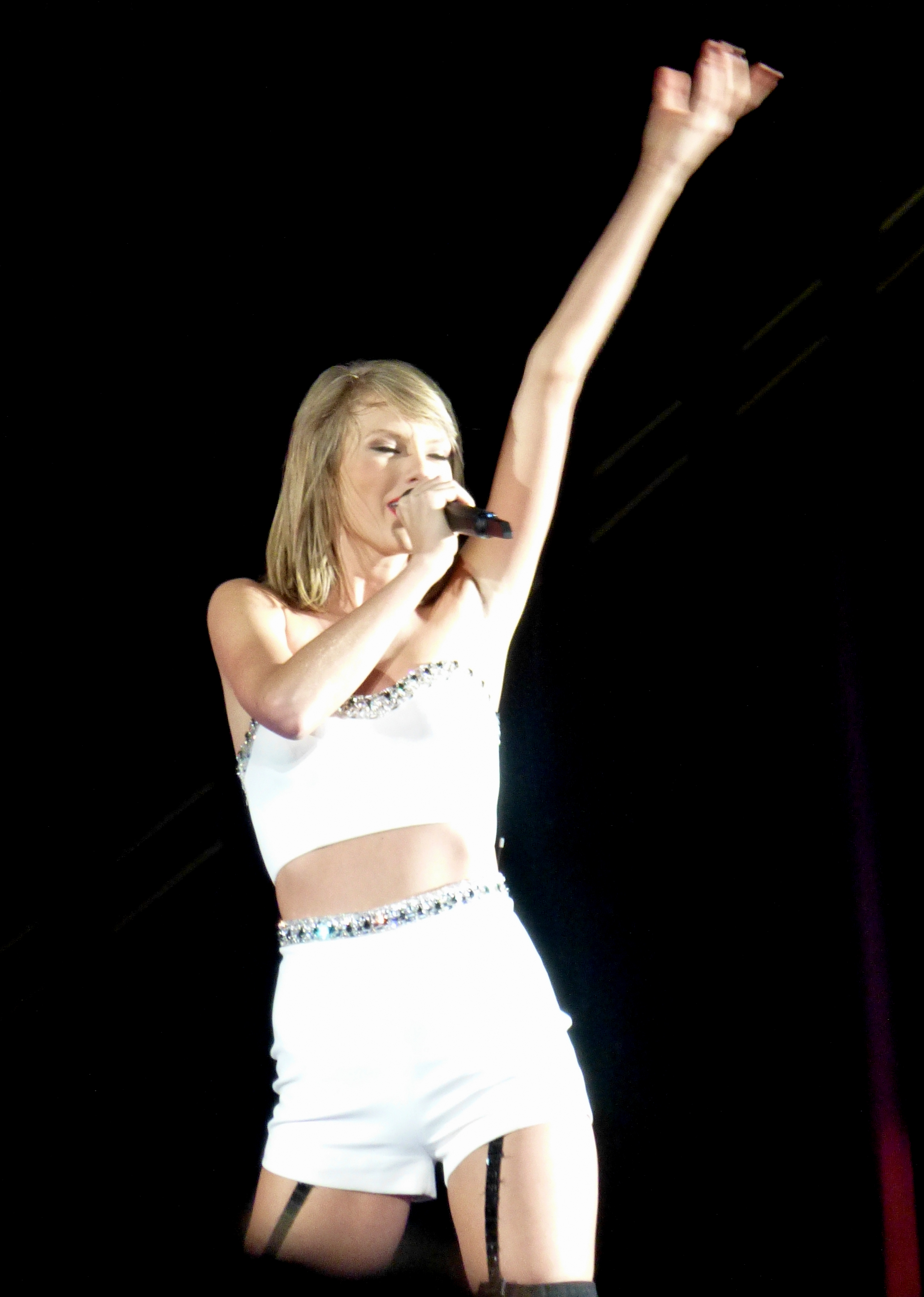
Swift singing a synth-pop version of "Love Story" on the 1989 World Tour in 2015

"Love Story" was the final song on the set list of Swift's second headlining tour, the Speak Now World Tour (2011–2012). Swift wore a white sundress and sang the song while roaming across the stage on a flying balcony as confetti rained down and fireworks exploded on stage. The song was part of Swift's performance at BBC Radio 1's Teen Awards in October 2012; she appeared in a white dress before changing into silver hot pants and a sheer black top. Swift sang the song later the same month as part of a VH1 Storytellers episode that was recorded at Harvey Mudd College in California. On January 25, 2013, Swift performed an acoustic version of "Love Story" at the Los Premios 40 Principales in Spain. She again included the song in the set list of her third headlining tour the Red Tour (2013–2014), in which she sang it while wearing a white gown.

At the 2014 iHeartRadio Music Awards, Swift performed an arena rock version of "Love Story". During concerts of her fourth headlining tour the 1989 World Tour (2015), she rearranged the song as a synth-pop ballad and sang it while standing on an elevated platform that whisked around the venue. Commenting on the 1989 World Tour rearrangement, Jane Song from Paste said "Love Story" "will continue to be one of [Swift's] calling cards". Swift again included "Love Story" in the set list of her fifth concert tour, 2018's Reputation Stadium Tour, in which she performed it as part of a medley with her singles "Style" and "You Belong with Me".

On April 23, 2019, she performed a piano rendition of "Love Story" at Lincoln Center for the Performing Arts during the Time 100 Gala, in which she was honored as one of the year's "most influential people". On September 9, Swift performed the song at the City of Lover one-off concert in Paris. At the American Music Awards of 2019, at which she was awarded "Artist of the Decade", Swift performed "Love Story" as part of a medley with "The Man", "I Knew You Were Trouble", "Blank Space", and "Shake It Off". On July 21, 2022, at a concert of Haim's One More Haim Tour in London, Swift made a guest appearance and performed "Love Story" as part of a mashup with "Gasoline". She again included "Love Story" in the regular set list of her sixth headlining concert tour, the Eras Tour (2023–2024). On October 17, 2026, Swift performed "Love Story" as part of a four-song closing set at the Academy Museum Gala, an annual fundraiser for the Academy Museum of Motion Pictures.

"Love Story" has been parodied and adapted into popular-culture events. For the 2009 CMT Music Awards, Swift and the rapper T-Pain recorded a parody titled "Thug Story", in which they rap and sing with Auto-Tune; the parody aired as part of the awards ceremony's cold open. In August 2020, an unofficial house remix of "Love Story" by the American DJ Disco Lines went viral on the video-sharing platform TikTok. The Disco Lines remix charted at number 37 on Poland's airplay chart in October 2020. Following the cancellation of Swift's three Eras Tour shows at Ernst-Happel-Stadion in Vienna due to a terror plot, the British rock band Coldplay and the American singer Maggie Rogers covered "Love Story" on the Music of the Spheres World Tour at the same venues weeks later as a tribute.

== Personnel ==
Credits adapted from the liner notes of the CD single

Musicians

- Taylor Swift – lead vocals, songwriter, backing vocals
- Nathan Chapman – backing vocals, acoustic guitar, banjo, drums, bass, electric guitar, mandolin, keyboards
- Nick Buda – drums
- John Keefe – drums
- Eric Darken – percussion
- Rob Hajacos – fiddle
- Tony Harrell – keyboards
- Tim Lauer – keyboards
- llya Toshinsky – banjo
- Tim Marks – bass
- Amos Heller – bass
- Bryan Sutton – acoustic guitar, mandolin
- Kenny Greenberg – electric guitar
- Grant Mickelson – electric guitar
- Tim Van der Kull – additional guitar
- Caitlin Evanson – backing vocals
- Al Wilson – percussion

Technical

- Taylor Swift – producer
- Nathan Chapman – producer, programming
- Justin Niebank – mixing
- Drew Bollman – assistant mixing
- Chad Carslon – recording engineer
- Richard Edgeler – assistant recording engineer, assistant mixing
- Jeremy "Jim Bob" Wheatley – additional recording engineer, additional mixing
- Hank Williams – mastering

== Charts ==
=== Weekly charts ===
Weekly chart performance
Chart (2008–09)	Peak position
Australia (ARIA)	1
Austria (Ö3 Austria Top 40)	30
Belgium (Ultratip Bubbling Under Flanders)	4
Belgium (Ultratop 50 Wallonia)	39
Canada Hot 100 (Billboard)	4
Canada AC (Billboard)	1
Canada CHR/Top 40 (Billboard)	4
Canada Country (Billboard)	1
Canada Hot AC (Billboard)	3
CIS Airplay (TopHit)	180
Czech Republic (Rádio Top 100 Oficiální)	4
Denmark (Tracklisten)	16
Denmark Airplay (Tracklisten)	6
European Hot 100 Singles (Billboard)	10
Euro Digital Song Sales (Billboard)	5
Finland Download (Latauslista)	17
France (SNEP)	14
Germany (GfK)	22
Hungary (Single Top 40)	6
Ireland (IRMA)	3
Japan (Japan Hot 100)	3
Japan Adult Contemporary (Billboard)	1
Mexico Ingles Airplay (Billboard)	6
Netherlands (Single Top 100)	13
New Zealand (Recorded Music NZ)	3
Norway (VG-lista)	7
Scottish Singles Sales (Official Charts)	5
Slovakia Airplay (ČNS IFPI)	13
Spain (Promusicae)	47
Sweden (Sverigetopplistan)	10
Switzerland (Schweizer Hitparade)	50
UK Singles (Official Charts)	2
US Billboard Hot 100	4
US Adult Contemporary (Billboard)	1
US Adult Pop Airplay (Billboard)	3
US Hot Country Songs (Billboard)	1
US Latin Pop Airplay (Billboard)	35
US Pop Airplay (Billboard)	1
US Pop 100 (Billboard)	3

Chart (2024)	Peak position
Malaysia International (RIM)	12
Portugal (AFP)	77
Singapore (RIAS)	2

=== Year-end charts ===
Year-end chart performance
Chart (2008)	Position
US Billboard Hot 100	81
US Hot Country Songs (Billboard)	55

Chart (2009)	Position
Australia (ARIA)	3
Canada (Canadian Hot 100)	8
European Hot 100 Singles (Billboard)	94
France (SNEP)	94
Japan (Japan Hot 100)	54
Japan Adult Contemporary (Billboard)	13
New Zealand (RMNZ)	13
Sweden (Sverigetopplistan)	47
Taiwan (Hito Radio)	6
UK Singles (OCC)	29
US Billboard Hot 100	5
US Adult Contemporary (Billboard)	2
US Adult Pop Songs (Billboard)	11
US Pop Songs (Billboard)	8

=== Decade-end charts ===
Decade-end chart performance
Chart (2000–09)	Position
Australia (ARIA)	10
US Billboard Hot 100	73

== Certifications ==
Certifications
Region	Certification	Certified units/sales
Australia (ARIA)	15× Platinum	1,050,000^{‡}
Austria (IFPI Austria)	Platinum	30,000^{*}
Brazil (Pro-Música Brasil)	2× Platinum	120,000^{‡}
Canada (Music Canada)	2× Platinum	160,000^{*}
Denmark (IFPI Danmark)	Platinum	90,000^{‡}
France (SNEP)	Gold	100,000^{‡}
Germany (BVMI)	Platinum	300,000^{‡}
Italy (FIMI)	Gold	50,000^{‡}
Japan (RIAJ)	Gold	100,000^{*}
New Zealand (RMNZ)	4× Platinum	120,000^{‡}
Spain (Promusicae)	Gold	30,000^{‡}
United Kingdom (BPI)	4× Platinum	2,400,000^{‡}
United States (RIAA)	8× Platinum	8,000,000^{‡}
United States (RIAA) Mastertone	Platinum	1,000,000^{*}
^{*} Sales figures based on certification alone.^{‡} Sales+streaming figures based on certification alone.

== Release history ==
List of release dates and formats
Region	Release date	Format	Version	Label	Ref.
United States	September 15, 2008	Country radio	Original	Big Machine	
United States	October 14, 2008	Contemporary hit radio	Original	Big Machine; Republic	
Various	January 6, 2009	Digital download	Pop Mix	Big Machine	
Various	February 6, 2009	Digital download	Stripped	Big Machine	
Various	February 27, 2009	Digital download	Digital Dog Radio Mix	Big Machine	
United Kingdom	March 2, 2009	Digital download	Original	Mercury; Universal Music	
Germany	April 24, 2009	CD single	Original	Universal Music	

== "Love Story (Taylor's Version)" ==
"Love Story (Taylor's Version)"

Promotional single by Taylor Swift

from the album Fearless (Taylor's Version)
- Released: February 12, 2021
- Studio: Blackbird (Nashville)
- Length: 3:56
- Label: Republic
- Songwriter: Taylor Swift
- Producers: Taylor Swift; Christopher Rowe

Lyric video
- "Love Story" (Taylor's Version) on YouTube

After signing a new contract with Republic Records, Swift began re-recording her first six studio albums, including Fearless, in November 2020. The decision came after a 2019 public dispute between Swift and the talent manager Scooter Braun, who acquired Big Machine Records, including the masters of Swift's albums the label had released. By re-recording her catalog, Swift had full ownership of the new masters, including the copyright licensing of her songs, devaluing the Big Machine-owned masters.

Swift re-recorded "Love Story" and titled it "Love Story (Taylor's Version)". An excerpt of the re-recording was used in a Match.com advertisement in December 2020. "Love Story (Taylor's Version)" was the first re-recorded track she released; it was made available for download and streaming on February 12, 2021, preceding the release of the re-recorded album Fearless (Taylor's Version) in April. An EDM version of "Love Story (Taylor's Version)" remixed by the Swedish producer Elvira was released on March 26, 2021, and was included on the deluxe edition of Fearless (Taylor's Version).

=== Production ===
"Love Story (Taylor's Version)" was produced by Swift and the Nashville-based producer Christopher Rowe. It was recorded by David Payne at Blackbird Studio, with additional recording by Rowe at Prime Recording and Studio 13, all of which are in Nashville. Sam Holland recorded Swift's vocals at Conway Recording Studios in Los Angeles; Serban Ghenea mixed the re-recording at MixStar Studios in Virginia Beach, Virginia; and Randy Merrill mastered it at Sterling Sound in Edgewater, New Jersey. Swift invited some of the musicians who worked on the 2008 version to re-record with her; these participants include Jonathan Yudkin on fiddle, Amos Heller on bass guitar, and Caitlin Evanson on harmony vocals; they were part of Swift's touring band and had played "Love Story" with her many times.

According to critics, the production of "Love Story (Taylor's Version)" is faithful to that of the 2008 version. They noticed changes in the timbre of Swift's vocals, which have a fuller tone and an absence of the country-music twang; The Atlantic's Shirley Li found Swift's voice "much richer" with a controlled tone and precise staccato. Swift said re-recording "Love Story" made her realize how she had improved as a singer and how her "voice was so teenaged" in the old recordings.

The re-recording's instruments are sharper and more distinct, with clearer sounds of the banjo, cymbals, and fiddle; stronger drums; a more-clearly defined bass; less-harsh electric guitars; and lowered harmonies in the mix. In Billboard, Kristen He said whereas the instruments on the 2008 version blended into a "wall of sound", the production of "Love Story (Taylor's Version)" highlighted individual instruments.

=== Reception ===
In reviews, critics praised "Love Story (Taylor's Version)" for being faithful to the original version and felt it was improved upon with polished production and Swift's mature vocals. A few welcomed the re-recording as Swift's display of ownership of her music. Reviews from Rolling Stone's Simon Vozick-Levinson and Los Angeles Times's Mikael Wood dubbed the re-recording an update of a "classic" song about teenage sentiments. Mark Savage from BBC News said Swift's improved vocals retain the teenage feelings, but The Atlantic's Shirley Li and NME's Hannah Mylrea said they were more powerful, which introduces a sense of wistfulness and therefore loses the earnestness of the 2008 version. According to Robert Christgau, "Swift's voice retains a great deal of freshness" but he questioned the value of re-recordings in general, adding that he could not see himself buying them.

In the United States, "Love Story (Taylor's Version)" debuted atop the Hot Country Songs chart, giving Swift her eighth number-one single and first number-one debut. With this achievement, she became the first artist to lead the chart in the 2000s, 2010s, and 2020s, and the second artist to have a number one with both the original and re-recorded version of a song, after Dolly Parton with "I Will Always Love You". On other Billboard charts, "Love Story (Taylor's Version)" topped Digital Song Sales (Swift's record-extending 22nd number one), Country Digital Song Sales (record-extending 15th number one), and Country Streaming Songs. The song debuted and peaked at number 11 on the Billboard Hot 100, her record-extending 129th chart entry; the most for a female artist. The re-recording peaked at number seven on the Billboard Global 200. It topped the singles chart in Malaysia and reached the top 10 in Canada, Ireland, and Singapore. It also charted at number 12 in the United Kingdom, where it was certified gold, and number 18 in New Zealand.

In October 2021, Billboard reported radio stations in the United States played "Love Story (Taylor's Version)" and other re-recordings infrequently compared to the originals; reasons given were that the re-recordings were insufficiently distinctive, that they had less audience demand for Swift's older songs than her newer ones, and they were difficult to categorize in radio format terms, as well as there being no financial incentive from Swift to promote the re-recordings to radio as radio stations do not have to pay the owners of the master recording every time they play a song and Swift would still receive songwriting royalties no matter what version was played. At the 2022 CMT Music Awards, the re-recording won the inaugural Trending Comeback Song of the Year; CMT created the category to honor "iconic stars and their hits that not only stood the test of time but also recently found new popularity".

=== Credits and personnel ===
Credits adapted from the liner notes of Fearless (Taylor's Version)

- Taylor Swift – lead vocals, songwriting, production
- Christopher Rowe – production, record engineering
- David Payne – record engineering
- John Hanes – engineering
- Randy Merrill – master engineering
- Serban Ghenea – mixing
- Sam Holland – vocal engineering
- Sean Badum – assistant recording engineering
- Mike Meadows – backing vocals, acoustic guitar, banjo, mandolin
- Paul Sidoti – backing vocals, electric guitar
- Caitlin Evanson – backing vocals
- Amos Heller – bass
- Matt Billingslea – drums
- Max Bernstein – electric guitar
- Jonathan Yudkin – fiddle

=== Charts ===
==== Weekly charts ====
Weekly chart performance
Chart (2021–2022)	Peak position
Australia (ARIA)	21
Belgium (Ultratip Bubbling Under Flanders)	24
Canada (Canadian Hot 100)	7
Canada AC (Billboard)	23
Euro Digital Song Sales (Billboard)	10
Finland Airplay (Radiosoittolista)	59
Global 200 (Billboard)	7
Ireland (IRMA)	7
Latvia (EHR)	2
Malaysia (RIM)	1
Netherlands (Single Tip)	6
New Zealand (Recorded Music NZ)	18
Portugal (AFP)	68
Singapore (RIAS)	3
Sweden (Sverigetopplistan)	62
UK Singles (Official Charts)	12
US Billboard Hot 100	11
US Adult Contemporary (Billboard)	25
US Adult Top 40 (Billboard)	39
US Country Airplay (Billboard)	57
US Hot Country Songs (Billboard)	1
US Rolling Stone Top 100	4

==== Year-end charts ====
Year-end chart performance
Chart (2021)	Position
US Hot Country Songs (Billboard)	80

=== Certifications ===
Certifications for Taylor's version
Region	Certification	Certified units/sales
Australia (ARIA)	4× Platinum	280,000^{‡}
Brazil (Pro-Música Brasil)	2× Platinum	80,000^{‡}
France (SNEP)	Gold	100,000^{‡}
New Zealand (RMNZ)	2× Platinum	60,000^{‡}
Poland (ZPAV)	Gold	25,000^{‡}
Spain (Promusicae)	Gold	30,000^{‡}
United Kingdom (BPI)	Platinum	600,000^{‡}
^{‡} Sales+streaming figures based on certification alone.

=== Release history ===
List of release dates and formats
Region	Date	Format	Version	Label	Ref.
Various	February 12, 2021	Digital download; streaming	Original	Republic	
Various	March 26, 2021	Digital download; streaming	Elvira remix	Republic	

== See also ==
- List of best-selling singles
- List of best-selling singles in Australia
- List of best-selling singles in the United Kingdom
- List of best-selling singles in the United States
- List of number-one singles of 2009 (Australia)
- List of Billboard Adult Contemporary number ones of 2009
- List of Hot Country Songs number ones of 2008
- List of Billboard Mainstream Top 40 number-one songs of 2009
- List of top 10 singles in 2021 (Ireland)
- List of Billboard number-one country songs of 2021
