= List of number-one country singles of 2007 (Canada) =

Canada Country was a chart published weekly by Billboard magazine.

This 50-position chart lists the most popular country music songs, calculated weekly by airplay on 31 country music stations across the country as monitored by Nielsen BDS. Songs are ranked by total plays. As with most other Billboard charts, the Canada Country chart features a rule for when a song enters recurrent rotation. A song is declared recurrent if it has been on the chart longer than 30 weeks and is lower than number 20 in rank.

These are the Canadian number-one country singles of 2007, per the BDS Canada Country Airplay chart.

Note that Billboard publishes charts with an issue date approximately 7–10 days in advance.

Issue date	Country Song	Artist	Ref.
January 6	"It Just Comes Natural"	George Strait	
January 13	"It Just Comes Natural"	George Strait	
January 20	"She's Everything"	Brad Paisley	
January 27	"It Just Comes Natural"	George Strait	
February 3	"It Just Comes Natural"	George Strait	
February 10	"It Just Comes Natural"	George Strait	
February 17	"Stupid Boy"	Keith Urban	
February 24	"Stupid Boy"	Keith Urban	
March 3	"Beer in Mexico"	Kenny Chesney	
March 10	"Last Dollar (Fly Away)"	Tim McGraw	
March 17	"Last Dollar (Fly Away)"	Tim McGraw	
March 24	"Last Dollar (Fly Away)"	Tim McGraw	
March 31	"Beer in Mexico"	Kenny Chesney	
April 7	"Beer in Mexico"	Kenny Chesney	
April 14	"Last Dollar (Fly Away)"	Tim McGraw	
April 21	"Wasted"	Carrie Underwood	
April 28	"Wasted"	Carrie Underwood	
May 5	"Settlin'"	Sugarland	
May 12	"Settlin'"	Sugarland	
May 19	"High Maintenance Woman"	Toby Keith	
May 26	"Ticks"	Brad Paisley	
June 2	"Ticks"	Brad Paisley	
June 9	"Ticks"	Brad Paisley	
June 16	"Ticks"	Brad Paisley	
June 23	"Ticks"	Brad Paisley	
June 30	"Wrapped"	George Strait	
July 7	"I Told You So"	Keith Urban	
July 14	"I Told You So"	Keith Urban	
July 21	"Cheaper to Keep Her"	Aaron Lines	
July 28	"I Told You So"	Keith Urban	
August 4	"Because of You"	Reba McEntire with Kelly Clarkson	
August 11	"Never Wanted Nothing More"	Kenny Chesney	
August 18	"Never Wanted Nothing More"	Kenny Chesney	
August 25	"Never Wanted Nothing More"	Kenny Chesney	
September 1	"Because of You"	Reba McEntire with Kelly Clarkson	
September 8	"Never Wanted Nothing More"	Kenny Chesney	
September 15	"Proud of the House We Built"	Brooks & Dunn	
September 22	"Online"	Brad Paisley	
September 29	"Online"	Brad Paisley	
October 6	"Online"	Brad Paisley	
October 13	"Online"	Brad Paisley	
October 20	"Online"	Brad Paisley	
October 27	"Don't Blink"	Kenny Chesney	
November 3	"Don't Blink"	Kenny Chesney	
November 10	"Don't Blink"	Kenny Chesney	
November 17	"Don't Blink"	Kenny Chesney	
November 24	"Don't Blink"	Kenny Chesney	
December 1	"Don't Blink"	Kenny Chesney	
December 8	"Don't Blink"	Kenny Chesney	
December 15	"More Than a Memory"	Garth Brooks	
December 22	"Our Song"	Taylor Swift	
December 29	"Our Song"	Taylor Swift	

== See also ==
- 2007 in music
- List of number-one country singles of 2007 (U.S.)
