= List of Hot Country Songs number ones of 2007 =

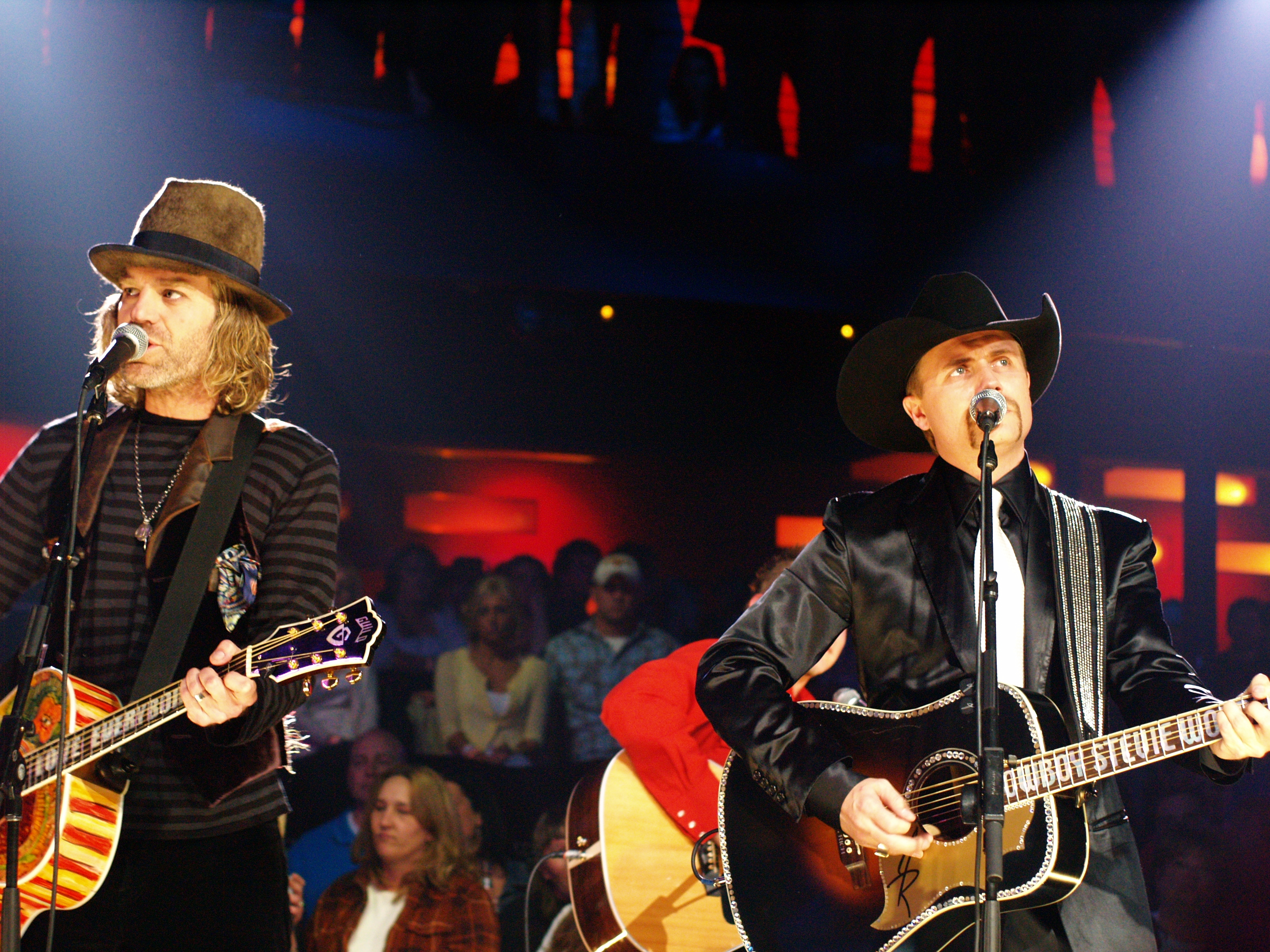
Big & Rich topped the chart for the first time in 2007.

Hot Country Songs is a chart that ranks the top-performing country music songs in the United States, published by Billboard magazine. In 2007, 25 different songs topped the chart in 52 issues of the magazine, based on weekly airplay data from country music radio stations compiled by Nielsen Broadcast Data Systems.

In the first issue of the new year, Brad Paisley reached number one with "She's Everything", replacing "Want To" by Sugarland, which had been number one in the issue dated December 30, 2006. This was the first of three number ones for Paisley in 2007, a feat only matched by Kenny Chesney. Paisley, however, spent significantly less time at number one in 2007, occupying the top spot for five weeks compared to Chesney's twelve. Chesney's song "Never Wanted Nothing More" was the longest-running number one of the year, with five weeks at the top. Acts who achieved their first number ones in 2007 included Canadian band Emerson Drive, whose song "Moments", which topped the chart in June, was the first ever Hot Country Songs number one by a band from Canada. Big & Rich also reached number one for the first and only time, topping the chart with "Lost in This Moment" in July.

In September, Garth Brooks made history when "More Than a Memory", the first single from his boxed set The Ultimate Hits, became the first song in the 63-year history of Billboard's country music charts to enter at number one. Another record was set in June when Tracy Lawrence topped the chart with his song "Find Out Who Your Friends Are", his first number one in eleven years. Reaching number one in its 41st week on the chart, the song set a new record for the slowest climb to the top of the Hot Country Songs chart. The final number one of the year was Taylor Swift's "Our Song", which also achieved a chart milestone. With the song, which she had originally written for a high school talent show, 18-year old Swift became the youngest sole writer and singer of a number one country song.

== Chart history ==
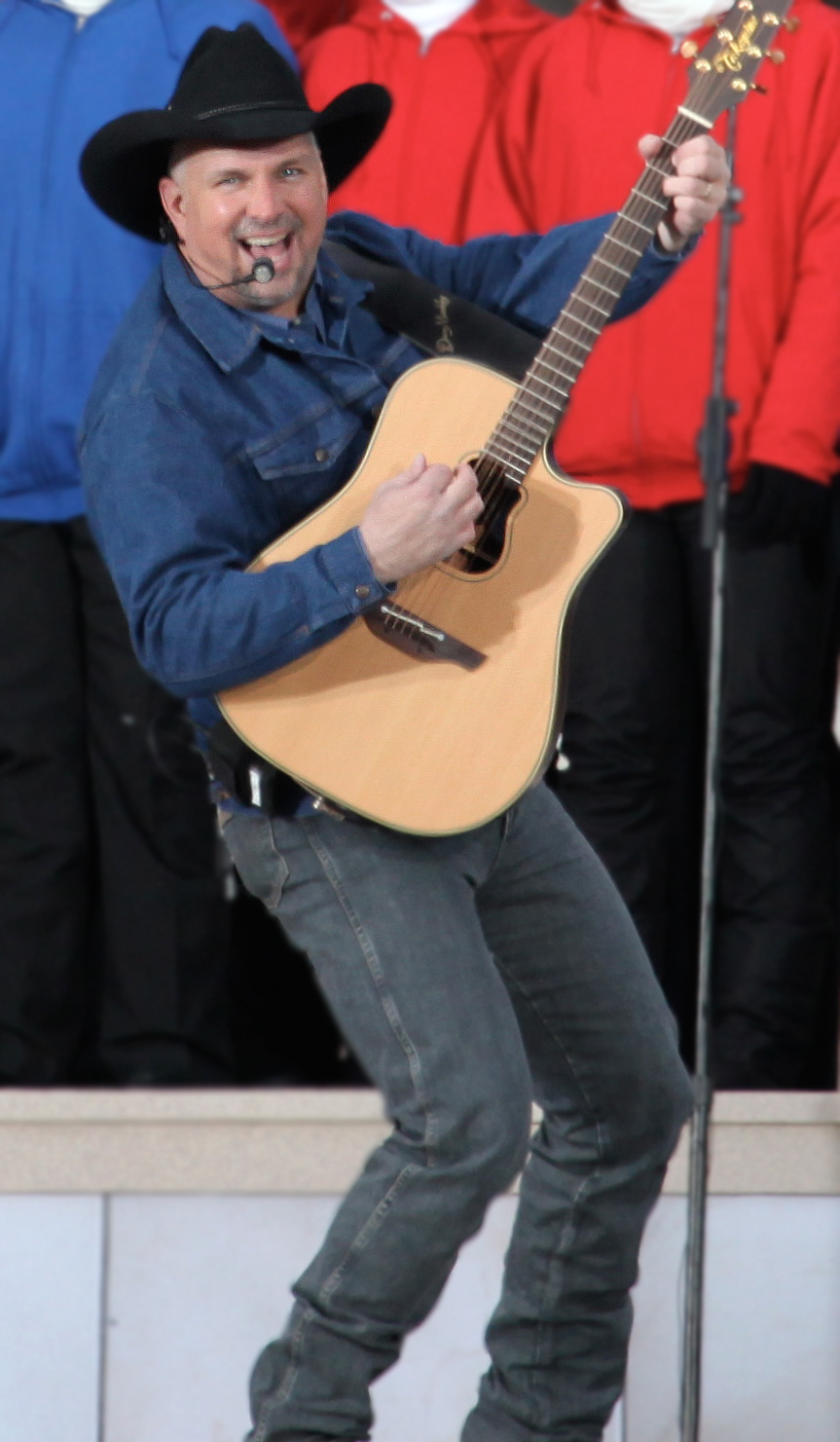
Garth Brooks entered the chart at number one with "More Than a Memory", the first time a song had ever debuted in the top spot of the Hot Country Songs chart.

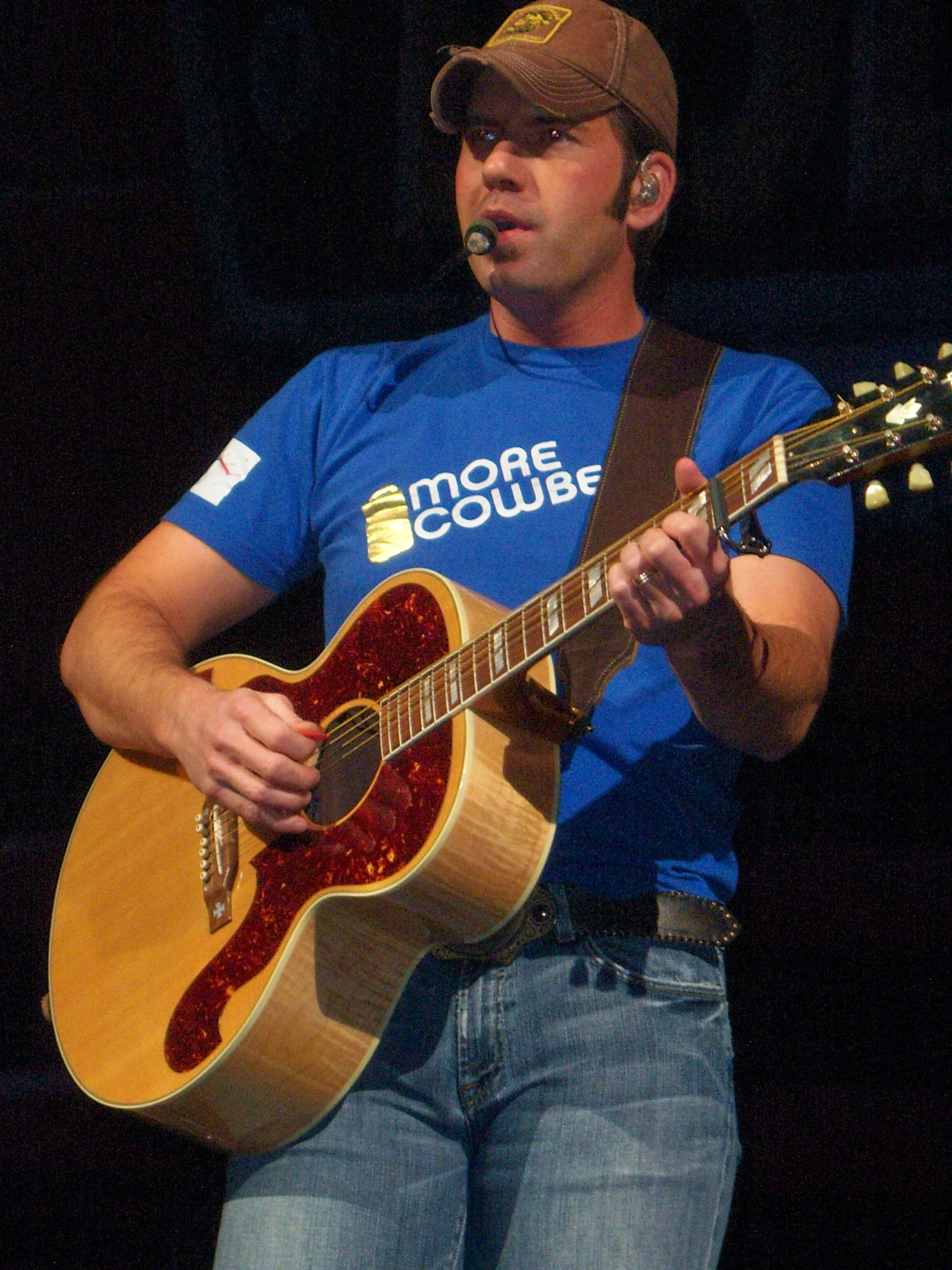
Rodney Atkins topped the chart twice in 2007.

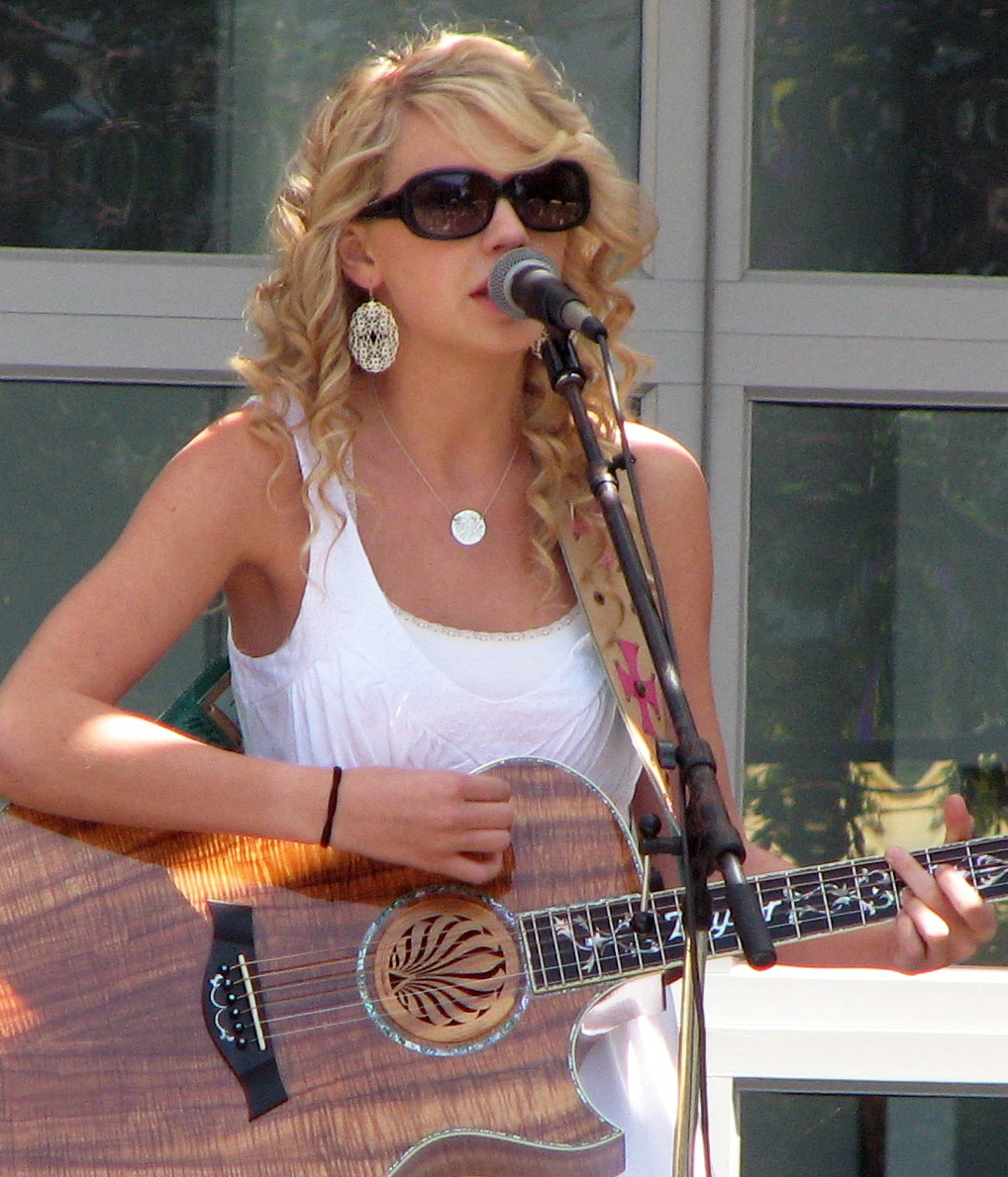
At the end of the year Taylor Swift achieved her first number one.

Issue date	Title	Artist(s)	Ref.
January 6	"She's Everything"	Brad Paisley	
January 13	"She's Everything"	Brad Paisley	
January 20	"She's Everything"	Brad Paisley	
January 27	"Watching You"	Rodney Atkins	
February 3	"Watching You"	Rodney Atkins	
February 10	"Watching You"	Rodney Atkins	
February 17	"Watching You"	Rodney Atkins	
February 24	"It Just Comes Natural"	George Strait	
March 3	"It Just Comes Natural"	George Strait	
March 10	"Ladies Love Country Boys"	Trace Adkins	
March 17	"Ladies Love Country Boys"	Trace Adkins	
March 24	"Beer in Mexico"	Kenny Chesney	
March 31	"Beer in Mexico"	Kenny Chesney	
April 7	"Beer in Mexico"	Kenny Chesney	
April 14	"Last Dollar (Fly Away)"	Tim McGraw	
April 21	"Wasted"	Carrie Underwood	
April 28	"Wasted"	Carrie Underwood	
May 5	"Wasted"	Carrie Underwood	
May 12	"Stand"	Rascal Flatts	
May 19	"Settlin'"	Sugarland	
May 26	"Good Directions"	Billy Currington	
June 2	"Good Directions"	Billy Currington	
June 9	"Good Directions"	Billy Currington	
June 16	"Moments"	Emerson Drive	
June 23	"Find Out Who Your Friends Are"	Tracy Lawrence	
June 30	"Ticks"	Brad Paisley	
July 7	"Lucky Man"	Montgomery Gentry	
July 14	"Lucky Man"	Montgomery Gentry	
July 21	"Lost in This Moment"	Big & Rich	
July 28	"Lost in This Moment"	Big & Rich	
August 4	"Never Wanted Nothing More"	Kenny Chesney	
August 11	"Never Wanted Nothing More"	Kenny Chesney	
August 18	"Never Wanted Nothing More"	Kenny Chesney	
August 25	"Never Wanted Nothing More"	Kenny Chesney	
September 1	"Never Wanted Nothing More"	Kenny Chesney	
September 8	"These Are My People"	Rodney Atkins	
September 15	"More Than a Memory"	Garth Brooks	
September 22	"Take Me There"	Rascal Flatts	
September 29	"Take Me There"	Rascal Flatts	
October 6	"Take Me There"	Rascal Flatts	
October 13	"Online"	Brad Paisley	
October 20	"Love Me If You Can"	Toby Keith	
October 27	"Don't Blink"	Kenny Chesney	
November 3	"Don't Blink"	Kenny Chesney	
November 10	"Don't Blink"	Kenny Chesney	
November 17	"Don't Blink"	Kenny Chesney	
November 24	"Free and Easy (Down the Road I Go)"	Dierks Bentley	
December 1	"So Small"	Carrie Underwood	
December 8	"So Small"	Carrie Underwood	
December 15	"So Small"	Carrie Underwood	
December 22	"Our Song"	Taylor Swift	
December 29	"Our Song"	Taylor Swift	

== See also ==
- 2007 in music
- List of artists who reached number one on the U.S. country chart
