= Carnival Ride =

Studio album by Carrie Underwood
- Released: October 23, 2007
- Recorded: 2006–07
- Studio: Starstruck (Nashville, Tennessee)
- Genre: Country
- Length: 50:07
- Labels: Arista Nashville; 19
- Producer: Mark Bright

Carrie Underwood chronology
Some Hearts (2005)	Carnival Ride (2007)	Play On (2009)

Singles from Carnival Ride
- 1. "So Small" Released: August 28, 2007; 2. "All-American Girl" Released: December 18, 2007; 3. "Last Name" Released: April 8, 2008; 4. "Just a Dream" Released: July 21, 2008; 5. "I Told You So" Released: February 2, 2009

Carnival Ride is the second studio album by American singer and songwriter Carrie Underwood. It was released in October 23, 2007, by Arista Nashville. On this album, Underwood was more involved in the songwriting process; she set up a writers' retreat at Nashville's famed Ryman Auditorium to collaborate with Music Row tunesmiths such as Hillary Lindsey, Craig Wiseman, Rivers Rutherford, and Gordie Sampson.

Carnival Ride debuted at number one on the US Billboard 200 chart, selling over 527,000 copies and achieving one of the biggest ever first-week sales by a female artist. It was the singer's first album to debut at number one on the Billboard 200 and second to debut atop the Top Country Albums chart. The album was certified quadruple platinum, it has sold 3.4 million copies in the United States, and four million copies worldwide.

Five singles were released from the album — "So Small", "All-American Girl", "Last Name", "Just a Dream", and "I Told You So". The first four singles reached number one on the US Billboard Hot Country Songs chart, thus making Underwood the first solo female artist to pull four number ones from one album since Shania Twain did so with her album The Woman in Me in 1995–1996. All singles were Top 30 hits on the Billboard Hot 100 chart, with "I Told You So" climbing to number nine and both "So Small" and "Last Name" reaching the Top 20.

The album and its songs were largely praised by music critics. Underwood won two Grammy Awards - one for Best Female Country Vocal Performance for "Last Name", at the 2009 Grammy Awards, and one for Best Country Collaboration with Vocals for "I Told You So", at the 2010 Grammy Awards. Carnival Ride was nominated for Album of the Year at the Academy of Country Music Awards and Country Music Association Awards and won the American Music Award for Favorite Country Album, in 2008.

== Background ==
You step onto this ride called life, and it's a crazy thing you don't know anything about, but you get on it anyway. You do what you can to lean different directions to try and get it to go where you want it to go, but you can't stop it – it just keeps moving. That's why Carnival Ride works as my album title, because it describes the wonderful craziness that I've been through over the past couple years.

— Underwood, explaining the meaning behind the album's title and theme

Two of Carnival Ride's tracks were recorded by other artists; "Flat on the Floor" was previously cut by singer Katrina Elam on her unreleased 2007 album Turn Me Up, and was a number 52 hit on the country charts for her that year. "I Told You So" is a cover of a song previously cut by Randy Travis on his 1988 number one album Always & Forever. Travis' version of the song was a Number One hit on the country charts that year. Underwood and Travis released "I Told You So" as a duet single on iTunes, and they also performed it on the results show of the eighth season of American Idol during the Grand Ole Opry week. The duet later went on to win the Grammy Award for Best Country Collaboration with Vocals. About the track, "I Know You Won't", Underwood said, "You get different feelings from different songs, and that one always just felt soft and vulnerable. It's a song about being disappointed. And, yeah, it's not so vibrato-heavy – but I guess it's good that I can do something that sounds different, maybe something surprising."

Underwood described the recording process of the album, saying: "We'll go in with everything in a key that I think is fine, and then he'll [Mark Bright] want to raise it a half-step, whole-step, step and a half, whatever. 'So Small' and 'All-American Girl' are surprisingly difficult to sing. 'All-American Girl' doesn't ever come down, really." She also admitted to having more creative control for this album, saying, "I was in the studio whether we were recording or not. If Mark [Bright] was doing something I'd come by and listen to the background vocals that were being put down, and if I found something I didn't like maybe I'd tell the background vocalists that I think it would sound better if we did it like this", she says. "Mark was super open because it's my voice and my album, and in the end I'm the one who should be most pleased with it."

== Promotion and release ==
Underwood promoted Carnival Ride through both a joint tour with Keith Urban, Love, Pain, and the Whole Crazy Carnival Ride Tour. It ran from January to April 2008, while simultaneously embarking on her first solo headliner, the Carnival Ride Tour, which ran from February to December 2008. She debuted several of her singles at the Academy of Country Music Awards and appeared on several shows to promote her album, including The Ellen DeGeneres Show, The Tonight Show with Jay Leno, The Late Show with David Letterman, Live With Regis and Kelly, The Early Show, and Good Morning America.

Carnival Ride's standard edition was released on October 23, 2007, in CD format, to digital download, and on streaming platforms, via Arista Nashville and 19 Recordings. A limited CD and DVD edition was made available at Target stores; the DVD includes four live acoustic performances as well as a four-part interview. A Platinum MusicPass edition followed on January 15, 2008, which includes a previously unreleased track "Sometimes You Leave" and two music videos. On October 21, a two-disc set was released at Walmart, containing five Christmas singles in the second CD: "Hark! The Herald Angels Sing", "The First Noel", "What Child Is This", "Do You Hear What I Hear", and "O Holy Night".

=== Singles ===
"So Small" served as the lead single for Carnival Ride. It was serviced to US country radio stations on July 31, 2007, becoming available via digital download on August 28. The song debuted on the US Hot Country Songs at number 20, making it the highest chart debut by a solo country female artist in 43 years of Nielsen BDS history. It held the number one spot for 3 consecutive weeks, and became her fifth top 20 hit when it peaked at number 17 on the US Billboard Hot 100. "So Small" has become a cross-over hit, selling over 1,088,000 downloads. The second single "All-American Girl" was released on December 17, 2007, in the United States. It also reached atop on the Hot Country Songs and spent two weeks on the chart, staying for five weeks on the Canadian Country Charts. It also managed to be a top 30 single on the Hot 100 where it peaked at number 27, making it her sixth top 30. As of 2025, "All-American Girl" sold over 3 million copies and was certified 3× platinum in the United States.

Released on April 8, 2008, Carnival Ride's third single "Last Name" became Underwood's fastest single to hit number one on the Hot Country Songs after 13 weeks of its release, staying a week on the chart. It is also Underwood's sixth top 20 hit, reaching number 19 on the Hot 100. The song won Underwood her third consecutive win for Grammy Award for Best Female Country Vocal Performance category. As of 2025, the song has sold over two million copies. The fourth single "Just a Dream", released on July 21, 2008, reached atop on the Hot Country Songs for the chart week of November 8, and spent two weeks on the chart, making Underwood the first solo female artist to pull four number one's from one album since Shania Twain did it with The Woman in Me. It became her seventh number one single on the Hot Country Songs chart. It also managed to reach number 29 on the Hot 100, becoming her tenth top 30 there. The song gave Underwood her fourth consecutive nomination for the Grammy Award for Best Female Country Vocal Performance. "Last Name" was certified platinum on the week ending on September 4, 2011, giving Underwood her seventh platinum hit. As of November 2015, it sold 1,280,000 copies.

The fifth single, "I Told You So" was released on February 2, 2009. It became Underwood's fourth top 10 all-genre hit, peaking at number nine on the Hot 100. On the week of April 10, it climbed to the top of the Canadian Country Charts and stayed there for one week. The song peaked at number two on the Hot Country Songs chart, making it only her second country single to not reach number one on that chart after Underwood's 2006 single "Don't Forget to Remember Me" which also peaked at number two. Underwood rerecorded the song with original artist Randy Travis, and the song won her and Travis the Grammy Award for Best Country Collaboration with Vocals. As of January 2013, the song has been certified platinum. It has sold 1,089,000 copies as of November 2015.

== Critical reception ==
Professional ratings
Aggregate scores
Source	Rating
Metacritic	72/100
Review scores
Source	Rating
AllMusic	4/5 stars
Boston Herald	B
The Cincinnati Post	B+
Digital Spy	3/5 stars
Entertainment Weekly	B+
Newsday	B
PopMatters	7/10 stars
Robert Christgau	(1-star Honorable Mention)
Rolling Stone	3.5/5 stars
Slant Magazine	2/5 stars

Carnival Ride received mostly positive reviews from music critics. On the music review aggregator Metacritic, it has received an average score of 72 out of 100 based on ten reviews indicating generally favorable reviews.

The first official review of the album from AllMusic gave it 4 out of 5 stars, on par with what they gave her debut. The site classified the album as "completely contemporary country", and said "the remarkable thing about Carnival Ride is that it's stronger song for song than Some Hearts." They also praised the album for having "the appearance of a genuine heart, something that no other big country-pop album has had since the glory days of Come On Over." USA Today also praised the album for its versatility saying "The songs call for vulnerability ("You Won't Find This"), urgency ("Flat on the Floor"), sympathy ("Crazy Dreams", her co-written salute to "the hairbrush singers and dashboard drummers" from whose ranks she sprang), humor ("The More Boys I Meet", the tag line of which goes "The more I love my dog") and extreme role-playing ('Last Name's saga of a bar pickup that turns into an impulsive Vegas marriage). She delivers on all counts." Rolling Stone praised Underwood's country stylings, writing, "Carnival Ride is more country and therefore more confident. She goes for the girl-next-door cred long since given up by Faith Hill in uptempo gems like 'The More Boys I Meet' ('The more I love my dog')." The Boston Herald gave the album a B, and claimed, "Underwood manages enough spunk to occasionally avoid the cookie-cutter, especially with the curious beat-box-meets-banjo arrangement of "Get Out of This Town" and "Just a Dream", a bona fide [tearjerker] about a young war widow." Slant Magazine gave a negative review, criticizing both the songwriting and Underwood's interpretation, writing, "Like Dion and McBride, Underwood has a rabid fanbase of people who sit in slack-jawed awe of her steely technical precision. Carnival Ride simply doesn't offer anything for the unconverted in terms of Underwood's growth either as a vocalist or as an artist."

=== Accolades ===
List of accolades
Award	Category	Result	Ref.
American Music Awards of 2008	Favorite Country Album	Won	

== Commercial performance ==
Carnival Ride became Underwood's first number-one album on the Billboard 200, selling 527,000 copies in its first week of release. It achieved one of the biggest ever first-week sales by a female artist at that time. The album also debuted at number 1 on the Top Digital Albums, Top Country Albums, and Top Canadian Albums charts. The album has sold 3,400,000 copies in the United States. In October 2016, the album was certified 4× platinum by the Recording Industry Association of America (RIAA) for combined sales and album-equivalent units of four million units. It appeared on the Billboard Year-End Charts for 2009 at number 74.

== Track listing ==
Carnival Ride track listing
No.	Title	Writer(s)	Length
1.	"Flat on the Floor"	Ashley Monroe; Brett James	3:18
2.	"All-American Girl"	Carrie Underwood; Ashley Gorley; Kelley Lovelace	3:32
3.	"So Small"	Underwood; Luke Laird; Hillary Lindsey	3:47
4.	"Just a Dream"	H. Lindsey; Gordie Sampson; Steve McEwan	4:44
5.	"Get Out of This Town"	H. Lindsey; Sampson; McEwan	3:01
6.	"Crazy Dreams"	Underwood; Barry Dean; Troy Verges	3:36
7.	"I Know You Won't"	Wendell Mobley; Neil Thrasher; McEwan	4:19
8.	"Last Name"	Underwood; Laird; H. Lindsey	4:02
9.	"You Won't Find This"	Cathy Dennis; Tom Shapiro	3:19
10.	"I Told You So"	Randy Travis	4:17
11.	"The More Boys I Meet"	Scott Kennedy; McEwan	3:33
12.	"Twisted"	James; Laird; H. Lindsey	3:56
13.	"Wheel of the World"	H. Lindsey; Aimee Mayo; Chris Lindsey	4:42
Total length:			50:07

== Personnel ==
=== Musicians ===
- Carrie Underwood – lead vocals, backing vocals
- Charles Judge – Hammond organ, synthesizer, strings, programming, lap steel guitar, drum loops
- Jimmy Nichols – piano, synthesizer
- Tom Bukovac – electric guitar
- Gordie Sampson – acoustic guitar, mandolin, piano
- Ilya Toshinsky – acoustic guitar, banjo
- Aubrey Haynie – mandolin, fiddle
- Jonathan Yudkin – mandolin, fiddle, cello (4), viola (4), violin (4), arco bass (4), string arrangements and composer (4)
- Paul Franklin – dobro, steel guitar
- Mike Johnson – steel guitar
- Jimmie Lee Sloas – bass guitar
- Matt Chamberlain – drums
- Chris McHugh – drums
- Eric Darken – percussion
- Chris McDonald – string arrangements and composer (7, 13)
- Carl Gorodetzky – string contractor (7, 13)
- Lisa Cochran – backing vocals
- Wes Hightower – backing vocals
- Hillary Lindsey – backing vocals

=== The Nashville String Machine (tracks 7 & 13) ===
- Cello – John Catchings, Anthony LaMarchina, Keith Nicholas, Carole Rabonowitz, Sari Reist and June Tanner
- Double bass – Jack Jezzro and Craig Nelson
- Viola – Monisa Angell, Bruce Christensen, Chris Farrell, Jim Grosjean, Gary Van Osdale and Kris Wilkinson
- Violin – David Angell, Carrie Bailey, Denise Baker, Zeneba Bowers, Beverly Drukker, Conni Ellisor, Carl Gorodetzky, Gerald Greer, Erin Hall, Cate Myer, Pamela Sixfin, Betty Small, Alan Umstead, Catherine Umstead and Karen Winkelmann

=== Production ===
- Mark Bright – producer
- Renée Bell – A&R
- Derek Bason – recording engineer, mixing
- Chris Ashburn – assistant recording, mix assistant
- Nathan Dickinson – assistant recording, mix assistant, digital editing
- Aaron Kasdorf – additional recording, assistant recording
- Todd Tidwell – additional recording, assistant recording
- J.R. Rodriguez – additional recording, digital editing
- Hank Williams – mastering at Master Mix (Nashville, Tennessee)
- Kirsten Wines – production assistant
- Mike "Frog" Griffith – production coordination
- Judy Forde Blair – creative director, liner notes
- S. Wade Hunt – art direction
- Astrid Herbold May – design
- Andrew Eccles – photography
- Mellissa Schleicher – make-up, hair stylist
- Trish Townsend – stylist
- Ann Edelblute – management
- Simon Fuller – management

== Charts ==
=== Weekly charts ===
Weekly chart performance
Chart (2007)	Peak position
Australian Albums (ARIA)	105
Australian Country Albums (ARIA)	9
Canadian Albums (Billboard)	1
Canadian Country Albums (Billboard)	1
UK Country Albums (Official Charts)	2
US Billboard 200	1
US Top Country Albums (Billboard)	1

=== Year-end charts ===
Year-end chart performance
Chart (2007)	Position
US Billboard 200	56
US Top Country Albums (Billboard)	9
Chart (2008)	Position
US Billboard 200	9
US Top Country Albums (Billboard)	3
Chart (2009)	Position
US Billboard 200	60
US Top Country Albums (Billboard)	12

=== Decade-end charts ===
Decade-end chart performance
Chart (2000–09)	Peak position
US Billboard 200	132

== Certifications ==
Certifications and sales
Region	Certification	Certified units/sales
Canada (Music Canada)	Platinum	100,000^{^}
United States (RIAA)	4× Platinum	4,000,000^{‡} / 3,400,000
^{^} Shipments figures based on certification alone.

== Release history ==
Release dates and formats
Region	Date	Format	Label	Ref.
Various	October 23, 2007	CD; digital download; streaming	Arista Nashville; 19	
