= So Small =

Single by Carrie Underwood

from the album Carnival Ride
- Released: July 31, 2007
- Length: 3:47
- Label: Arista Nashville
- Songwriters: Carrie Underwood; Hillary Lindsey; Luke Laird
- Producer: Mark Bright

Carrie Underwood singles chronology
| "I'll Stand By You" (2007) | "So Small" (2007) | "All-American Girl" (2007) |

Alternative cover
- Original cover

Music video
- "So Small" on YouTube

"So Small" is a song co-written and recorded by American singer Carrie Underwood. It was serviced to US country radio stations on July 31, 2007, as the first single from her second studio album, Carnival Ride (2007). Underwood co-wrote the song with Hillary Lindsey and Luke Laird.

== Background ==
"So Small" is the first single for which Underwood shares a writing credit. Underwood co-wrote the song "I Ain't In Checotah Anymore", but it was not released as a single from her debut album, Some Hearts. Underwood explained about the song:

"So Small" is a feeling song on how people invest so much of their time and energy into things that aren't really important, and you don't really realize that until it's too late. We're all guilty of it, as I know I am, of just letting silly things get in the way. The smallest thing can almost ruin my day, and at some point, I realize, 'Good gracious, Carrie! What are you doing?' I have a great life, and we need to remember the things that are truly important.

== Release ==
"So Small" was officially released to country radio stations on July 31, 2007. The single was digitally released on Napster on August 14, 2007, the same day it was made available for sale on the Canadian iTunes Store, but was removed after several days. The song was permanently available for download on Napster and released on the U.S. iTunes Store on August 28, 2007. She debuted this song at the 2007 Country Music Association Awards.

== Commercial performance ==
"So Small" debuted at number 20 on the Billboard Hot Country Songs on August 18, 2007, marking the highest chart entry by a solo country female artist in 43 years of Nielsen BDS history. The record would later be surpassed by Taylor Swift's 2012 single "We Are Never Ever Getting Back Together." The song debut in the Hot 100 at 98. It jumped 76 positions on the Hot 100 in its third week on the chart, from 93 to 17, with 71,000 digital downloads, becoming Underwood's fifth top 20 hit on the chart. As of May 2012, the single has been certified Platinum. It has sold 1,088,000 copies as of November 2015.

The song also became Underwood's fourth number-one single on the Billboard country music charts, peaking for three weeks, and her fifth consecutive number-one country single overall. "So Small" was displaced by Swift's "Our Song", making it the first time since 1999 that a solo female artist replaced another atop the chart.

== Awards and nominations ==
=== 2010 CMA Triple-Play Awards ===
| Year | Nominee / work | Award | Result |
|---|---|---|---|
| 2010 | "So Small" | Triple-Play Songwriter (along with "All-American Girl" and "Last Name") | Won |

=== 2008 CMT Music Awards ===
| Year | Nominee / work | Award | Result |
|---|---|---|---|
| 2008 | "So Small" | Female Video of the Year | Nominated |

=== 14th Inspirational Country Music Awards ===
| Year | Nominee / work | Award | Result |
|---|---|---|---|
| 2008 | "So Small" | Inspirational Country Music Video of the Year | Nominated |

=== 2008 BMI Awards ===
| Year | Nominee / work | Award | Result |
|---|---|---|---|
| 2008 | "So Small" | Songwriter of the Year (Carrie Underwood) | Won |

== Music video ==
Underwood's video for "So Small" was directed by Roman White. The video was originally planned to be premiering on September 13 on CMT, but instead premiered on September 20, 2007, on CMT, where the channel became "Carrie Music Television" and aired the video continuously from 6:00 am–12:00 pm straight, playing it an estimated 66 times. The video was also made available to purchase exclusively on the iTunes music store on September 20.

The video begins with a teenage girl walking down a country road alone at dusk, carrying only a backpack. A flashback is shown of her arguing with her mother before she walks out of her house. Two cars are then shown approaching her from opposite ends, driven by a man (played by Christian Kane) and a crying woman. As the woman's car nears the teenager, she steps in front of it in a suicide attempt. The woman swerves to the left side of the road to avoid hitting her, colliding instead with the man's car. Both vehicles freeze in mid-collision with their occupants unharmed and unaffected by the collision, while the front of the vehicles crumple from the impact and the windshields shatter, sending glass flying everywhere. Both the man and the woman have flashbacks of themselves leaving home after having a fight with and then leaving their respective families. As the night fades with a sunrise, the collision is reversed, and the teenager steps back from the road instead of onto it. Seeing this, both the man and the woman stop their cars and step out. The video ends with the three of them returning to their homes and reconciling with their families. Underwood is also seen throughout the video standing in the middle of the road in separate shots, singing both at night and in the morning.

== Charts ==
=== Weekly charts ===
"So Small" weekly chart performance
| Chart (2007) | Peak position |
|---|---|
| Canada Hot 100 (Billboard) | 14 |
| Canada Country (Billboard) | 3 |
| US Billboard Hot 100 | 17 |
| US Christian AC (Billboard) | 21 |
| US Hot Country Songs (Billboard) | 1 |

=== Year-end charts ===
"So Small" year-end chart performance
| Chart (2007) | Position |
|---|---|
| US Country Songs (Billboard) | 37 |

== Release history ==
"So Small" release history
| Region | Date | Format | Label | Ref. |
|---|---|---|---|---|
| Canada | August 14, 2007 | Music download | Sony Music | |
| Australia | August 14, 2007 | Music download | Sony Music | |
| United States | August 28, 2007 | Music download | Arista Nashville | |
| Canada | August 28, 2007 | Airplay | Sony Music | |
| Australia | August 28, 2007 | Airplay | Sony Music | |
| United States | August 28, 2007 | Airplay | Arista Nashville | |
| New Zealand | October 20, 2007 | Music download | Sony Music | |
