= Our Song =

2007 single by Taylor Swift

Single by Taylor Swift

from the album Taylor Swift
- Released: September 10, 2007
- Studio: Quad; Sound Cottage (Nashville)
- Genre: Country
- Length: 3:22
- Label: Big Machine
- Songwriter: Taylor Swift
- Producer: Nathan Chapman

Taylor Swift singles chronology
"Teardrops on My Guitar" (2007)	"Our Song" (2007)	"Picture to Burn" (2008)

Music video
- "Our Song" on YouTube

"Our Song" is a song by the American singer-songwriter Taylor Swift and the third single from her debut studio album, Taylor Swift (2006). She wrote "Our Song" for a high school talent show during ninth grade and included it in the album after it became popular among her classmates. The lyrics are about a young couple using regular events in their lives to create their own song. Produced by Nathan Chapman, "Our Song" is an uptempo banjo-driven country track incorporating fiddles and drums. Big Machine Records released it to US country radio on September 10, 2007.

Music critics lauded Swift's songwriting on "Our Song" for incorporating conversational lyrics and a memorable hook. It featured on Rolling Stone's 2019 list of the best country songs by female artists since 2000. Peaking atop Hot Country Songs for six weeks, the single made the then 17-year-old Swift the youngest person to single-handedly write and sing a number-one single on Hot Country Songs. "Our Song" peaked at number 16 on the Billboard Hot 100 and was certified four times platinum by the Recording Industry Association of America. It peaked at number 30 on the Canadian Hot 100 and was certified platinum by Music Canada.

Trey Fanjoy directed the song's music video, which premiered on CMT on September 24, 2007, and won Video of the Year at the 2008 CMT Music Awards. Swift performed the song on televised programs and during many festivals, and included it in the set lists of the Fearless Tour (2009–2010) and the Speak Now World Tour (2011–2012). She has occasionally performed the song on her later tours.

== Production and release ==
In 2004, Pennsylvania-born Taylor Swift moved to Nashville, Tennessee at fourteen to pursue a career in country music. She signed with Sony/ATV in 2004 to become a professional songwriter, and with Big Machine Records in 2005 to become a country-music singer. Near the end of 2005, Swift recorded songs for her self-titled debut album with the producer Nathan Chapman. By the time production wrapped, Swift had completed her first year of high school in Hendersonville, Tennessee. She wrote three tracks by herself—"The Outside", "Should've Said No", and "Our Song". "Our Song" is a track Swift wrote for a talent show in ninth grade. She conceived the song as an upbeat track with lyrics relatable to her classmates, writing it within twenty minutes. On the inspiration, Swift said: "I wrote it about this guy I was dating, and how we didn't have a song. So I went ahead and wrote us one."

Months after the talent show, her classmates came up to her and recited the melody and lyrics, which made her think, "There must be something here!" To this end, she insisted that Big Machine Records executives include it on the track list. Swift envisioned the production in her head before approaching Chapman. According to the album's liner notes, instruments and their corresponding musicians on "Our Song" include acoustic guitar (Swift), banjo and electric guitar (Chapman), Dobro (Bruce Bouton), drums (Nick Buda), percussion (Eric Darken), fiddle (Rob Hajacos), and bass guitar (Tim Marks). The track was recorded by Chad Carlson, assisted by Chapman, at Sound Cottage and Quad Studios in Nashville. It was mixed by Chuck Ainley, assisted by Greg Lawrence, at Masterfonics. Swift chose the song as the album's closing track because she thought the final refrain's lyric, "Play it again," would subliminally suggest the listener to replay the album.

Swift's debut album was released on October 24, 2006, through Big Machine Records. "Our Song" was the third single from the album; Big Machine released the song to US country radio on September 10, 2007, and as a crossover single to US pop radio on March 10, 2008, in partnership with Republic Records. "Our Song" was later included in the international version of Swift's second studio album, Fearless, released in March 2009. Following a 2019 dispute over the talent manager Scooter Braun's acquisition of Big Machine and the masters to Swift's back catalog, Big Machine re-released "Our Song" on limited-edition vinyl in October 2019.

== Lyrics and music ==
"Our Song" has narrative lyrics about a young couple's love life. In the first verse, the narrator and her boyfriend are traveling in a car, "He's got a one-hand feel on the steering wheel, the other on my heart." As they listen to the radio, the narrator tells her boyfriend they do not have a song to call their own. In the refrain, the boyfriend responds that their song consists of sounds drawing from their daily lives that he associates with their relationship. The boyfriend says, "Our song is the slammin' screen door/ Sneakin' out late, tappin' on your window"; critics consider the "slammin' screen door" imagery the song's hook and most memorable lyrical detail. The narrator replies, "Our song is the way he laughs/ The first date, man, I didn't kiss him when I should have."

In the refrain's final lines, she asks God "if he could play it again" when she gets home. The song ends with the lyrics, "I grabbed a pen/ And an old napkin/ And I wrote down our song", self-referencing Swift's occupation as a songwriter. According to the humanities and literature scholar Stephen Grandchamp, these final lines have a feminist undertone. Whereas Swift's narrator initially assumes a passive role in a heteronormative relationship ("ridin' shotgun" in her boyfriend's car, pondering how "we don't have a song"), she ends up writing one, assuming an active role as an artist. Grandchamp argued that this became a motif that Swift frequently used in her later songs: framing romantic relationships as broader commentary on gender roles and popular music authorship.

"Our Song" (2007)
The refrain of "Our Song", a banjo-driven country song with lyrics about a couple creating their own song from their daily experience

Built on a banjo riff, "Our Song" is a country-music track featuring a fiddle solo in the break. The musicologist James E. Perone wrote that the production conveyed the conversational lyrics by employing repeated pitches in the lower register of Swift's vocals in the verses, where she sings at one pitch for a sustained period. According to the BBC, the verses exemplify Swift's "one-note melody", which effectively conveys the narrative and becomes a staple in many of her subsequent songs. The refrain emphasizes the fifth scale-step with a wider-ranging melody and higher-pitched vocals, which Perone described as upbeat and tuneful. In the song, Swift sings with twangy vocals and uses a Southern accent, brought about by her move from Pennsylvania to Tennessee as a teenager. Swift pronounces the pronoun "I" closer to the monophthong "ah" and sings the words "car" and "heart" with a non-rhotic accent. She plays on the lack of verb agreement in Southern American English in the lyric "your mama don't know".

Critics debated whether "Our Song" is country music. J. Freedom du Lac from The Washington Post and Nick Jones from Vulture opined that there are influences of hip-hop and rhythmic music on the phrasing and the final refrain's compressed drums. Maura Johnston from Pitchfork commented that apart from country fiddles and twang, the melody was influenced by "millennial teen pop". Grady Smith from Rolling Stone selected it as one of Swift's "countriest songs" due to the instruments and Southern accent. In an article for JSTOR, the linguist Chi Luu argued that Swift employed a Southern accent as a means to signify her authenticity in country music. Because Swift came from an upper middle class background, which differentiated her from other female country musicians singing about overcoming hardships and poverty, the Southern accent was an important means for her early image as a country-music artist. The musicologist Nate Sloan pointed to the conversational lyrics drawing on mundane daily-life experience as Swift's embodiment of country songwriting tropes.

== Critical reception ==
"Our Song" was one of the "Award-Winning Songs" at the 2008 BMI Country Awards, which honors the year's best songwriters. It featured on Rolling Stone's 2019 list of the best female country songs from 2000. Jeff Tamarkin of AllMusic and Seija Rankin and Lauren Huff from Entertainment Weekly picked it as a standout on Swift's debut album, and Fiona Chua of MTV Asia selected it as one of the best tracks on the international version of Fearless. Critics praised Swift's songwriting for creating a catchy hook. Nate Jones of Vulture and Jonathan Keefe of Slant Magazine found the melody and hook captivating, noting them for incorporating pop and hip hop elements. Rob Sheffield from Rolling Stone wrote about the song, "The hit that made me a Swift fan, the first moment I heard it in 2007 [...] What a genius hook."

Other critics praised the theme and conversational lyrics. Sasha Frere-Jones in The New Yorker was impressed by the simple phrases "so conversational that on first hearing they fly by without registering" and said the song was Swift's first to "stop [him] in [his] tracks". Billboard's Deborah Evan Price deemed the conversational lyrics appealing to those who want to revisit the "tender memories of uncomplicated young love". In a review for Blender, Sheffield found the narrative full of "personality and poise". In Pitchfork, Johnston selected the track as one of Swift's early songwriting demonstrations for earnestly portraying teenage sentiments. Alexis Petridis from The Guardian said the "snappy, self-referential lyrics" predicated Swift's success beyond country music, and Hannah Mylrea from NME found the lyrics vivid. In a ranking of Swift's discography, Roisin O'Connor of The Independent picked "Our Song" among her five best songs: "[Her] making a song about a song based on sounds from real-life is all kinds of perfect."

== Commercial performance ==
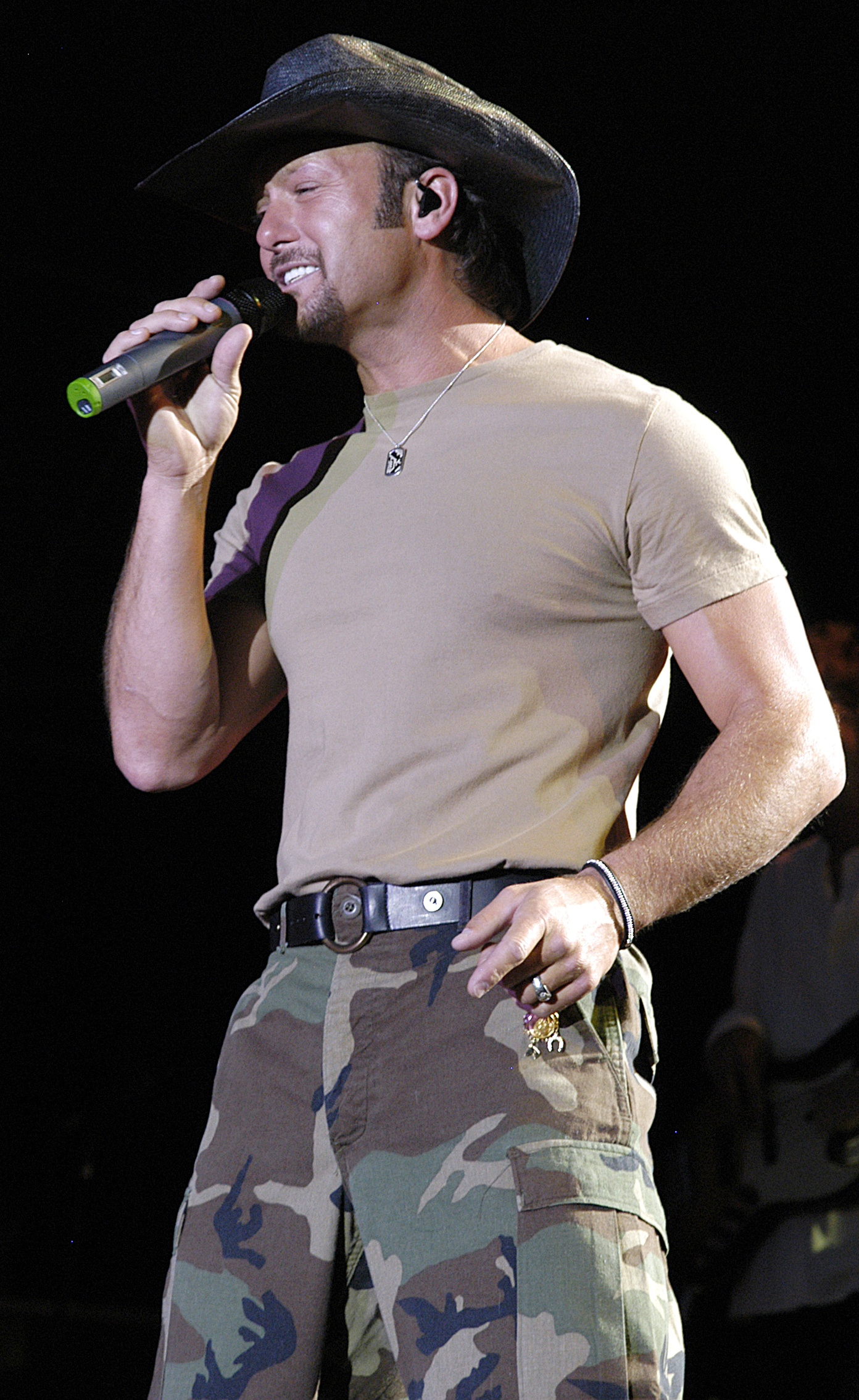
"Our Song" had the biggest jump to number one on Hot Country Songs since "Just to See You Smile" (1998) by Tim McGraw (pictured).

"Our Song" was a success on country radio. It reached number one on the Hot Country Songs chart dated December 22, 2007, giving Swift her first chart topper. The song's jump from number six to number one marked the biggest jump to the top since Tim McGraw's "Just to See You Smile" (1998), which also ascended five spots to the top. With this achievement, Swift became the youngest person—17 years old at the time—to single-handedly write and sing a Hot Country Songs number one. It spent six consecutive weeks at number one and 24 weeks in total on the chart. The success of "Our Song" on country radio turned Swift into a rising star in the genre, which had been predominantly dominated by adult male musicians in the early 2000s decade.

On the all-genre Billboard Hot 100, the single peaked at number 16, becoming the third consecutive Hot 100 top-forty single from Swift's debut album. On the Pop Songs chart, which tracks pop radio in the United States, it peaked at number 18 and was Swift's second crossover appearance, following "Teardrops on My Guitar". The Recording Industry Association of America in August 2014 certified the track four times platinum for surpassing four million units based on sales and streaming. By July 2019, "Our Song" had sold 3.4 million digital copies in the United States.

In Canada, "Our Song" peaked atop the Canada Country chart for four weeks. It peaked at number 30 on the Canadian Hot 100, the best-charting song from Swift's debut album, and was certified platinum by Music Canada for 80,000 digital copies sold. In South Korea, the single peaked at number 104 on the International Singles Chart compiled in 2012 by Gaon.

== Music video ==
The music video for "Our Song" was shot on August 14, 2007 and was directed by Trey Fanjoy, who had directed the music videos for Swift's past singles. Compared to the previous videos, "Our Song" does not feature a clear narrative and instead is a compilation of disparate scenes with vibrant colors and symbols. Swift talked about the concept: "[Fanjoy] had this idea for a front porch performance and then a field of flowers for another performance, then a black-and-white performance shot. It all came together in her head. She was able to translate that so well onto film. It just shows what a truly great director she is." The video features Swift's backing band as guest stars. It aired on CMT, CMT Pure, and Great American Country on September 24, 2007, and was included on the DVD reissue of Swift's debut album, released on November 6, 2007.

In the video, Swift performs in different outfits for different settings; in one scene, she performs with a glitter-encrusted guitar. Many of the outfits are associated with mid-2000s fashion, such as pink lip gloss, layered tank tops with Soffe shorts, and black elbow-length arm warmers. Swift had two dresses custom made for the video. Spin commented that "Our Song" was Swift's first music video that incorporates visually stimulating elements: "All the colors fall somewhere between fantastical (like Swift's bright blue fairy dress) and excessive (like the pool of roses she sits in)." Jason Lipshutz from Billboard called it "one of her simplest, sweetest music videos". According to Glamour, Swift's bright and feminine style without using designer clothing in "Our Song" helped shape her relatable image in her early career.

"Our Song" was the number-one video on CMT for seven weeks. It received a nomination for "Number One Streamed Music Video" at the web-hosted 2008 CMT Online Awards, but lost to Carrie Underwood's "All-American Girl". At the 2008 CMT Music Awards, it won Video of the Year and Female Video of the Year.

== Live performances ==
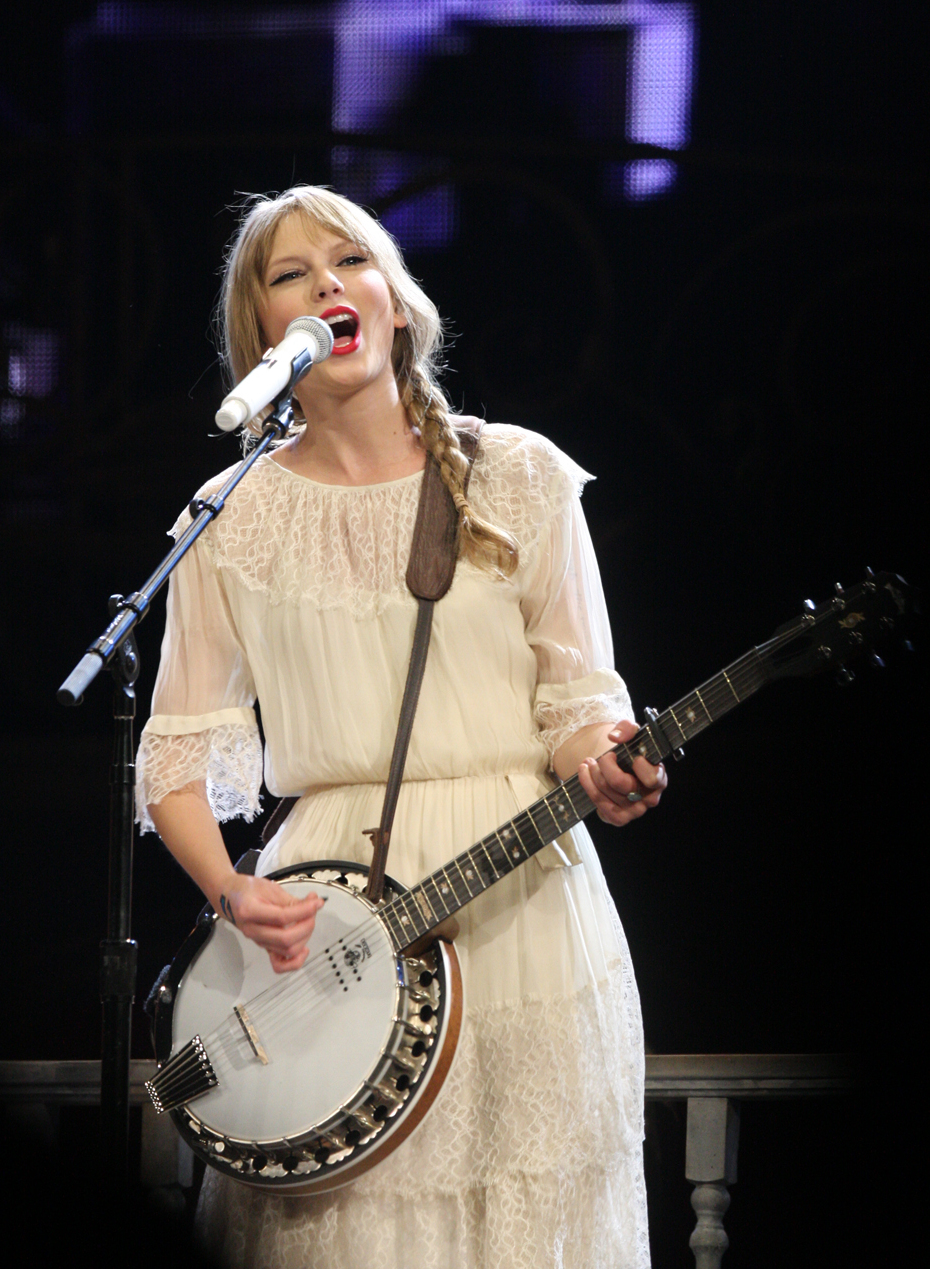
Swift performing "Our Song" on the Speak Now World Tour in 2012

During promotion of her debut album, Swift included "Our Song" in the set list of a US promotional tour in 2008. The song was part of her set list as the opening act to Brad Paisley's 2007 tour and Rascal Flatts's 2008 tour. She performed the song on televised shows including Live! with Regis and Kelly, Dance War: Bruno vs. Carrie Ann, and The Ellen DeGeneres Show. On November 7, 2007, Swift performed the song at the Country Music Association Awards, where she won the Horizon Award honoring the best new artist of the year. A performance recorded at an Apple store in SoHo, New York, was released as part of an iTunes Store-exclusive live extended play on January 15, 2008.

Swift and the English rock band Def Leppard performed "Our Song", among other tracks from each artist's discography, for a CMT Crossroads episode in October 2008; the performance was recorded and released on DVD in 2009. The song was part of the set lists for many festivals Swift headlined, including the Greeley Stampede in 2007, the Stagecoach Festival in 2008, and a round of festivals in 2009 including the Houston Livestock Show and Rodeo, the Florida Strawberry Festival, the CMA Music Festival, and Craven Country Jamboree. In 2012, Swift sang the song as part of a VH1 Storytellers episode taped at Harvey Mudd College in California.

Swift included "Our Song" on the set list of her first headlining concert tour, the Fearless Tour (2009–2010); she sang the song on a sparkling silver guitar, in a sparkly silver dress and boots. The track was part of the set list for the North American and Oceanic shows for Swift's next tour, the Speak Now World Tour (2011–2012); during the performance, she played the song on a banjo in front of a porch setting, dressed in white. She sang an acoustic version of the song on several dates of her later tours, including the Red Tour (Pittsburgh, July 2013), and the Reputation Stadium Tour (Chicago, June 2018). During the July 14, 2018, show of the Reputation Stadium Tour in Philadelphia, Swift performed it a cappella after a technical malfunction.

On the Eras Tour, Swift performed "Our Song" four times. In 2023, she performed the song on acoustic guitar during the Las Vegas show on March 24, and during the Los Angeles show on August 4. In 2024, she also sang the track as part of a mashup with her song "Jump Then Fall" (2010) during the Madrid show on May 30, and as a mashup with "Call It What You Want" (2017) during the New Orleans show on October 25. At the 60th Annual Country Music Association Awards in November 2026, she performed "Our Song" in a mashup with "I Knew It, I Knew You".

== Credits and personnel ==
Credits are adapted from the liner notes of Taylor Swift.

- Taylor Swift – vocals, songwriter, guitar, harmony vocals
- Nathan Chapman – producer, banjo, acoustic guitar, electric guitar, harmony vocals, additional recording
- Chuck Ainlay – mixing
- Chad Carlson – recording
- Aaron Chmielewski – assistant engineering
- Greg Lawrence – assistant mixing
- Bruce Bouton – Dobro
- Nick Buda – drums
- Eric Darken – percussion
- Rob Hajacos – fiddle
- Tim Marks – bass

== Charts ==
=== Weekly charts ===
2007–2008 weekly charts
Chart (2007–2008)	Peak position
Canada Hot 100 (Billboard)	30
Canada CHR/Top 40 (Billboard)	48
Canada Country (Billboard)	1
US Billboard Hot 100	16
US Hot Country Songs (Billboard)	1
US Pop Airplay (Billboard)	18
US Pop 100 (Billboard)	24

2012 weekly chart
Chart (2012)	Peak position
South Korea International Singles (Gaon)	104

=== Year-end charts ===
2008 year-end charts
Chart (2008)	Position
US Billboard Hot 100	41
US Hot Country Songs (Billboard)	39

=== All-time chart ===
All-time chart
Chart (1958–2016)	Position
US Hot Country Songs (Billboard)	88

== Certifications ==
Certifications
Region	Certification	Certified units/sales
Australia (ARIA)	3× Platinum	210,000^{‡}
Canada (Music Canada)	Platinum	80,000^{*}
New Zealand (RMNZ)	Platinum	30,000^{‡}
United Kingdom (BPI)	Gold	400,000^{‡}
United States (RIAA)	4× Platinum	4,000,000^{‡}
United States (RIAA) Mastertone	Gold	500,000^{*}
^{*} Sales figures based on certification alone.^{‡} Sales+streaming figures based on certification alone.

== Release history ==
Release dates and formats
Region	Date	Format	Label	Ref.
United States	September 10, 2007	Country radio	Big Machine	
United States	March 10, 2008	Contemporary hit radio	Big Machine; Republic	
United States	October 24, 2019	7-inch vinyl	Big Machine	

== See also ==
- List of number-one US country singles of 2007 and 2008
- List of number-one Canadian country singles of 2007 and 2008
