= Last Name (song) =

2008 single by Carrie Underwood

Single by Carrie Underwood

from the album Carnival Ride
- Released: April 8, 2008 (U.S.)
- Recorded: 2007
- Studio: Starstruck Studios (Nashville, TN)
- Genre: Country rock
- Length: 4:02
- Label: Arista Nashville
- Songwriters: Luke Laird; Hillary Lindsey; Carrie Underwood
- Producer: Mark Bright

Carrie Underwood singles chronology
| "All-American Girl" (2007) | "Last Name" (2008) | "Praying for Time" (2008) |

Music video
- "Carrie Underwood - Last Name (Official Video)" on YouTube

"Last Name" is a song recorded by American country music singer Carrie Underwood and written by Underwood, Hillary Lindsey, and Luke Laird. It is the third single from Underwood's second studio album, Carnival Ride. It was released in the United States on April 7, 2008, by which point the song had already charted. At the 51st Grammy Awards, the song won Underwood her third consecutive Grammy Award for Best Female Country Vocal Performance. It has sold 1,300,000 copies to date.

== Background ==
The song is one of four tracks on the album co-written by Underwood, and the third consecutive one to be released as a single from the album.

== Content ==
The song is a moderate up-tempo describing a woman meeting a man at a club and later eloping with him in Las Vegas after having had too much to drink that night. She wakes up the next morning, "thinkin' 'bout Elvis somewhere in Vegas", to discover that she does not even know her last name (i.e., she married the man while she was still intoxicated), and worries that her "mama would be so ashamed." The music video portrays the song as a prequel to her "Before He Cheats" song, even going so far as to hire the same actor to play the man in question.

== Critical reception ==
The single was generally met with mixed reviews.

Allmusic picked the song as a "track pick", calling the song "Miranda Lambert filtered through Shania Twain", and dubbed it a "one night stand anthem." Rolling Stone picked the track as their favorite, saying "the most fun is "Last Name," where she gets wasted and runs off to Vegas with a guy she doesn't know." Blender awarded the song four out of five stars, describing the song as the "most irresponsible (and fun) moment on the new album involves one wild night, one too many shots of Cuervo and one unexpected ring." Billboard gave a positive review of the track, praising the lyrics: "It's a cleverly penned lyric that hilariously celebrates drunken debauchery" as well as summing it up as "a performance that combines soulful vocals, edgy intensity and sassy attitude into a delicious cocktail."

However, it also received some negative reviews: Engine 145 gave the song a 'thumbs down', describing the song as a "straight-laced performance" that just "places the focus on the vocal". Slant Magazine labelled the single as a "bald-faced attempt at recreating the 'Before He Cheats' phenomenon".

== Awards ==
=== 35th People's Choice Awards ===
| Year | Nominee / work | Award | Result |
|---|---|---|---|
| 2009 | "Last Name" | Country Song of the Year | Won |

=== 51st Grammy Awards ===
| Year | Nominee / work | Award | Result |
|---|---|---|---|
| 2009 | "Last Name" | Best Female Country Vocal Performance | Won |

=== 2010 CMA Triple-Play Awards ===
| Year | Nominee / work | Award | Result |
|---|---|---|---|
| 2010 | "Last Name" | Triple-Play Songwriter (along with "So Small", "All-American Girl") | Won |

=== 2009 BMI Awards ===
| Year | Nominee / work | Award | Result |
|---|---|---|---|
| 2009 | "Last Name" | Songwriter of the Year (Carrie Underwood) | Won |

== Promotion ==
Underwood performed the song live for the first time on television during the 43rd Annual Academy of Country Music Awards on May 18, 2008. She performed the song live at the seventh season finale of American Idol on May 21, 2008. She performed the song at the 51st Annual Grammy Awards on February 8, 2009.

== Music video ==
The song is described in the video as what happened before the "Before He Cheats" video.

The video starts with some segments from "Before He Cheats" and then goes into a scene three months earlier ("before he cheated", it says) with her in the club drinking with her friends. The same man from the "Before He Cheats" spots her and asks her for a dance. From this point on, while the guy is with Underwood, he is flirting with every other woman he sees. After the dance, Underwood leaves with the guy in his car with fuzzy dice in the rear view mirror. They make it out to Las Vegas where they participate in a couple of gambling activities such as roulette and a Wheel of Fortune game where they win a new truck. Later they get married at chapel of the flowers with an Elvis impersonator officiating. They run off in his new pickup truck (the one used in "Before He Cheats") and the video ends with a spark from the chapel sign lights.

== Chart performance ==
The song debuted at number 46 on the U.S. Billboard Hot Country Songs chart, nearly a month before the single's official release. For the week of June 21, 2008 it rose from number five to number one, to become her fifth straight number one on the Billboard chart, her seventh straight number one country single, and her eighth number one Billboard single overall. This marked Underwood as the first solo female artist to have five consecutive number one's on the country survey in almost 20 years, since Rosanne Cash had a string of six number one titles between 1987 and 1989. It is the third country number one from Carnival Ride and reached the top of the chart faster than the first two singles, taking only 13 weeks. "Last Name" has sold 1,300,000 downloads as of November 2015.

On the Hot 100 the song reached number 19, making it Underwood's fifth top 20 Hot 100 hit, and the second from Carnival Ride.

== Charts ==
| Chart (2008) | Peak position |
|---|---|
| Canada Hot 100 (Billboard) | 34 |
| Canada Country (Billboard) | 3 |
| US Billboard Hot 100 | 19 |
| US Adult Pop Airplay (Billboard) | 31 |
| US Hot Country Songs (Billboard) | 1 |

=== Year-end charts ===
| Chart (2008) | Position |
|---|---|
| US Country Songs (Billboard) | 27 |

== Certifications ==
Certifications for Last Name
| Region | Certification | Certified units/sales |
|---|---|---|
| United States (RIAA) | 2× Platinum | 2,000,000^{‡} |
^{‡} Sales+streaming figures based on certification alone.

== Release history ==
| Region | Date | Format | Label |
|---|---|---|---|
| United States | April 8, 2008 | Airplay | Arista Nashville |
| Canada | April 8, 2008 | Airplay | Sony Music |
| United Kingdom | April 9, 2008 | Airplay | Sony Music |

== Cover versions ==
- Kristin Chenoweth performed a cover of the song in the Fox comedy-musical Glee.
