= All-American Girl (song) =

2007 single by Carrie Underwood

Single by Carrie Underwood

from the album Carnival Ride
- Released: December 17, 2007 (U.S.)
- Recorded: 2007
- Studio: Starstruck Studios (Nashville, TN)
- Genre: Country pop
- Length: 3:32
- Label: Arista Nashville
- Songwriters: Carrie Underwood; Ashley Gorley; Kelley Lovelace
- Producer: Mark Bright

Carrie Underwood singles chronology
"So Small" (2007)	"All-American Girl" (2007)	"Last Name" (2008)

Music video
- "Carrie Underwood - All-American Girl (Official Video)" on YouTube

"All-American Girl" is a song composed by American country singer Carrie Underwood, Ashley Gorley and Kelley Lovelace. It is the second single from Underwood's second studio album, Carnival Ride, released in the United States on December 17, 2007.

== Background ==
"All-American Girl" is the second single for which Underwood shares a writing credit, the first being "So Small", which preceded it. The song is a mid-tempo country-pop song, with a soaring chorus. Underwood stated in an issue of Entertainment Weekly that the high note during the bridge in the song is the highest note she has ever hit (E5, or the E an octave above middle E).

== Content ==
The song centers around a "beautiful, wonderful, perfect all-American girl." The first verse tells the story of a father hoping for a baby boy to continue his legacy, but "when the nurse came in with a little pink blanket, all those big dreams changed". The baby girl has her father "wrapped around her finger", and his heart belongs to that "all-American girl." The second verse shifts to 16 years later when the girl is now a teenager who falls head-over-heels for the "senior football star." Just as with the girl's father, she becomes the center of the boy's world, despite opposition from his father and the school's football coach. The final bridge describes the girl and boy getting married and expecting "one of their own". When she asks the boy what he's hoping for he replies with "one just like you": an "all-American girl." Underwood said the song is partially autobiographical.

She wrote the song loosely based on the fact that she is the youngest of a family of three daughters, and ended up marrying a sports star (albeit in hockey). Underwood has worked as a vet and a waitress, entered pageants and was also a Sigma Sigma Sigma sorority member, all activities depicted in the music video.

== Music video ==
The music video, which premiered January 23, 2008, was another of Underwood's many videos directed by Roman White.

The video features several different scenes of Underwood in different outfits portraying what an All-American girl could be behind different backgrounds through a green screen.

Throughout the video she appeared as an American Olympic swimmer, a painter, a nurse, a photographer, a cowgirl, a waitress, a ballerina, a clothing designer, a chef, a cheerleader, a veterinarian, a beauty queen, a mother, a football player, a police officer, a teacher, a graduate, a college student (wearing a sweatshirt from Underwood's own sorority Sigma Sigma Sigma), a bride, a flight attendant, a news anchor, an astronaut, a firefighter, a soldier, a surgeon, a welder, a scientific chemist, a car thief and the President of the United States. In one scene, in a reference to Underwood's video for "Before He Cheats", she wears the same black leather jacket and sunglasses while holding a baseball bat, with the same smashed red pickup truck in the background (whenever the newswoman is shown, along the bottom screen can be seen a scrolling news ticker regarding the truck's destruction). Underwood is also shown performing in a green zip-up hoodie, jeans, and black pumps in an orange hall.

== Chart performance ==
The song reached number 27 on the Hot 100, becoming Underwood's seventh career Hot 100 top 40 single. "All-American Girl" debuted at number 58 on the country charts and has reached number one on Hot Country Songs and spent two weeks at the top, making it Underwood's fourth consecutive number one on that chart and fifth overall, her sixth consecutive number one country single overall, and her seventh number one single altogether. It is her first number one to spend less than three weeks at the top of the chart. As of 2015, "All-American Girl" sold 1,800,000 copies in the United States. The song has been certified 3× Platinum by the RIAA.

Chart (2007–2008)	Peak position
Canada (Canadian Hot 100)	45
Canada Country (Billboard)	1
US Billboard Hot 100	27
US Hot Country Songs (Billboard)	1

=== Year-end charts ===
Chart (2008)	Position
US Country Songs (Billboard)	24

== Awards ==
=== 2008 CMT Online Awards ===
Year	Nominee / work	Award	Result
2008	"All-American Girl"	Most-Streamed Country Song of the Year	Won

=== 2008 BMI Awards ===
Year	Nominee / work	Award	Result
2008	"All-American Girl"	Songwriter of the Year (Carrie Underwood)	Won

=== 2010 CMA Triple Play Awards ===
Year	Nominee / work	Award	Result
2010	"All-American Girl"	Triple-Play Songwriter (along with "So Small", "Last Name")	Won

== Certifications ==
Certifications for All-American Girl
Region	Certification	Certified units/sales
United States (RIAA)	3× Platinum	3,000,000^{‡}
^{‡} Sales+streaming figures based on certification alone.
