= List of songs written by Carrie Underwood =

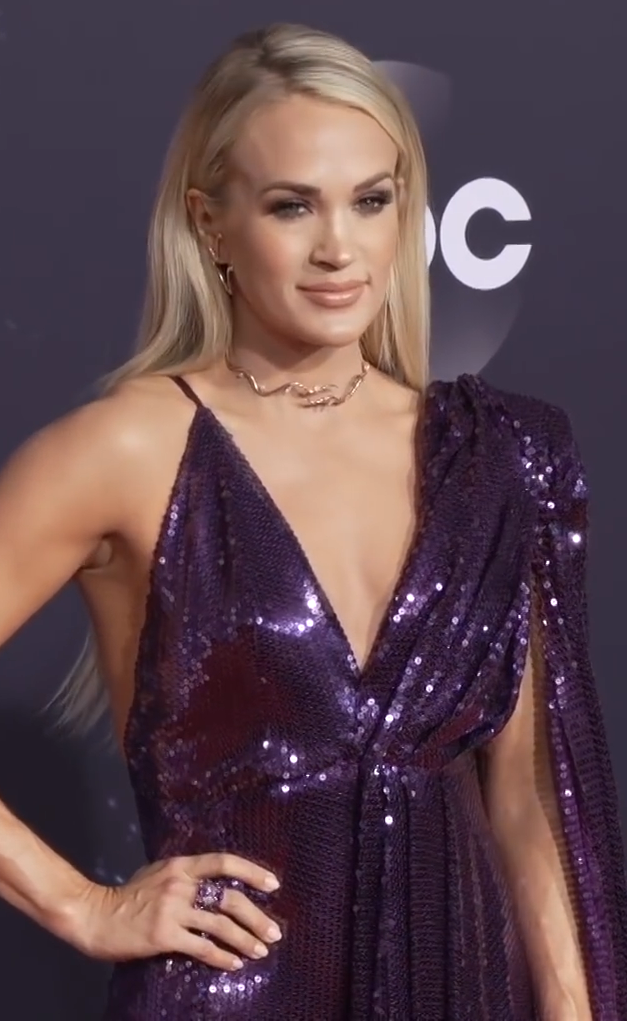
Underwood at the American Music Awards of 2019.

American country music singer Carrie Underwood has written songs on all nine of her albums, greatest hits albums and for other artists.

== Songs ==
Key
†	Indicates single release
#	Indicates promotional single release

List of songs written or co-written by Carrie Underwood
Song	Artist(s)	Writer(s)	Album	Year	Ref.
"All-American Girl" †	Carrie Underwood	Carrie Underwood; Ashley Gorley; Kelley Lovelace	Carnival Ride	2007	
"Backsliding"	Carrie Underwood	Carrie Underwood; Hillary Lindsey; David Garcia	Cry Pretty	2018	
"Burn"	Carrie Underwood	Carrie Underwood; Hillary Lindsey; Ashley Gorley; David Garcia	Denim & Rhinestones	2022	
"The Champion" †	Carrie Underwood; Ludacris	Carrie Underwood; Christopher Bridges; Chris DeStefano; Brett James	Cry Pretty	2018	
"Chaser"	Carrie Underwood	Carrie Underwood; Mike Elizondo; Hillary Lindsey	Storyteller	2015	
"Cowboy Casanova" †	Carrie Underwood	Carrie Underwood; Mike Elizondo; Brett James	Play On	2009	
"Cupid's Got a Shotgun"	Carrie Underwood	Carrie Underwood; Chris Tompkins; Josh Kear	Blown Away	2012	
"Crazy Angels"	Carrie Underwood	Carrie Underwood; Lydia Vaughan; David Garcia	Denim & Rhinestones	2022	
"Crazy Dreams"	Carrie Underwood	Carrie Underwood; Barry Dean; Troy Verges	Carnival Ride	2007	
"Cry Pretty" †	Carrie Underwood	Carrie Underwood; Hillary Lindsey; Liz Rose; Lori McKenna	Cry Pretty	2018	
"Denim & Rhinestones"	Carrie Underwood	Carrie Underwood; Hillary Lindsey; Josh Kear; David Garcia	Denim & Rhinestones	2022	
"Drinking Alone" †	Carrie Underwood	Carrie Underwood; David Garcia; Brett James	Cry Pretty	2018	
"Eighteen Inches" †	Lauren Alaina	Carrie Underwood; Kelley Lovelace; Ashley Gorley	Wildflower	2011	
"Faster"	Carrie Underwood	Carrie Underwood; Hillary Lindsey; David Garcia	Denim & Rhinestones	2022	
"Favorite Time of the Year"	Carrie Underwood	Carrie Underwood; Hillary Lindsey; Chris DeStefano	My Gift	2020	
"Game On"	Carrie Underwood	Carrie Underwood; Chris DeStefano Brett James	—	2018	
"Garden"	Carrie Underwood	Carrie Underwood; David Garcia; Josh Miller	Denim & Rhinestones	2022	
"The Girl You Think I Am"	Carrie Underwood	Carrie Underwood; David Hodges; Hillary Lindsey	Storyteller	2015	
"Good Enough for Me"	Jessica Harp	Carrie Underwood; Hillary Lindsey; Luke Laird	A Woman Needs	2010	
"Good Girl" †	Carrie Underwood	Carrie Underwood; Chris DeStefano; Ashley Gorley	Blown Away	2012	
"Good in Goodbye"	Carrie Underwood	Carrie Underwood; Hillary Lindsey; Ryan Tedder	Blown Away	2012	
"Hate My Heart" †	Carrie Underwood	Carrie Underwood; Hillary Lindsey; MichaelHardy; David Garcia	Denim & Rhinestones	2022	
"Heartbeat" †	Carrie Underwood	Carrie Underwood; Zach Crowell; Ashley Gorley	Storyteller	2015	
"I Ain't in Checotah Anymore"	Carrie Underwood	Carrie Underwood; Trey Bruce; Angelo Petraglia	Some Hearts	2005	
"I'll Be the DJ"	Julianne Hough	Carrie Underwood; Kelley Lovelace; Ashley Gorley	Wildfire (unreleased)	2011	
"Keep Us Safe" #	Carrie Underwood	Carrie Underwood; Hillary Lindsey; David Hodges; Shane McAnally	—	2014	
"Kingdom"	Carrie Underwood	Carrie Underwood; Chris DeStefano; Dave Barnes	Cry Pretty	2018	
"Last Name" †	Carrie Underwood	Carrie Underwood; Luke Laird; Hillary Lindsey	Carnival Ride	2007	
"Let There Be Peace"	Carrie Underwood	Carrie Underwood; Brett James; Dave Garcia	My Gift	2020	
"Little Girl Don't Grow Up Too Fast"	Carrie Underwood	Carrie Underwood; Chris DeStefano; Hillary Lindsey	Storyteller	2015	
"Little Toy Guns" †	Carrie Underwood	Carrie Underwood; Chris DeStefano; Hillary Lindsey	Greatest Hits: Decade#1	2014	
"Lord Help Me"	Bonnie Tyler	Carrie Underwood; Ashley Monroe; Katrina Elam	Rocks and Honey	2013	
"Love Wins" †	Carrie Underwood	Carrie Underwood; Dave Garciabr; Brett James	Cry Pretty	2018	
"Low"	Carrie Underwood	Carrie Underwood; Hillary Lindsey; David Garcia	Cry Pretty	2018	
"Mama's Song" †	Carrie Underwood	Carrie Underwood; Kara DioGuardi; Marti Frederiksen; Luke Laird	Play On	2009	
"Nobody Ever Told You"	Carrie Underwood	Carrie Underwood; Hillary Lindsay; Luke Laird	Blown Away	2012	
"Not Tonight"	Kristy Lee Cook	Carrie Underwood; Chris Lindsey; Brett James	Why Wait	2008	
"Oh Sunday, Night"	Carrie Underwood	Carrie Underwood; Chris DeStefano; Priscilla Renea; Brett James	—	2016	
"One Way Ticket"	Carrie Underwood	Carrie Underwood; Josh Kear; Luke Laird	Blown Away	2012	
"Out of That Truck" †	Carrie Underwood	Carrie Underwood; Lydia Vaughan; David Garcia	Denim & Rhinestones	2023	
"Pink Champagne"	Carrie Underwood	Carrie Underwood; Ashley Gorley; David Garcia	Denim & Rhinestones	2022	
"Play On"	Carrie Underwood	Carrie Underwood; Natalie Hemby; Luke Laird	Play On	2009	
"Poor Everybody Else"	Carrie Underwood	Carrie Underwood; Josh Miller; Chris DeStefano	Denim & Rhinestones	2022	
"Renegade Runaway"	Carrie Underwood	Carrie Underwood; Chris DeStefano; Hillary Lindsey	Storyteller	2015	
"See You Again" †	Carrie Underwood	Carrie Underwood; Hillary Lindsay; David Hodges	Blown Away	2012	
"She Don't Know"	Carrie Underwood	Carrie Underwood; Hillary Lindsey; David Garcia	Denim & Rhinestones	2022	
"Smoke Break" †	Carrie Underwood	Carrie Underwood; Chris DeStefano; Hillary Lindsey	Storyteller	2015	
"Something in the Water" †	Carrie Underwood	Carrie Underwood; Chris DeStefano; Brett James	Greatest Hits: Decade #1	2014	
"So Small" †	Carrie Underwood	Carrie Underwood; Luke Laird; Hillary Lindsey	Carnival Ride	2007	
"Southbound" †	Carrie Underwood	Carrie Underwood; David Garcia; Josh Miller	Cry Pretty	2018	
"Spinning Bottles"	Carrie Underwood	Carrie Underwood; Hillary Lindsey; Dave Garcia; Carol Oordt	Cry Pretty	2018	
"Stretchy Pants" #	Carrie Underwood	Carrie Underwood; Hillary Lindsey; Chris DeStefano	—	2021	
"Sweet Baby Jesus"	Carrie Underwood	Carrie Underwood; Brett James; Dave Garcia	My Gift	2020	
"Take Me Out"	Carrie Underwood	Carrie Underwood; Hillary Lindsey; David Garcia	Denim & Rhinestones	2023	
"Temporary Home" †	Carrie Underwood	Carrie Underwood; Luke Laird; Zac Maloy	Play On	2009	
"There's a Place for Us" †	Carrie Underwood	Carrie Underwood; Hillary Lindsey; David Hodges	The Chronicles of Narnia: The Voyage of the Dawn Treader	2010	
"Two Black Cadillacs" †	Carrie Underwood	Carrie Underwood; Hillary Lindsay; Josh Kear	Blown Away	2012	
"Unapologize"	Carrie Underwood	Carrie Underwood; Hillary Lindsey; Steve McEwan; Raine Maida; Chantal Kreviazuk	Play On	2009	
"Undo It" †	Carrie Underwood	Carrie Underwood; Kara DioGuardi; Marti Frederiksen; Luke Laird	Play On	2009	
"Velvet Heartbreak"	Carrie Underwood	Carrie Underwood; Hillary Lindsey; David Garcia	Denim & Rhinestones	2022	
"Wanted Woman"	Carrie Underwood	Carrie Underwood; David Garcia; Josh Miller	Denim & Rhinestones	2022	
"What Can I Say"	Carrie Underwood; Sons of Sylvia	Carrie Underwood; David Hodges; Steve McEwan	Play On	2009	
"What I Never Knew I Always Wanted"	Carrie Underwood	Carrie Underwood; Brett James; Hillary Lindsey	Storyteller	2015	
"Whine After Whiskey"	Carrie Underwood	Carrie Underwood; Tom Shapiro; Dave Berg	Blown Away	2012	
