= Cry Pretty Tour 360 =

2019 concert tour by Carrie Underwood

- Tour by Carrie Underwood
- Promotional poster for the tour
- Location: Europe; North America
- Associated album: Cry Pretty
- Start date: May 1, 2019
- End date: October 31, 2019
- Legs: 3
- No. of shows: 64

Carrie Underwood concert chronology
- Ripcord World Tour (2016); Cry Pretty Tour 360 (2019); Reflection (2021–2025)

The Cry Pretty Tour 360 was the sixth concert tour by American country music artist Carrie Underwood. The tour was in support of her sixth studio album Cry Pretty (2018), and began on May 1, 2019, in Greensboro, North Carolina and concluded on October 31, 2019, in Detroit, Michigan, playing 60 shows. It was also confirmed that $1 from every ticket sold would be donated to Danita's Children which helps children from Haiti.

== Background and development ==
Underwood announced the tour and opening acts through an online video posted on August 8, 2018, along with the announcement of her pregnancy stating this as the reason for the tour's delay. The tour is supported by Maddie & Tae and Runaway June. On March 4, 2019, Underwood announced UK dates revolving around an appearance at the Glastonbury Festival supported by The Shires.

== Reception ==
In July 2019, Billboard reported that Underwood could gross as much as $50 million from the tour, pointing out that almost "15 years into her career, Underwood's touring business continues to grow. Each of her six tours since 2006 have averaged a higher gross and attendance than the one before, including 2019's Cry Pretty Tour." The site also claimed the tour to have paced an average of $898,000 and 11,022 tickets per night.

Bob Mehr of Commercial Appeal applauded the show's pyrotechnics, but highlighted Underwood's voice, writing, "Despite all the showmanship, the real essence of Underwood — going all the way back to her breakthrough on American Idol nearly 15 years ago — is her voice, a uniquely thunderous mezzo soprano that has defined a generation of hits, from the opening "Southbound" to the concert capper "Love Wins"." Billy Dukes of Taste of Country wagered that the show might garner Underwood the CMA Entertainer of the Year award, writing, "The definition of "hit" is clearly changing. With some justice, the definition of "Entertainer of the Year" may soon be as well. It's not a man's world any longer. This is Carrie Underwood's EOTY tour." Holly Gleason of Pollstar praised Underwood's decision to bring an all-female lineup, writing, "While much discussion about a woman’s place in country music is happening, Underwood is walking instead of talking. Taking two young female acts on the road, she delivered an arena show that goes toe-to-toe with anyone in any genre, not just country, as a vocalist, as a show(wo)man, as the embodiment or realization of what the audience aspires to. And she does it in 5-inch heels." Bobby Olivier also praised Underwood's vocal delivery, saying, "But as with any of Underwood’s performances, dating back to her dominant run on “American Idol” in 2005, she was defined Wednesday by her overwhelming vocal ability — a titanic, relentless instrument rarely challenged by artists from any genre. She uses no backing track; it's just her, a nine-piece band (including one female background singer) and those propulsive pipes booming from the PA."

== Setlist ==
This setlist is representative of the show on May 1, 2019, in Greensboro. It may not represent all dates throughout the tour.

1. "Southbound"
2. "Cowboy Casanova"
3. "Good Girl"
4. "Last Name"
5. "Backsliding"
6. "Church Bells"
7. "Two Black Cadillacs"
8. "Blown Away"
9. "Drinking Alone"
10. "End Up With You"
11. "Flat on the Floor"
12. "Wasted"
13. "Temporary Home" / "See You Again" / "I Know You Won't" / "Just a Dream" / "Dream On"
14. "Jesus, Take the Wheel"
15. "The Bullet"
16. "Something in the Water"
17. "Low"
18. "Stand by Your Man" / "Walkin' After Midnight" / "Coal Miner's Daughter" / "9 to 5" / "Rockin' with the Rhythm of the Rain" / "She's in Love with the Boy" / "Independence Day" / "Wild One" / "Why Haven't I Heard from You" / "Man! I Feel Like a Woman!"
19. "Undo It"
20. "The Champion"
21. "Before He Cheats"
22. "Cry Pretty"
23. "Love Wins"

Notes

- For her performances at the Glastonbury Festival, the setlist consisted of: "Church Bells", "Cowboy Casanova", "Last Name", "Wasted", "Jesus, Take the Wheel", "Flat on the Floor", "Southbound", "Just a Dream/Dream On", "Love Wins", "Two Black Cadillacs", "Blown Away", "Cry Pretty", "Undo It", "Smoke Break" and "Before He Cheats".
- During the UK tour, "Backsliding" and the Women of Country medley were not performed.

== Tour dates ==
List of concerts, showing date, city, country, venue, opening acts, tickets sold, number of available tickets and amount of gross revenue
| Date | City | Country | Venue | Opening acts | Attendance | Revenue |
North America
| May 1, 2019 | Greensboro | United States | Greensboro Coliseum | Maddie & Tae; Runaway June | —N/a | —N/a |
| May 3, 2019 | Birmingham | United States | Legacy Arena | Maddie & Tae; Runaway June | —N/a | —N/a |
| May 4, 2019 | North Little Rock | United States | Verizon Arena | Maddie & Tae; Runaway June | 11,245 / 11,245 | $837,017 |
| May 6, 2019 | San Antonio | United States | AT&T Center | Maddie & Tae; Runaway June | —N/a | —N/a |
| May 9, 2019 | Phoenix | United States | Talking Stick Resort Arena | Maddie & Tae; Runaway June | 12,727 / 12,727 | $1,036,632 |
| May 11, 2019 | Las Vegas | United States | MGM Grand Garden Arena | Maddie & Tae; Runaway June | 9,584 / 9,584 | $876,378 |
| May 12, 2019 | Fresno | United States | Save Mart Center | Maddie & Tae; Runaway June | 8,833 / 8,833 | $706,999 |
| May 14, 2019 | Sacramento | United States | Golden 1 Center | Maddie & Tae; Runaway June | 12,154 / 12,154 | $1,001,994 |
| May 17, 2019 | Oakland | United States | Oracle Arena | Maddie & Tae; Runaway June | 5,839 / 8,075 | $458,986 |
| May 18, 2019 | Bakersfield | United States | Rabobank Arena | Maddie & Tae; Runaway June | —N/a | —N/a |
| May 21, 2019 | Portland | United States | Moda Center | Maddie & Tae; Runaway June | 12,437 / 12,437 | $997,252 |
| May 22, 2019 | Spokane | United States | Spokane Veterans Memorial Arena | Maddie & Tae; Runaway June | 10,566 / 10,566 | $868,056 |
| May 24, 2019 | Tacoma | United States | Tacoma Dome | Maddie & Tae; Runaway June | 12,898 / 12,898 | $1,035,772 |
| May 25, 2019 | Vancouver | Canada | Rogers Arena | Maddie & Tae; Runaway June | 9,792 / 9,792 | $600,916 |
| May 28, 2019 | Edmonton | Canada | Rogers Place | Maddie & Tae; Runaway June | 11,505 / 11,505 | $885,001 |
| May 30, 2019 | Fort McMurray | Canada | Shell Place | Maddie & Tae; Runaway June | 6,247 / 6,247 | $504,356 |
| May 31, 2019 | Saskatoon | Canada | SaskTel Centre | Maddie & Tae; Runaway June | 8,488 / 8,488 | $581,283 |
| June 2, 2019 | Winnipeg | Canada | Bell MTS Place | Maddie & Tae; Runaway June | 6,975 / 6,975 | $395,516 |
| June 10, 2019 | Ottawa | Canada | Canadian Tire Centre | Maddie & Tae; Runaway June | 8,823 / 8,823 | $650,929 |
| June 13, 2019 | Hershey | United States | Giant Center | Maddie & Tae; Runaway June | 9,991 / 9,991 | $851,546 |
| June 15, 2019 | Cincinnati | United States | U.S. Bank Arena | Maddie & Tae; Runaway June | 13,184 / 13,184 | $1,040,946 |
| June 16, 2019 | Indianapolis | United States | Bankers Life Fieldhouse | Maddie & Tae; Runaway June | 10,897 / 10,897 | $909,096 |
| June 18, 2019 | St. Louis | United States | Enterprise Center | Maddie & Tae; Runaway June | 11,477 / 11,477 | $901,721 |
| June 20, 2019 | Milwaukee | United States | Fiserv Forum | Maddie & Tae; Runaway June | 13,136 / 13,136 | $1,050,421 |
| June 21, 2019 | Minneapolis | United States | Target Center | Maddie & Tae; Runaway June | 14,281 / 14,281 | $1,129,680 |
| June 23, 2019 | Lincoln | United States | Pinnacle Bank Arena | Maddie & Tae; Runaway June | 11,016 / 11,016 | $855,701 |
Europe
| June 28, 2019 | Birmingham | England | Resorts World Arena | The Shires | 4,409 / 4,409 | $324,839 |
| June 29, 2019 (Note: The June 29, 2019, show is a part of the 2019 Glastonbury Festival.) | Somerset | England | Worthy Farm | —N/a | 135,000 | $329.15 |
| June 30, 2019 | Cardiff | Wales | Motorpoint Arena | The Shires | —N/a | —N/a |
| July 2, 2019 | Glasgow | Scotland | SSE Hydro | The Shires | 5,716 / 5,716 | $378,572 |
| July 3, 2019 | Manchester | England | Manchester Arena | The Shires | —N/a | —N/a |
| July 4, 2019 | London | England | Wembley Arena | The Shires | —N/a | —N/a |
North America
| July 6, 2019 (Note: The July 6, 2019, show is a part of the Cavendish Beach Music Festival.) | Cavendish | Canada | Cavendish Beach Music Festival | —N/a | —N/a | —N/a |
| September 10, 2019 | San Diego | United States | Pechanga Arena | Maddie & Tae; Runaway June | 7,112 / 7,112 | $548,771 |
| September 12, 2019 | Los Angeles | United States | Staples Center | Maddie & Tae; Runaway June | 14,494 / 14,494 | $1,041,637 |
| September 14, 2019 | Salt Lake City | United States | Vivint Smart Home Arena | Maddie & Tae; Runaway June | 12,256 / 12,256 | $946,273 |
| September 16, 2019 | Denver | United States | Pepsi Center | Maddie & Tae; Runaway June | 12,850 / 12,850 | $1,093,093 |
| September 18, 2019 | Wichita | United States | Intrust Bank Arena | Maddie & Tae; Runaway June | 13,466 / 13,466 | $544,323 |
| September 19, 2019 | Kansas City | United States | Sprint Center | Maddie & Tae; Runaway June | 12,667 / 12,667 | $866,677 |
| September 21, 2019 | Houston | United States | Toyota Center | Maddie & Tae; Runaway June | 12,069 / 12,069 | $805,197 |
| September 22, 2019 | Lafayette | United States | Cajundome | Maddie & Tae; Runaway June | 11,564 / 11,564 | $837,706 |
| September 24, 2019 | Dallas | United States | American Airlines Center | Maddie & Tae; Runaway June | 13,969 / 13,969 | $1,045,579 |
| September 25, 2019 | Oklahoma City | United States | Chesapeake Energy Arena | Maddie & Tae; Runaway June | 11,632 / 11,632 | $848,747 |
| September 27, 2019 | Nashville | United States | Bridgestone Arena | Maddie & Tae; Runaway June | 16,340 / 16,340 | $1,320,866 |
| September 29, 2019 | Columbia | United States | Colonial Life Arena | Maddie & Tae; Runaway June | 14,287 / 14,287 | $881,080 |
| September 30, 2019 | Raleigh | United States | PNC Arena | Maddie & Tae; Runaway June | 12,289 / 13,374 | $858,151 |
| October 2, 2019 | New York City | United States | Madison Square Garden | Maddie & Tae; Runaway June | 17,815 / 17,815 | $1,362,263 |
| October 4, 2019 | Washington, D.C. | United States | Capital One Arena | Maddie & Tae; Runaway June | 11,446 / 11,446 | $971,317 |
| October 5, 2019 | Philadelphia | United States | Wells Fargo Center | Maddie & Tae; Runaway June | 14,548 / 14,548 | $1,166,794 |
| October 9, 2019 | Ledyard | United States | MGM Grand Theater | Maddie & Tae; Runaway June | 2,585 / 2,585 | $228,299 |
| October 10, 2019 | Boston | United States | TD Garden | Maddie & Tae; Runaway June | 15,692 / 15,692 | $1,263,644 |
| October 12, 2019 | Pittsburgh | United States | PPG Paints Arena | Maddie & Tae; Runaway June | 13,237 / 13,237 | $1,023,889 |
| October 13, 2019 | Buffalo | United States | KeyBank Center | Maddie & Tae; Runaway June | 12,899 / 12,899 | $1,038,947 |
| October 14, 2019 (Note: The concert on October 14, 2019, at Scotiabank Arena in Toronto was originally scheduled to take place on June 9, 2019, but was rescheduled due to scheduling conflicts with the NBA Finals.) | Toronto | Canada | Scotiabank Arena | Maddie & Tae; Runaway June | 14,339 / 14,339 | $1,067,993 |
| October 16, 2019 | Cleveland | United States | Rocket Mortgage FieldHouse | Maddie & Tae; Runaway June | 9,628 / 9,628 | $759,707 |
| October 17, 2019 | Louisville | United States | KFC Yum! Center | Maddie & Tae; Runaway June | 10,188 / 11,755 | $816,087 |
| October 19, 2019 | Atlanta | United States | State Farm Arena | Maddie & Tae; Runaway June | 14,296 / 14,296 | $1,175,180 |
| October 20, 2019 | Jacksonville | United States | VyStar Veterans Memorial Arena | Maddie & Tae; Runaway June | 11,768 / 11,768 | $952,675 |
| October 23, 2019 | Memphis | United States | FedExForum | Maddie & Tae; Runaway June | 6,594 / 6,594 | $537,558 |
| October 24, 2019 | Tulsa | United States | BOK Center | Maddie & Tae; Runaway June | 10,072 / 11,415 | $830,247 |
| October 26, 2019 | Des Moines | United States | Wells Fargo Arena | Maddie & Tae; Runaway June | 12,602 / 12,602 | $1,001,544 |
| October 27, 2019 | Sioux Falls | United States | Denny Sanford Premier Center | Maddie & Tae; Runaway June | 10,722 / 10,722 | $916,030 |
| October 29, 2019 | Chicago | United States | United Center | Maddie & Tae; Runaway June | 10,935 / 10,935 | $939,546 |
| October 31, 2019 | Detroit | United States | Little Caesars Arena | Maddie & Tae; Runaway June | 11,298 / 11,298 | $918,332 |
| Total | | | | | 617,879 / 624,110 (99%) | $47,487,761 |
