= Storyteller Tour: Stories in the Round =

2016 concert tour by Carrie Underwood

- Tour by Carrie Underwood
- Promotional poster for the tour
- Location: North America; Europe
- Associated album: Storyteller
- Start date: January 30, 2016
- End date: November 28, 2016
- Legs: 4
- No. of shows: 87 in North America; 5 in Europe; 92 Total
- Box office: $56,804,491

Carrie Underwood concert chronology
- Blown Away Tour (2012–13); Storyteller Tour: Stories in the Round (2016); Ripcord World Tour (2016)

The Storyteller Tour: Stories in the Round was the fifth headlining concert tour from American country music artist Carrie Underwood. The tour is in support of her fifth studio album Storyteller (2015) and began on January 30, 2016, in Jacksonville, Florida. It concluded on November 28, 2016, after 92 shows. For the shows in the United States, $1 from each ticket sold will be donated to Underwood's C.A.T S. Foundation. This was her first tour in three years. The tour sold over 1.2 million tickets during its run. By June, 2016, Billboard had named the number-one country tour of the first half of the year.

Underwood released a concert film, Carrie Underwood: The Storyteller Tour - Stories in the Round, on November 17, 2017.

== Background ==
News of the tour was first mentioned in a Rolling Stone interview in September 2015. The tour was officially announced on October 27, 2015, via Underwood's Official Fan Club website. "Stories in the Round" comes from this being Underwood's first tour where the stage is 360 degrees and in the middle of the arena floor. Underwood shares her excitement for the tour stating;

I can't wait to play new music from Storyteller for the fans. I am so blessed to have this career and get to do the things I do, but there is nothing like that moment when I get to step onto the stage to sing and all the fans are singing along with me.

The second leg was announced on March 31, 2016.

== Concert synopsis ==
Moments before the show starts AC/DC's "Back in Black" is played. Then the lighting structure above the stage descends to the floor of center stage where Underwood and her band emerge. She starts off with "Renegade Runaway" a new track off Storyteller followed by "Last Name" that contains bits of her duet with Miranda Lambert, "Somethin' Bad". The setlist consists of new and past favorites, and covers. For the encore she closes with "Smoke Break" and "Something in the Water".

=== Stage design and production ===
The 360 degree center stage of three circles is equipped with movable parts that allows Underwood and her band access to below the stage where they can change outfits or swap out instruments. The three tier lighting structure displays lyrics and colors and moves, rotates, and twists. In addition there are sparkles, fireworks, lasers, smoke and explosions, and a big light show. Underwood's goal was to harmonica for "Choctaw County Affair", which she reached. Drums were added during "Church Bells" in the fall leg.

== Opening acts ==
- Easton Corbin & The Swon Brothers (North America)
- Lauren Alaina, Jill Johnson & Pauper Kings (Europe)
- Little Big Town, Sam Hunt & Maddie & Tae (UK & Ireland)

== Setlist ==
The following setlist is from the January 30 show in Jacksonville, Florida. It is not intended to represent all dates throughout the tour.

1. "Renegade Runaway"
2. "Last Name" / "Somethin' Bad"
3. "Undo It"
4. "Good Girl"
5. "Church Bells"
6. "Cowboy Casanova"
7. "Heartbeat"
8. "Jesus, Take the Wheel"
9. "Wasted"
10. "Blown Away"
11. "Two Black Cadillacs"
12. "Dirty Laundry"
13. "Choctaw County Affair"
14. "I Will Always Love You"
15. "What I Never Knew I Always Wanted"
16. "Fishin' in the Dark" (with Easton Corbin and The Swon Brothers)
17. "Clock Don't Stop"
18. "All-American Girl"
19. "Little Toy Guns"
20. "Before He Cheats"

Encore

21. "Smoke Break"
22. "Something in the Water"

Notes

- From March 4 to 16, "What I Never Knew I Always Wanted", "All American Girl", and "Fishin' in the Dark" were temporarily cut from the set list. Additionally, "Flat on the Floor" and "Chaser" were temporarily added.
- Starting on August 31, a cover of Alabama's "Mountain Music" replaced "Fishin' in the Dark".

== Tour dates ==
List of concerts, showing date, city, country, venue, opening acts, tickets sold, number of available tickets and amount of gross revenue
Date	City	Country	Venue	Opening acts	Attendance	Revenue
North America Leg 1
January 30, 2016	Jacksonville	United States	Jacksonville Veterans Memorial Arena	Easton Corbin; The Swon Brothers	13,581 / 13,581	$865,536
February 1, 2016	Duluth	United States	Infinite Energy Arena	Easton Corbin; The Swon Brothers	11,574 / 11,574	$776,244
February 3, 2016	Greensboro	United States	Greensboro Coliseum	Easton Corbin; The Swon Brothers	10,760 / 10,760	$727,460
February 5, 2016	Louisville	United States	KFC Yum! Center	Easton Corbin; The Swon Brothers	13,613 / 13,613	$897,128
February 17, 2016	Pittsburgh	United States	Consol Energy Center	Easton Corbin; The Swon Brothers	11,768 / 11,768	$797,198
February 20, 2016	Hampton	United States	Hampton Coliseum	Easton Corbin; The Swon Brothers	10,277 / 10,277	$680,672
February 22, 2016	Philadelphia	United States	Wells Fargo Center	Easton Corbin; The Swon Brothers	12,562 / 12,562	$867,962
February 23, 2016	Boston	United States	TD Garden	Easton Corbin; The Swon Brothers	16,786 / 16,786	$1,076,169
February 25, 2016	Washington, D.C.	United States	Verizon Center	Easton Corbin; The Swon Brothers	13,124 / 13,124	$899,315
Europe
March 4, 2016^{[A]}	Stockholm	Sweden	Hovet	Lauren Alaina; Jill Johnson; Pauper Kings	—N/a	—N/a
March 5, 2016^{[A]}	Oslo	Norway	Oslo Spektrum	Lauren Alaina; Jill Johnson; Pauper Kings	—N/a	—N/a
March 11, 2016^{[A]}	Glasgow	Scotland	Clyde Auditorium	Little Big Town; Sam Hunt; Maddie & Tae	5,842 / 5,985	$742,990
March 12, 2016^{[A]}	London	England	The O_{2} Arena	Little Big Town; Sam Hunt; Maddie & Tae	36,152 / 50,832	$3,516,500
March 13, 2016^{[A]}	Dublin	Ireland	3Arena	Little Big Town; Sam Hunt; Maddie & Tae	—N/a	—N/a
North America Leg 2
March 17, 2016	Youngstown	United States	Covelli Centre	Easton Corbin; The Swon Brothers	6,645 / 6,645	$492,360
March 19, 2016	Allentown	United States	PPL Center	Easton Corbin; The Swon Brothers	9,012 / 9,012	$629,892
March 22, 2016	Auburn Hills	United States	The Palace of Auburn Hills	Easton Corbin; The Swon Brothers	13,771 / 13,771	$892,996
March 24, 2016	St. Louis	United States	Chaifetz Arena	Easton Corbin; The Swon Brothers	9,626 / 9,626	$666,656
March 26, 2016	Lincoln	United States	Pinnacle Bank Arena	Easton Corbin; The Swon Brothers	14,964 / 14,964	$904,074
March 29, 2016	Colorado Springs	United States	Broadmoor World Arena	Easton Corbin; The Swon Brothers	7,935 / 7,935	$542,490
March 30, 2016	Denver	United States	Pepsi Center	Easton Corbin; The Swon Brothers	12,830 / 12,830	$841,100
April 1, 2016^{[B]}	Las Vegas	United States	Las Vegas Festival Grounds	—N/a	—N/a	—N/a
April 5, 2016	Fresno	United States	Save Mart Center	Easton Corbin; The Swon Brothers	9,534 / 9,534	$676,344
April 8, 2016	Reno	United States	Reno Events Center	Easton Corbin; The Swon Brothers	6,234 / 6,234	$475,939
April 10, 2016	Oakland	United States	Oracle Arena	Easton Corbin; The Swon Brothers	9,775 / 10,375	$715,339
April 12, 2016	Stockton	United States	Stockton Arena	Easton Corbin; The Swon Brothers	8,145 / 9,109	$552,900
April 14, 2016	Phoenix	United States	Talking Stick Resort Arena	Easton Corbin; The Swon Brothers	12,815 / 12,815	$829,160
April 16, 2016	Las Cruces	United States	Pan American Center	Easton Corbin; The Swon Brothers	10,582 / 10,582	$687,352
April 18, 2016	San Antonio	United States	AT&T Center	Easton Corbin; The Swon Brothers	9,918 / 10,666	$690,558
April 22, 2016	Bossier City	United States	CenturyLink Center	Easton Corbin; The Swon Brothers	10,883 / 10,883	$737,228
April 24, 2016	Lafayette	United States	Cajundome	Easton Corbin; The Swon Brothers	9,474 / 10,089	$615,582
April 25, 2016^{[C]}	Houston	United States	Toyota Center	Easton Corbin; The Swon Brothers	9,684 / 10,624	$677,934
April 27, 2016	Tulsa	United States	BOK Center	Easton Corbin; The Swon Brothers	14,627 / 14,627	$915,842
April 28, 2016	North Little Rock	United States	Verizon Arena	Easton Corbin; The Swon Brothers	9,171 / 9,171	$635,166
April 30, 2016^{[D]}	Indio	United States	Empire Polo Club	Lee Ann Womack; Chris Stapleton; The Band Perry	—N/a	—N/a
May 3, 2016	Madison	United States	Kohl Center	Easton Corbin; The Swon Brothers	11,886 / 11,886	$773,376
May 5, 2016	Green Bay	United States	Resch Center	Easton Corbin; The Swon Brothers	9,358 / 9,358	$651,358
May 7, 2016	Grand Forks	United States	Ralph Engelstad Arena	Easton Corbin; The Swon Brothers	11,205 / 11,205	$721,680
May 10, 2016	Casper	United States	Casper Events Center	Easton Corbin; The Swon Brothers	6,395 / 7,507	$435,500
May 12, 2016	Billings	United States	Rimrock Auto Arena	Easton Corbin; The Swon Brothers	8,771 / 9,855	$612,026
May 15, 2016	Kansas City	United States	Sprint Center	Easton Corbin; The Swon Brothers	12,131 / 12,131	$815,966
May 17, 2016	Rosemont	United States	Allstate Arena	Easton Corbin; The Swon Brothers	15,761 / 15,761	$1,028,181
May 18, 2016	Cleveland	United States	Quicken Loans Arena	Easton Corbin; The Swon Brothers	12,270 / 12,270	$815,190
May 24, 2016	Buffalo	United States	First Niagara Center	Easton Corbin; The Swon Brothers	14,355 / 14,355	$907,410
May 27, 2016	Ottawa	Canada	Canadian Tire Centre	Easton Corbin; The Swon Brothers	10,467 / 10,467	$713,228
May 28, 2016	Toronto	Canada	Air Canada Centre	Easton Corbin; The Swon Brothers	17,499 / 17,499	$1,121,200
May 30, 2016	London	Canada	Budweiser Gardens	Easton Corbin; The Swon Brothers	9,628 / 9,628	$632,121
June 10, 2016^{[E]}	Nashville	United States	Nissan Stadium	—N/a	—N/a	—N/a
June 18, 2016^{[F]}	Cadott	United States	Chippewa Valley Festival Grounds	—N/a	—N/a	—N/a
July 22, 2016^{[G]}	Monticello	United States	Great Jones County Fairgrounds	—N/a	—N/a	—N/a
July 29, 2016^{[H]}	Sweet Home	United States	Oregon Jamboree	—N/a	—N/a	—N/a
July 30, 2016^{[I]}	Duncan	Canada	Cowichan Valley	—N/a	—N/a	—N/a
July 31, 2016^{[J]}	Camrose	Canada	Camrose Camping Grounds	—N/a	—N/a	—N/a
North America Leg 3
August 31, 2016	Anchorage	United States	Alaska Airlines Center	Easton Corbin; The Swon Brothers	4,304 / 4,304	$504,280
September 4, 2016	Spokane	United States	Spokane Veterans Memorial Arena	Easton Corbin; The Swon Brothers	11,389 / 11,389	$727,474
September 6, 2016	Boise	United States	Taco Bell Arena	Easton Corbin; The Swon Brothers	8,276 / 9,476	$547,292
September 8, 2016	Seattle	United States	KeyArena	Easton Corbin; The Swon Brothers	9,905 / 10,448	$681,068
September 10, 2016	San Jose	United States	SAP Center	Easton Corbin; The Swon Brothers	8,335 / 8,819	$606,713
September 13, 2016	Bakersfield	United States	Rabobank Arena	Easton Corbin; The Swon Brothers	7,910 / 8,652	$548,570
September 14, 2016	Los Angeles	United States	Staples Center	Easton Corbin; The Swon Brothers	13,274 / 13,274	$921,093
September 16, 2016	San Diego	United States	Valley View Casino Center	Easton Corbin; The Swon Brothers	7,216 / 8,140	$517,752
September 20, 2016	Dallas	United States	American Airlines Center	Easton Corbin; The Swon Brothers	13,271 / 13,271	$888,335
September 22, 2016	Nashville	United States	Bridgestone Arena	Easton Corbin; The Swon Brothers	14,005 / 14,005	$932,078
September 24, 2016	Columbia	United States	Colonial Life Arena	Easton Corbin; The Swon Brothers	11,350 / 11,350	$750,190
September 26, 2016	Roanoke	United States	Berglund Center	Easton Corbin; The Swon Brothers	5,350 / 6,034	$372,960
September 28, 2016	Providence	United States	Dunkin' Donuts Center	Easton Corbin; The Swon Brothers	7,805 / 8,988	$574,178
September 29, 2016	Manchester	United States	SNHU Arena	Easton Corbin; The Swon Brothers	8,843 / 9,727	$615,059
October 1, 2016	Hershey	United States	Giant Center	Easton Corbin; The Swon Brothers	10,560 / 10,560	$716,610
October 4, 2016	Indianapolis	United States	Bankers Life Fieldhouse	Easton Corbin; The Swon Brothers	7,768 / 7,768	$573,156
October 5, 2016	Milwaukee	United States	BMO Harris Bradley Center	Easton Corbin; The Swon Brothers	6,685 / 6,685	$493,238
October 7, 2016	Des Moines	United States	Wells Fargo Arena	Easton Corbin; The Swon Brothers	12,451 / 12,451	$845,735
October 8, 2016	Sioux Falls	United States	Denny Sanford Premier Center	Easton Corbin; The Swon Brothers	11,472 / 11,472	$796,824
October 11, 2016	Saskatoon	Canada	SaskTel Centre	Easton Corbin; The Swon Brothers	9,287 / 9,287	$682,138
October 13, 2016	Edmonton	Canada	Rogers Place	Easton Corbin; The Swon Brothers	9,776 / 9,776	$747,337
October 15, 2016	Winnipeg	Canada	MTS Centre	Easton Corbin; The Swon Brothers	10,187 / 10,187	$770,159
October 17, 2016	Saint Paul	United States	Xcel Energy Center	Easton Corbin; The Swon Brothers	14,714 / 14,714	$961,143
October 20, 2016	Cincinnati	United States	U.S. Bank Arena	Easton Corbin; The Swon Brothers	11,332 / 11,332	$756,382
October 22, 2016	Charlottesville	United States	John Paul Jones Arena	Easton Corbin; The Swon Brothers	7,834 / 7,834	$562,593
October 23, 2016	Charlotte	United States	Spectrum Center	Easton Corbin; The Swon Brothers	7,121 / 7,121	$533,150
October 25, 2016	New York City	United States	Madison Square Garden	Easton Corbin; The Swon Brothers	17,815 / 17,815	$1,362,263
October 27, 2016	Albany	United States	Times Union Center	Easton Corbin; The Swon Brothers	9,904 / 9,904	$673,774
October 28, 2016	Uncasville	United States	Mohegan Sun Arena	Easton Corbin; The Swon Brothers	6,338 / 6,338	$481,120
November 6, 2016	Hamilton	Canada	FirstOntario Centre	Easton Corbin; The Swon Brothers	9,077 / 10,317	$662,273
November 9, 2016	Rockford	United States	BMO Harris Bank Center	Easton Corbin; The Swon Brothers	6,600 / 6,866	$492,870
November 11, 2016	Evansville	United States	Ford Center	Easton Corbin; The Swon Brothers	9,886 / 9,886	$696,117
November 13, 2016	Memphis	United States	FedExForum	Easton Corbin; The Swon Brothers	9,321 / 10,201	$643,656
November 14, 2016	Birmingham	United States	Legacy Arena	Easton Corbin; The Swon Brothers	11,475 / 11,475	$749,490
November 16, 2016	Tampa	United States	Amalie Arena	Easton Corbin; The Swon Brothers	13,271 / 13,271	$891,365
November 17, 2016	Sunrise	United States	BB&T Center	Easton Corbin; The Swon Brothers	10,340 / 10,340	$738,990
November 22, 2016	Wichita	United States	Intrust Bank Arena	Easton Corbin; The Swon Brothers	10,000 / 10,747	$711,720
November 23, 2016	Oklahoma City	United States	Chesapeake Energy Arena	Easton Corbin; The Swon Brothers	11,306 / 11,912	$798,117
November 26, 2016	Las Vegas	United States	T-Mobile Arena	Easton Corbin; The Swon Brothers	9,794 / 10,633	$699,513
November 28, 2016	West Valley City	United States	Maverik Center	Easton Corbin; The Swon Brothers	10,738 / 10,738	$761,211
Total					887,675 / 919,783 (97%)	$58,814,104

List of festivals and other miscellaneous performances, rescheduling
^{A} These concerts were a part of C2C: Country to Country.
^{B} This concert is a part of the ACM Party for a Cause Festival.
^{C} The Houston concert was supposed to take place on April 19, but was rescheduled to April 25 due to severe weather.
^{D} This concert is a part of the Stagecoach Festival.
^{E} This concert is a part of the CMA Music Festival.
^{F} This concert is a part of the Country Fest 30th Anniversary.
^{G} This concert is a part of the Great Jones Country Fair.
^{H} This concert is a part of the Oregon Jamboree.
^{I} This concert is a part of the Sunfest Country Music Festival.
^{J} This concert is a part of the Big Valley Jamboree.

== Reception ==
In November 2016, Billboard reported the tour to have earned around $54.6 million with 800,000 tickets sold, with four more shows that had not been added to that total. This marked The Storyteller Tour as Underwood's highest-grossing tour to date. According to a document from The Smoking Gun, Underwood was contracted to earn $500,000 per show.

Scott Mervis of the Pittsburgh Post-Gazette says, "As she's not much of a talker, this was not a "Storyteller" tour in the sense of narrating the show with stories. She let the music and character-driven lyrics do most of the talking, at max volume." Tampa Bay Times's Jay Cridlin said that Underwood packed "nearly two dozen hits into an overpowering set that felt a whole more like arena rock than a country bar." Also, "Underwood alone remains the one with the voice and ambition to go full pop star, unleashing the full force of her roaring band and singing like a woman ready to take the wheel back from Jesus."

Serene Dominic of The Arizona Republic gave a negative review of the show, criticizing the big-production take on Underwood's songs, writing, "You couldn't call a show with Super Bowl halftime show production values "intimate." Maybe the anecdotes wouldn't have been that revealing from an artist like Underwood, who rarely writes a song without two other people in the parenthesis with her (not a knock, but the talk would've probably been more industry insider than the average audience would want to hear)." Jay Lustig gave a similarly negative review, criticizing Underwood waving at fans during the darker songs, writing, "Proving, perhaps, that you can take the singer out of American Idol but you can't take the American Idol out of the singer, she used, throughout the show, a bit of showbiz shtick that she really should lose: A cheerful wave to an audience member in the middle of a verse or chorus. She did this even on songs that were about heartbreak, or cheating men. I know it was just a little thing, but I found it jarring, nearly every time she did it."
