= Drinking Alone =

2019 song by Carrie Underwood

Single by Carrie Underwood

from the album Cry Pretty
- Released: October 28, 2019
- Genre: Country
- Length: 4:20 (album version); 3:50 (single version)
- Label: Capitol Nashville
- Songwriters: Carrie Underwood; David Garcia; Brett James
- Producers: Carrie Underwood; David Garcia

Carrie Underwood singles chronology
"Southbound" (2019)	"Drinking Alone" (2019)	"Hallelujah" (2020)

Music video
- "Carrie Underwood - Drinking Alone (Official Music Video)" on YouTube

"Drinking Alone" is a song co-written and recorded by American singer Carrie Underwood, and released as the fourth single from her sixth studio album, Cry Pretty (2018). The single had an official release day of October 28, 2019. The song was written by Underwood, co-producer David Garcia and Brett James.

== Writing and composition ==
Written by Underwood, co-producer David Garcia, and Brett James, the song centers around a bar encounter between a woman and a man after each of their respective relationships have just ended. Because the song was written from the first person narrative, Underwood was adamant that the characters in the song not have a one-night stand, and instead drink at the bar. "It was important to me because we're singing this [in the] first person", Underwood said of the song. She explained, "I didn't want it to be like, 'Oh, we're going to get drunk and go home together', because that's not something that I would do."

== Critical reception ==
"Drinking Alone" was met with mostly positive reviews. Taste of Country reviewed the song favorably, saying, "Underwood's new single brings with it a subtle maturity that's important for her music moving forward. This fourth single from her Cry Pretty album is her most believable, relatable tableau to date." They concluded the review by saying, "the Underwood, Brett James and David Garcia lyric isn't a bop, so it shouldn't sound like one. It's an arrangement as dynamic as the song and both stretch her creatively further than any single radio release has, since she introduced herself on television in 2005."

Upon their review of the album, Consequence of Sound noted "Drinking Alone" as the best song on the album, saying "her voice carries pain, longing, and self-disgust," and mentioned it alongside "Love Wins" and "The Bullet" as the essential tracks on the album.

Kyle's Korner gave a negative review, however, writing, "'Drinking Alone' is the equivalent of taking three different jigsaw puzzles and trying to mash all their pieces together, and nothing ends up fitting together. The sound is too dark and polished, the writing is confusing as all get-out, and Carrie Underwood brings a ton of swagger and attitude to the table that is neither necessary nor helpful."

== Commercial performance ==
In the United States, "Drinking Alone" debuted at number 50 on the Billboard Country Airplay chart and number 49 on the Hot Country Songs chart for the week ending November 16, 2019. It peaked at number 11 and number 17 on each chart respectively, becoming only the second single of her career to miss the top ten on both charts, with the other being "Love Wins", the album's second single. On the Billboard Hot 100, it peaked at number 74.

As of July 2020, "Drinking Alone" is certified Gold by the RIAA.

== Music video ==
The official music video for the single was released November 20, 2019. The video was directed by Randee St. Nicholas. The actor in the video is Jared Koronkiewicz. Underwood won two CMT Music Awards for the video in October 2020.

== Live performances ==
The song was performed by Underwood on her Cry Pretty Tour 360. Underwood gave the debut televised performance of the song at the 53rd Annual Country Music Association Awards in Nashville. She gave an acoustic performance of the song from her home for the television special ACM Presents: Our Country. In April 2020, she gave another acoustic performance of the song for SiriusXM The Highway's "Stagecouch Weekend," on account of Stagecoach Festival being postponed to October.

== Versions ==
The album version of the song is four minutes, twenty seconds, while the single version of the song (sent to radio) is three minutes, fifty seconds, with much of the intro and outro of the album version cut. The album version is used for the song's music video.

== Charts ==
=== Weekly charts ===
Chart (2019–2020)	Peak position
Australia Country Hot 50 (TMN)	14
Canada Country (Billboard)	30
US Billboard Hot 100	74
US Country Airplay (Billboard)	11
US Hot Country Songs (Billboard)	17

=== Year-end charts ===
Chart (2020)	Position
US Country Airplay (Billboard)	56
US Hot Country Songs (Billboard)	66

== Certifications ==
Region	Certification	Certified units/sales
United States (RIAA)	Gold	500,000^{‡}
^{‡} Sales+streaming figures based on certification alone.

== Awards and nominations ==
=== CMT Music Awards ===
Year	Nominee / work	Award	Result
2020	"Drinking Alone"	Video of the Year	Won
2020	"Drinking Alone"	Female Video of the Year	Won
