= Church Bells (song) =

Single by Carrie Underwood

from the album Storyteller
- Released: April 11, 2016
- Recorded: 2015
- Genre: Country pop
- Length: 3:13
- Label: Arista Nashville
- Songwriters: Zach Crowell; Brett James; Hillary Lindsey
- Producer: Mark Bright

Carrie Underwood singles chronology
"Chaser" (2016)	"Church Bells" (2016)	"Dirty Laundry" (2016)

Music video
- "Church Bells" on YouTube

"Church Bells" is a song recorded by American singer and songwriter Carrie Underwood from her fifth studio album, Storyteller. The song was written by Zach Crowell, Brett James, and Hillary Lindsey, with production from Mark Bright, and was released as the fourth single from the album, being shipped to radio on April 3, 2016, and had an official impact date of April 11, 2016.

"Church Bells" topped the Billboard Country Airplay chart, becoming Underwood's 15th leader on that chart and thereby extending her record as the female artist with most number-ones in history of that chart. It is her second number one from Storyteller on the Country Airplay chart. Underwood became the first woman in 2016 to have two number-ones on the chart. The song was certified 2× Platinum by the RIAA on July 23, 2020.

The song was nominated for Best Country Solo Performance at the 59th Grammy Awards.

== Content ==
Church Bells tells the story of Jenny, a poor girl who marries a rich oilman. However, she soon discovers her new husband is an abusive alcoholic. Jenny slips an untraceable poison into his drink and kills him.

Underwood said of the song, "It's...like Fancy's little sister", referencing Bobbie Gentry's hit song "Fancy", made famous by Reba McEntire. “She’s young, she’s pretty, she’s poor, doing what she can to survive,” Underwood explains, describing her “Church Bells” heroine. “(She) meets a man that has a lot of wealth and is supposed to take care of her.”

== Critical reception ==
The song received generally positive reviews. In their review of the album, Billboard said of the song, "The first half holds a pair of Southern-gothic blockbusters that are the closest she has come to channeling McEntire’s down-home storytelling: “Choctaw County Affair,” a tale of lovers silencing their would-be blackmailer, and “Church Bells,” a rags-to-riches murder ballad in which a woman quietly offs her abusive husband." Rolling Stone called it "the most epic domestic-violence-revenge-murder ballad in years" and that it "split the difference between Martina McBride's "Independence Day" and the Dixie Chicks "Goodbye Earl", but without the latter's safety-valve of humor."

In a mixed review, website Taste of Country said, "on “Church Bells” Underwood injects new drama into an oft-told tale. The Dixie Chicks “Goodbye Earl” relies on the same plot points, with Earl's fate being the same as the oil baron in this song". The review was concluded by saying "expect the song to perform well on country radio, even if it’s not one that pushes her artistry forward as much as others on her most recent studio album".

== Commercial performance ==
"Church Bells" first charted at number 49 on the Hot Country Songs chart, selling 2,300 copies following the release of the parent album. It fell off the chart in the following week. After its release as the third official single and following Underwood's performance at the 51st Annual Academy of Country Music Awards, the song re-entered the Hot Country Songs chart at number 34 and peaked at number two, spending three consecutive weeks at that spot. It debuted at number 50 on the US Country Airplay chart and peaked at number one, becoming Underwood's 15th number one on that chart and extending her record for most number ones among women on that chart. Underwood became the first female artist of 2016 to have two number one hits on the Country Airplay chart, with "Heartbeat" and "Church Bells".

For the week ending May 28, 2016, it debuted at number 90 on the Billboard Hot 100 chart and peaked at number 43.

In Canada, the song debuted at number 37 on the Canada Country chart and peaked at number two and debuted at number 100 on the Canadian Hot 100 chart and peaked at number 64.

The song has been certified 3× Platinum by the RIAA on October 30, 2025. As of January 2017, it has sold 456,000 copies in the United States.

== Music video ==
The music video for the single was filmed during the Storyteller Tour in Lincoln, Nebraska. The music video was released on May 10, 2016, and premiered on Good Morning America.

== Live performances ==
Underwood first performed the song live on the first stop of the Storyteller Tour in Jacksonville, Florida. She has since performed the song numerous times during the tour. Underwood's first televised performance of the song was at the 51st Annual Academy of Country Music Awards. She again performed the song live at the 2016 American Country Countdown Awards. Underwood performed the song at the 2016 CMT Music Awards on June 8, 2016. Underwood performed this song in a hits medley at the 52nd Annual Academy of Country Music Awards.

== Track listing ==
- Digital download
1. "Church Bells" – 3:14

== Charts ==
=== Weekly charts ===
Weekly chart performance for "Church Bells"
Chart (2016)	Peak position
Canada (Canadian Hot 100)	64
Canada Country (Billboard)	2
US Billboard Hot 100	43
US Hot Country Songs (Billboard)	2
US Country Airplay (Billboard)	1

=== Year-end charts ===
Year-end chart performance for "Church Bells"
Chart (2016)	Position
US Hot Country Songs (Billboard)	14
US Country Airplay (Billboard)	29

== Certifications ==
Certifications for "Church Bells"
Region	Certification	Certified units/sales
New Zealand (RMNZ)	Gold	15,000^{‡}
United States (RIAA)	3× Platinum	3,000,000^{‡}
^{‡} Sales+streaming figures based on certification alone.

== Awards and nominations ==
=== Grammy Awards ===
Year	Nominee / work	Award	Result
2017	"Church Bells"	Best Country Solo Performance	Nominated

=== iHeartRadio Music Awards ===
Year	Nominee / work	Award	Result
2017	"Church Bells"	Country Song of the Year	Nominated

=== Teen Choice Awards ===
Year	Nominee / work	Award	Result
2016	"Church Bells"	Choice Country Song	Nominated

=== CMT Music Awards ===
Year	Nominee / work	Award	Result
2017	"Church Bells"	Video of the Year	Nominated
2017	"Church Bells"	Female Video of the Year	Won
