= American Country Countdown Awards =

American music award

- Awards show logo
- Awarded for: Achievements in the Country music industry.
- Presented by: Florida Georgia Line
- First award: 2014
- Website: theaccawards.com

Television/radio coverage
- Network: Fox

The American Country Countdown Awards were a country music award presentation that was held in 2014 and 2016. Produced by Dick Clark Productions and co-branded with the syndicated radio show American Country Countdown, it featured awards based on album sales, touring data, and radio airplay (with the exception of the Breakthrough Artist of the Year award which is fan-voted).

The ACCAs were broadcast by Fox, serving as a de facto replacement for their previous American Country Awards show.

== Hosts ==
Year(s)	Host(s)
2014	Florida Georgia Line
2016	—N/a

== 2014 ==
Category	Winner	Nominations
Artist of the Year (presented by Jimmie Johnson and Clayton Kershaw)	Jason Aldean	Luke Bryan; Florida Georgia Line; Lady Antebellum; Blake Shelton
Male Vocalist of the Year (presented by Sara Evans)	Luke Bryan	Jason Aldean; Dierks Bentley; Randy Houser; Blake Shelton
Female Vocalist of the Year (presented by Chase Rice and Emily Kinney)	Miranda Lambert	Danielle Bradbery; Cassadee Pope; Taylor Swift; Carrie Underwood
Group/Duo of the Year (presented by Scotty McCreery and Maddie & Tae)	Florida Georgia Line	The Band Perry; Eli Young Band; Lady Antebellum; Zac Brown Band
Song of the Year (presented by Thomas Rhett and Melissa Fumero)	"Beat of the Music" - Brett Eldredge	"When She Says Baby" - Jason Aldean; "Lettin' the Night Roll" - Justin Moore; "Drink to That All Night" - Jerrod Niemann; "Chillin' It" - Cole Swindell
Collaboration of the Year	"This Is How We Roll" - Florida Georgia Line featuring Luke Bryan	"Small Town Throwdown" - Brantley Gilbert featuring Justin Moore; "Meanwhile Back at Mama's" - Tim McGraw featuring Faith Hill; "My Eyes" - Blake Shelton featuring Gwen Sebastian; "We Were Us" - Keith Urban and Miranda Lambert
Album of the Year (presented by Hunter Hayes)	The Outsiders - Eric Church	Crash My Party -Luke Bryan; Here's to the Good Times - Florida Georgia Line; Just As I Am - Brantley Gilbert; Platinum - Miranda Lambert
Digital Song of the Year	"This is How We Roll" - Florida Georgia Line featuring Luke Bryan	"Burnin' It Down" - Jason Aldean; "Drink a Beer" - Luke Bryan; "Play It Again" - Luke Bryan; "Dirt" - Florida Georgia Line
Breakthrough Artist of the Year (presented by Kira Kazantsev and Chris Young)	Kip Moore	Brett Eldredge; Tyler Farr; Thomas Rhett; Cole Swindell
Nash Icon Award (presented by Kix Brooks)	Reba McEntire	—N/a
Groundbreaker Award (presented by Vince Vaughn)	Kenny Chesney	—N/a

Performers

Artist(s)	Song(s)
Carrie Underwood	"All-American Girl" "Before He Cheats" "Cowboy Casanova" "Blown Away" "Something in the Water"
Luke Bryan; Cole Swindell	"Roller Coaster"
Florida Georgia Line	"Sun Daze"
Kix Brooks; Jerrod Niemann	"Rock My World (Little Country Girl)"
Miranda Lambert	"Platinum"
Kip Moore	"Hey Pretty Girl"
Reba McEntire; Kelly Clarkson; Miranda Lambert	"How Blue" "Take It Back" "Fancy"
Brett Eldredge	"Beat of the Music"
Eric Church	"Talladega"
Lady Antebellum	"Bartender" "Freestyle"
Kenny Chesney	"Til It's Gone"
Jason Aldean	"Just Gettin' Started"
Hank Williams Jr.	"All My Rowdy Friends Are Coming Over Tonight"

== 2016 ==
Winners

Category	Winner	Nominations
Artist of the Year (presented by Dwight Yoakam)	Luke Bryan	Jason Aldean; Florida Georgia Line; Sam Hunt; Blake Shelton
Male Vocalist of the Year (presented by Carrie Underwood)	Luke Bryan	Jason Aldean; Sam Hunt; Blake Shelton; Thomas Rhett
Female Vocalist of the Year (presented by Luke Wilson)	Carrie Underwood	Kelsea Ballerini; Cam; Jana Kramer; Miranda Lambert
Group/Duo of the Year (presented by Sara Evans)	Florida Georgia Line	A Thousand Horses; Dan + Shay; Old Dominion; Zac Brown Band
Breakthrough Male of the Year (presented by Jennifer Nettles and Terry Crews)	Sam Hunt	Chris Janson; Michael Ray
Breakthrough Female of the Year (presented by Scotty McCreery and Maddie & Tae)	Kelsea Ballerini	Cam; Jana Kramer
Breakthrough Group/Duo of the Year	Old Dominion	A Thousand Horses; Dan + Shay
Song of the Year	"Die a Happy Man" - Thomas Rhett	"Homegrown" - Zac Brown Band; "Home Alone Tonight" - Luke Bryan featuring Karen Fairchild; "Stay a Little Longer" - Brothers Osborne; "Strip It Down" - Luke Bryan
Album of the Year (presented by Cat Deeley and Paula Abdul)	Traveller - Chris Stapleton	Jekyll and Hyde - Zac Brown Band; Kill the Lights - Luke Bryan; Montevallo - Sam Hunt; Storyteller - Carrie Underwood
Digital Song of the Year	"Girl Crush" - Little Big Town	"Die a Happy Man" - Thomas Rhett; "Kick the Dust Up" - Luke Bryan
Digital Album of the Year (presented by Jennifer Nettles and Terry Crews)	Montevallo - Sam Hunt	Anything Goes - Florida Georgia Line; Tangled Up - Thomas Rhett
Touring Artist of the Year	Garth Brooks	Luke Bryan; Kenny Chesney; Shania Twain; Zac Brown Band
Nash Icon Award (presented by Reba McEntire)	Brooks & Dunn	—N/a

Performers

Artist(s)	Song(s)
Jennifer Nettles; Cam; Martina McBride	"This One's for the Girls"
Luke Bryan	"Huntin', Fishin' and Lovin' Every Day"
Florida Georgia Line	"H.O.L.Y."
Cam (introduced by Chris Lane and Canaan Smith)	"Mayday”
Cole Swindell (introduced by Chase Bryant and Michael Ray)	"You Should Be Here"
Chris Janson	"Buy Me a Boat”
Sam Hunt	"Make You Miss Me"
Thomas Rhett	"Die a Happy Man"
Carrie Underwood	"Church Bells"
Brooks & Dunn	"Red Dirt Road"
Kelsea Ballerini	"Dibs”
Dan + Shay (introduced by Maddie & Tae)	"Nothin' Like You" "From the Ground Up"
Martina McBride	"Reckless”
Toby Keith; The Strangers (introduced by Matthew McConaughey)	"Mama Tried" "I Started Loving You Again" "I Think I'll Just Stay Here and Drink" "Workin' Man Blues" "Silver Wings" "Okie From Muskogee" "The Fightin' Side of Me"

== Most wins ==
- Luke Bryan - 5
- Florida Georgia Line - 4
- Sam Hunt - 2
- Jason Aldean - 1
- Kelsea Ballerini - 1
- Kenny Chesney - 1
- Eric Church - 1
- Brett Eldredge - 1
- Miranda Lambert - 1
- Little Big Town - 1
- Kip Moore - 1
- Old Dominion - 1
- Thomas Rhett - 1
- Chris Stapleton - 1
- Carrie Underwood - 1
