= Southbound (Carrie Underwood song) =

2019 song by Carrie Underwood

Single by Carrie Underwood

from the album Cry Pretty
- Released: April 29, 2019
- Studio: Southern Ground (Nashville, TN); Rock the Soul Entertainment (Nashville, TN)
- Genre: Country pop
- Length: 3:22
- Label: Capitol Nashville
- Songwriters: Carrie Underwood; David Garcia; Josh Miller
- Producers: Carrie Underwood; David Garcia

Carrie Underwood singles chronology
"Love Wins" (2018)	"Southbound" (2019)	"Drinking Alone" (2019)

Music video
- "Carrie Underwood - Southbound (Official Music Video)" on YouTube

"Southbound" is a song co-written and recorded by American singer Carrie Underwood, and released as the third single from her sixth studio album, Cry Pretty. The single had an official release day of April 29, 2019. The song was written by Underwood, David Garcia and Josh Miller.

== Writing and composition ==
“Southbound” was written by Underwood, co-producer David Garcia and Josh Miller. Underwood said of the writing process, "I was like, 'This sounds like fun, I think. We can do something fun with this.' But then you realize how tricky for some reason it is to be a woman and write kind of a drinking party boat song. You wouldn’t think it would be any different, but for some reason, I feel like a guy could get away with saying this line that we just threw out there, but I can’t for some reason." When talking about particular characters in the song, she added, "I used Katie in the song as an example. So, Katie, we wanted to make her have a little too much fun, but for every line we came out with, it was like, 'Well, we don’t want it to be sad.' We still had to make Katie have a little respect but wanted to just get it out there that some people were having too much fun. It surprisingly took us a while to write it but by the end of it, it was like, 'Well, this is a lot of fun,'" she added. "I feel like everybody kind of gravitated towards that one when we were all done with it." “Southbound” was one of the final songs written for the album.

== Critical reception ==
Entertainment Weekly gave the song favorable reception in their review of the album, writing, "One of Cry Pretty's strangest surprises is a Florida Georgia Line-style party song called 'Southbound' that finds her singing about tan lines and 'redneck margaritas.' It's probably the most casual Underwood's ever been, and, sung by a male artist, it would have felt almost impossibly unoriginal. Recorded by a woman who doesn’t exactly make pontoon day drinking a part of her personal brand, it's pleasingly contrarian: perhaps it's Underwood trying to reclaim a style of music that's been co-opted and ridden high on the charts by the genre's leading men." Sounds Like Nashville similarly praised the song, highlighting its "propulsive rhythm, sunny guitar riffs and breezy organ accents", also noting that it was "the first time in recent years that the Oklahoma native has offered up such a carefree track, and its good-time lyrics are all about pontoon-boat weekends, two-for-one redneck margaritas, tan lines and cheap sunglasses." Billy Dukes of Taste of Country praised the song's melody and production, likening the latter to Keith Urban and writing that the song is "as compelling as anything she's released in several years."

Consequence of Sound gave a less favorable review of the song in their review of the album, writing that it was "a bit of fluffy party music high on southern pride."

== Commercial performance ==
In the United States, "Southbound" reached No. 11 on the Billboard Hot Country Songs chart and No. 3 on the Country Airplay chart, becoming Underwood's 28th Top 10 hit on that chart. It debuted at No. 96 on the Billboard Hot 100 chart and peaked at No. 65.

In Canada, "Southbound" peaked at No. 1 on Billboard Canada Country chart, becoming her first single to top the chart since "Dirty Laundry" in 2016.

As of October 2019, it has sold 89,000 copies in the United States. The song was certified Platinum by the RIAA on August 9, 2021, denoting equivalent sales of over 1,000,000 units.

== Music video ==
The official music video for the song debuted on Underwood's YouTube channel on June 8, 2019. The video was filmed on Cinco de Mayo and features some of Underwood's friends and family, including her husband, Mike Fisher, and their son, Isaiah. Directed by Jeff Venable, it features behind-the-scenes footage of Underwood's 2019 Cry Pretty Tour 360, intercut with Underwood, her husband, and family and friends having a big celebration at a dock on Lake Travis in Austin, Texas.

== Live performances ==
Underwood gave the first live performance of the song at the 54th Academy of Country Music awards on April 7, 2019. She performed the song again on the American Idol finale on May 19, 2019. Underwood also used the song to open the Cry Pretty Tour 360. Underwood also performed it on the 2019 CMT Music Awards at The Parthenon on June 5, 2019, in Nashville. She included the song in her set at Glastonbury Festival in June 2019.

== Charts ==
=== Weekly charts ===
Chart (2019)	Peak position
Australia Country Hot 50 (TMN)	17
Belgium (Ultratip Bubbling Under Flanders)	18
Canada Country (Billboard)	1
US Billboard Hot 100	64
US Country Airplay (Billboard)	3
US Hot Country Songs (Billboard)	11

=== Year-end charts ===
Chart (2019)	Position
US Country Airplay (Billboard)	36
US Hot Country Songs (Billboard)	41

== Certifications ==
Region	Certification	Certified units/sales
United States (RIAA)	Platinum	1,000,000^{‡}
^{‡} Sales+streaming figures based on certification alone.
