= Love Wins (song) =

2018 song by Carrie Underwood

Single by Carrie Underwood

from the album Cry Pretty
- Released: August 31, 2018
- Studio: Southern Ground (Nashville, TN); Rock the Soul Entertainment (Nashville, TN); Library (Nashville, TN)
- Genre: Country
- Length: 3:47
- Label: Capitol Nashville
- Songwriters: Carrie Underwood; Brett James; David Garcia
- Producers: Carrie Underwood; David Garcia

Carrie Underwood singles chronology
"Cry Pretty" (2018)	"Love Wins" (2018)	"Southbound" (2019)

Music video
- "Love Wins" on YouTube

"Love Wins" is a song recorded by American singer Carrie Underwood. The song was written by Underwood with Brett James and David Garcia, and produced by Garcia and Underwood. It was released on August 31, 2018, as the second single from her sixth studio album, Cry Pretty. "Love Wins" officially impacted country radio on September 17, 2018.

The song was featured in the motion picture, Breakthrough.

== Writing and composition ==
The song was written by Underwood, Brett James, and David Garcia. Underwood said of the song, "I do think that we as humans are inherently good and we need to remember that. Because we're different, that doesn't make somebody else bad, it just makes us different. We wanted that song to be hopeful and to maybe make somebody stop and think about that."

Further expanding on what motivated her to write the song, Underwood said, "If we don’t sing or write important songs, what’s the point? It’s just noise and static. If you are scared about what people are going to ask you about something that you feel passionately about - this art - you are going to write fluff. At the end of my life, will I care? Will it mean anything?"

The song is composed in the key of G major with a moderately fast tempo of approximately 132 beats per minute. It follows the chord pattern C-G-Em7-D, and Underwood's vocals range from G_{3} to D_{5}.

== Critical reception ==
The song has received mostly positive reviews upon its release. Taste of Country described it as an "anthemic, mid-tempo power ballad," and highlighted the use of a backing choir. Robert Crawford, for Rolling Stone magazine, described it as "an open-armed anthem that calls for peace in a time of civil unrest". He continued, "Underwood is at her brazen best, filled with glory notes, gospel overtones and power-ballad gloss. She shies away from making direct references to politicians or unfair legislation, leaning instead on an "all you need is love" sentiment that goes down easily and inoffensively on both sides of the aisle".

Kyle’s Korner gave a more mixed review of the song, saying that it was “heavily reliant on Underwood’s gravitas to sell people on the sentiment that things need to change, and while she succeeds in doing so, it doesn’t give listeners any ideas as to what they can do to make things better, which is something that a lot of people are yearning for right now.”

== Commercial performance ==
"Love Wins" debuted at number 90 on the Scottish Singles Chart for the week ending September 8, 2018. In the United States, it debuted at number 30 on the Hot Country Songs chart for the week ending September 15, 2018. The following week, it debuted at number 34 on the Country Airplay chart. The song peaked at number 11 on the Country Airplay chart and number 14 on the Hot Country Songs chart, becoming the first single of her career officially promoted to country radio to miss the top ten on either chart. Previously, Underwood had scored 27 consecutive top ten hits on the Country Airplay.

As of March 2019, the song has sold 70,000 copies in the United States. The song was certified Gold by the RIAA on August 16, 2019.

== Music video ==
The lyric video of the song was uploaded to Underwood's YouTube channel on August 31, 2018. The official video premiered on Apple Music on September 10, 2018, and was released to YouTube the next day. It was directed by Shane Drake, whom Underwood had worked with previously on her video for "Dirty Laundry". Billboard writes "the video begins with a hopeless-looking group of people walking on a road in a post-apocalyptical setting as Underwood, in a goddess-like orange dress, emotionally leans into the track’s sentimental lyrics. Underwood looks radiant in her silk dress as she approaches the country’s critical political moment -- touching on themes of immigration and violence, while offering optimistic advice. As the crowd continues their journey, they find comfort in each other, arriving in some sort of promise land as Underwood chants the chorus. The video then shifts perspective as the group of people, now a community, rejoice in their newfound land while Underwood, now wearing a white long-sleeve butterfly gown and a face full of colorful make-up, joyfully sings to the crowd. As the loud clapping drums follow her powerful voice, the party turns into a vibrant celebration with colored powder being thrown everywhere, all thanks to the power of love and unity."

== Live performances ==
On September 13, 2018, Underwood performed the single live as a musical guest on The Tonight Show Starring Jimmy Fallon at Central Park. She again performed the song on The Ellen DeGeneres Show on September 19, 2018. On November 14, 2018, Underwood performed the song at the 52nd Annual Country Music Association Awards. It also served as the encore to the set list of Underwood's Cry Pretty Tour 360.

== Charts ==
=== Weekly charts ===
Chart (2018–2019)	Peak position
Canada Country (Billboard)	26
Scottish Singles Sales (Official Charts)	90
US Billboard Hot 100	83
US Country Airplay (Billboard)	11
US Hot Country Songs (Billboard)	14

=== Year-end charts ===
Chart (2018)	Position
US Hot Country Songs (Billboard)	98
Chart (2019)	Position
US Country Airplay (Billboard)	45
US Hot Country Songs (Billboard)	50

== Certifications ==
Region	Certification	Certified units/sales
United States (RIAA)	Gold	500,000^{‡}
^{‡} Sales+streaming figures based on certification alone.

== Awards and nominations ==
=== CMT Music Awards ===
Year	Nominee / work	Award	Result
2019	"Love Wins"	Female Video of the Year	Won
