= Cry Pretty =

Studio album by Carrie Underwood
- Released: September 14, 2018
- Genre: Country
- Length: 50:26
- Label: Capitol Nashville
- Producers: David Garcia; Jim Jonsin; Carrie Underwood

Carrie Underwood chronology
Storyteller (2015)	Cry Pretty (2018)	My Gift (2020)

Singles from Cry Pretty
- 1. "Cry Pretty" Released: April 11, 2018; 2. "Love Wins" Released: August 31, 2018; 3. "Southbound" Released: April 29, 2019; 4. "Drinking Alone" Released: October 28, 2019

Cry Pretty is the sixth studio album by American singer and songwriter Carrie Underwood. It was released on September 14, 2018, as Underwood's first album with Capitol Records Nashville after signing a global deal with Universal Music Group at the start of 2017. The album marked the first co-producing effort by Underwood, who partnered with David Garcia for the record.

Cry Pretty was met with positive reviews from music critics, and debuted at number one on the US Billboard 200, making Underwood the first woman to hit the top of the Billboard 200 chart with four country albums. It also achieved the biggest sales week for a country album in more than three years, as well as the biggest sales week for a female artist in 2018. It debuted at number one in Canada, number four in Australia and charted in several other markets.

Four singles supported Cry Pretty: "Cry Pretty", "Love Wins", "Southbound", and "Drinking Alone". To further promote the album, Underwood embarked on Cry Pretty Tour 360, which started on May 1 and ended on October 31, 2019.

== Background ==
=== Development and production ===
In April 2018, Underwood released a statement on the album, stating that she felt "stronger and more creative than ever" at that point in her career, and that the record reflects this growth through its emotional, soulful, and authentic tone, while still allowing "some fun". Songwriter and producer David Garcia was selected to co-produce the album with Underwood, and Cry Pretty marks Underwood's first effort as producer, with her co-writing nine of the album's thirteen tracks. Although the making of the album had been going on for nearly a year before Underwood's fall and subsequent injuries in 2017, she wasn't able to record vocals for the songs until 2018, due to the damage to her mouth.

=== Themes ===
Underwood described Cry Pretty as her most personal project to date, explaining that she was more creatively involved than ever before and expressing pride in the result. She added that her hope was for listeners to "find something that makes them feel something".

Underwood had reserved the track "The Bullet" for several album cycles, finally deciding to release it on the Cry Pretty album. She explained that the song was intended to be "timely but not political", emphasizing that it focuses less on opinions or ideological positions and more on the human impact of real events, particularly the people affected by them. Underwood added that she felt the song ultimately "found its home" on the album. Underwood co-wrote the album's title track following three miscarriages over a two-year period, drawing on personal experiences in which she was privately enduring "horrible things" while continuing to present herself publicly through interviews and photoshoots. She further explained that, unlike much of her earlier work, the album's more personal material compelled her to write directly about herself, stating that amid the ups and downs of the previous year and early 2018, it was simply "what was on my mind and on my heart".

== Composition ==
A country album, Cry Pretty spans pop and R&B, with Underwood sounding "better than ever" following her recovery period. In addition, the record's sound blends "rafters-reaching country anthems" while incorporating dance and hip-hop rhythms into a "radio-ready twang-pop" framework. Underwood employs a familiar structural approach; having "pinned down the formula" by nodding to country tradition, incorporating "thick pop production", and centering the album around ballads that "build until she can release that big voice", with "just enough bounce" used to maintain momentum across the record.

Lyrically, Cry Pretty foregrounds emotional openness as a central organizing principle, and this approach is established on the title track, which opens with the admission that Underwood is "not usually the kind to show my heart to the world", before the album proceeds to explore emotions she had previously kept "in reserve" across its runtime. Several songs address themes including broken relationships, substance abuse, gun violence, and equality. In particular, "The Bullet" is described as the album's main "statement" on gun violence, a song Underwood had "been considering for inclusion on several albums" before using it in response to the Las Vegas mass shooting. The album places this material within a polished, radio-oriented framework combining "uplift" and "melancholy".

== Release and promotion ==
Underwood announced the album on April 8, 2018. The track list of the album and its songwriting credits were released prior to the listening event, on August 20. She performed the title track for the first time at the 53rd Academy of Country Music Awards on April 15, which was well received by critics. She returned to American Idol on May 13, to give the second televised performance of "Cry Pretty". On June 6, she performed "Cry Pretty" at 2018 CMT Music Awards, and "Spinning Bottles" at 2018 American Music Awards on October 9.

She gave her first live performance of "Southbound" at the 54th Academy of Country Music Awards on April 7, 2019. On May 19, she performed the song at American Idol and Nashville's Parthenon on June 5. Underwood performed "Low" from the album on The Late Show with Stephen Colbert. The album's fourth single, "Drinking Alone," had its debut televised performance at the 53rd Country Music Association awards on November 13.

=== Singles ===
"Cry Pretty", the first single from the album, was released on April 11, 2018. Three days before of its release, she teased the song through her social media alongside an image of her eye with glitters placed underneath. Two days later, she shared an open letter, showing the co-writers of the song, Hillary Lindsey, Liz Rose and Lori McKenna, as well as the meaning of its title. On May 6, the music video of the song was released. Commercially, "Cry Pretty" debuted at number 20 and peaked at number 5 on the Billboard Hot Country Songs chart. It topped the Digital Songs chart with 54,000 downloads sold in its first week, becoming Underwood's first song to do so, and it also debuted at number 48 on the Billboard Hot 100. The song peaked at number nine on the Billboard Country Airplay chart. "Love Wins" was released as the second single from the album on August 31, 2018, alongside a lyric video. Underwood, David Garcia and Brett James co-wrote the song, and the former of two produced it. The music video for "Love Wins" was released on September 11. It debuted at number 30 on the Hot Country Songs chart for the week of September 15. On September 7, "End Up with You" was released as a promotional single.

"Southbound" was released as the third single from the album on April 29, 2019. Its music video was released on June 8. Written by Underwood, Garcia and Josh Miller, it reached number three on the Billboard Country Airplay chart and number 11 on the Hot Country Songs chart. The fourth and last single, "Drinking Alone", was released. It was co-written by Underwood, Garcia and James, as well as impacted terrestrial radio on October 28 and country radio on November 4.

=== Tour ===
On August 8, 2018, Underwood announced Cry Pretty Tour 360 in support of the album; the first date was May 1, 2019, in Greensboro, North Carolina and the tour concluded on October 31 in Detroit, Michigan, playing 54 shows. Runaway June and Maddie & Tae were the supporting acts of the tour.

== Critical reception ==
Professional ratings
Aggregate scores
Source	Rating
Metacritic	69/100
Review scores
Source	Rating
AllMusic	4.5/5 stars
The A.V. Club	B+
Consequence	B
Entertainment Weekly	B+
Exclaim!	6/10
The Guardian	2/5 stars
Newsday	4/5 stars
Paste	6.4/10
PopMatters	6/10
Rolling Stone	3.5/5 stars

On Metacritic, which assigns a normalized rating out of 100 to reviews from mainstream publications, the album has an average score of 69, based on eleven reviews.

Several reviewers highlighted the album's stylistic direction and Underwood's vocal authority within a pop-leaning country framework. Rolling Stone gave Cry Pretty three and a half stars, describing it as a "modern country album pivoting into pop and R&B" with "grade-A" songwriting and Underwood's "mighty" voice carrying even its weaker moments, while noting that its "architecture is often R&B at [its] core" despite echoes of artists such as Adele and Beyoncé. Entertainment Weekly similarly emphasized duality, framing the record as a meeting of "two Carries", portraying Underwood as more vulnerable and outspoken at her best, though it argued that when she "falls into the costumes of others", the effect becomes harder to accept. Writing for PopMatters, the reviewer situated the record within a familiar formula, observing that although it is neither musically groundbreaking nor controversial, Underwood's artistic sensibility allows her to rise above those constraints.

Other positive assessments focused on Underwood's technical performance and artistic maturity. Markos Papadatos of the Digital Journal highlighted her "impeccable" vocal control and versatility as a singer, songwriter, and producer, ultimately describing the album as a "superb studio effort" and awarding it an A rating. The Diamondback likewise characterized Cry Pretty as "poised and mature", praising its lyricism, falsettos, and sustained vulnerability, and concluding that the album reinforces Underwood's "country regality" while it reflects growth both musically and personally.

More critical responses questioned the album's lyrical specificity and the weight of its thematic gestures. The Los Angeles Times acknowledged that Underwood "sets off all kinds of vocal fireworks", but argued that the songwriting often frames emotions in overly generalized terms, which makes it difficult to discern a clear sense of personal specificity across the record. Paste expressed a related reservation, suggesting that while the album touches on issues such as gun violence and equality, its approach remains relatively restrained, and that its broader significance lies less in lyrical boldness than in the fact that it will reach "millions of people all over the world".

=== Accolades ===
At the 2019 Billboard Music Awards, Cry Pretty received a nomination for Top Country Album and for Country Music Association Award for Album of the Year at the 53rd Annual Country Music Association Awards. The album won the award for Favorite Country Album at the 47th Annual American Music Awards, making Underwood the only artist to receive that award for every album they have released.

== Commercial performance ==
In the United States, Cry Pretty debuted on top of the Billboard 200 with 266,000 album-equivalent units, including 251,000 pure album sales, giving Underwood her fourth number-one album, and making her the first woman to have four number-one country albums on the chart. It is the largest sales week for a country album since Luke Bryan's Kill the Lights in 2015, and the biggest sales week for a female artist in 2018. It also debuted atop the Top Country Albums chart, becoming her seventh consecutive number one album on that chart. The debut of Cry Pretty at number one on the Billboard 200 prompted Underwood to rise from number sixty-one to the top of Billboard Artist 100. It made her the first female country artist to top that chart. It was the seventh best-selling album of 2018 in the United States, with 401,000 copies sold that year. It has sold 534,000 physical copies and a total of 870,000 copies including streaming in the United States as of January 2020. Cry Pretty was certified Gold by the RIAA on October 23, 2018, and Platinum on February 12, 2020.

The album also debuted at number one on the Canadian Albums Chart with 28,000 album-equivalent units, giving Underwood her third number-one album in the country. Cry Pretty opened at number four on the Australian ARIA Albums Chart, becoming her third top five album there, while also debuting at number one on the country component chart. It also debuted at number 12 in Scotland and number sixteen on the UK Albums Chart.

The album's four singles, "Cry Pretty," "Love Wins," "Southbound," and "Drinking Alone" have all been certified gold or platinum by the RIAA as of August 2021, with streaming included.

== Track listing ==
All songs were produced by Underwood and David Garcia, except where noted.

Cry Baby track listing
No.	Title	Writer(s)	Producer	Length
1.	"Cry Pretty"	Carrie Underwood; Hillary Lindsey; Lori McKenna; Liz Rose		4:07
2.	"Ghosts on the Stereo"	Lindsey; Tom Douglas; Andrew Dorff		4:13
3.	"Low"	Underwood; Lindsey; David Garcia		3:31
4.	"Backsliding"	Underwood; Lindsey; Garcia		4:37
5.	"Southbound"	Underwood; Garcia; Josh Miller		3:22
6.	"That Song That We Used to Make Love To"	Lindsey; Jason Evigan		3:35
7.	"Drinking Alone"	Underwood; Garcia; Brett James		4:18
8.	"The Bullet"	Marc Beeson; Andy Albert; Allen Shamblin		4:10
9.	"Spinning Bottles"	Underwood; Lindsey; Garcia; Carol Oordt		3:16
10.	"Love Wins"	Underwood; Garcia; James		3:48
11.	"End Up with You"	Lindsey; Brett McLaughlin; Will Weatherly		3:13
12.	"Kingdom"	Underwood; Chris DeStefano; Dave Barnes		4:34
13.	"The Champion" (featuring Ludacris; bonus track)	Underwood; Christopher Bridges; DeStefano; James	Jim Jonsin	3:42
Total length:				50:26

=== Notes ===
- "The Champion" bonus track was not included on the LP release.

== Personnel ==
- Carrie Underwood – lead vocals, backing vocals (1, 2, 4–8, 10, 11, 12), percussion (11)
- Dave Cohen – keyboards (1, 2, 5, 6, 7, 9, 10, 12), programming (6, 7, 10, 12)
- Charlie Judge – keyboards (3, 8), programming (3)
- Jason Evigan – keyboards (6), programming (6)
- Fred Williams – keyboards (6, 12), programming (6, 12)
- Sarah Emily Berrios – programming (8)
- Will Weatherly – keyboards (11), programming (11)
- Robert Dante – keyboards (13), acoustic piano (13)
- David Garcia – acoustic guitar (1, 7, 10), electric guitar (3, 5, 8, 11), keyboards (3–12), programming (3–8, 10, 11, 12), drums (4), backing vocals (4), percussion (11)
- Ilya Toshinsky – acoustic guitar (1, 2, 5, 11, 12), bouzouki (2), banjo (5), dobro (5), electric guitar (5), mandolin (5, 10, 12), resonator guitar (6)
- Dan Dugmore – pedal steel guitar (1, 3, 6, 8–12)
- Tom Bukovac – electric guitar (1,2, 5, 7, 10)
- Rob McNelley – electric guitar (1,2, 3, 5–8, 10, 11, 12)
- Steve Hinson – pedal steel guitar (2)
- Hillary Lindsey – acoustic guitar (3), backing vocals (4, 8, 11)
- Bryan Sutton – acoustic guitar (3, 4, 8)
- Danny Rader – acoustic guitar (3, 4, 6, 8, 10), electric guitar (3, 4, 8, 12), dobro (6, 7)
- Michael Burman – guitar (13)
- Bones Owens – guitar (13)
- Ben Haggard – acoustic guitar (13)
- Jimmie Lee Sloas – bass guitar (1–8, 10, 12)
- Chris McHugh – drums (1, 2, 3, 5–8, 10, 12), percussion (1, 11)
- Nir Z. – drums (11)
- Austin Hoke – cello (9)
- Carole Rabinowitz – cello (10, 12)
- Kris Wilkinson – viola (10, 12)
- Will Hoge – harmonica (5)
- David Angell – violin (10, 12)
- David Davidson – violin (10, 12), strings arrangements (10, 12)
- Holly Williams – backing vocals (2)
- Ivey Childers – backing vocals (5)
- Jenni Fairbanks – backing vocals (5)
- Amanda Luftburrow – backing vocals (5)
- Will Hoge – backing vocals (6)
- Josh Miller – backing vocals (5)
- Dave Barnes – backing vocals (10)
- Perry Coleman – backing vocals (10)
- Vicki Hampton – backing vocals (10)
- Brett James – backing vocals (10)
- Wendy Moten – backing vocals (10)
- Ludacris – featured rapper (13)
- The McCrary Sisters – backing vocals (13)

=== Production ===
- David Garcia – producer (1–12), editing (1–12)
- Carrie Underwood – producer (1–12), creative director
- Jim Jonsin – producer (13), mixing (13)
- John Ditty – engineer (1–12), editing (1–12)
- John Hanes – engineer (1–12)
- Kam Luchterhand – engineer (1–12)
- Doug Johnson – mixing (1–12)
- Chris Lord-Alge – mixing (1, 3, 8)
- Mark Endert – mixing (2, 12)
- Serban Ghenea – mixing (4–7, 9, 10, 11)
- Niko Marzouca – engineer (13), mixing (13)
- Rob Marks – mixing (13)
- Adam Chagnon – musical assistance
- Nik Karpen – musical assistance
- Nate Lowery – production manager
- Bethany Newman – art direction
- Joshua Sage Newman – art direction
- Parker Foote – design
- Randee St. Nicholas – photography
- Ann Edelbulte – manager

== Charts ==
=== Weekly charts ===
Chart (2018)	Peak position
Australian Albums (ARIA)	4
Australian Country Albums (ARIA)	1
Belgian Albums (Ultratop Flanders)	56
Belgian Albums (Ultratop Wallonia)	111
Canadian Albums (Billboard)	1
Dutch Albums (Album Top 100)	46
Irish Albums (IRMA)	40
New Zealand Albums (RMNZ)	32
Scottish Albums (Official Charts)	12
Swiss Albums (Schweizer Hitparade)	36
UK Albums (Official Charts)	16
UK Country Albums (Official Charts)	1
US Billboard 200	1
US Top Country Albums (Billboard)	1

=== Year-end charts ===
Chart (2018)	Position
US Billboard 200	88
US Top Country Albums (Billboard)	10
Chart (2019)	Position
US Billboard 200	140
US Top Country Albums (Billboard)	12
Chart (2020)	Position
US Top Country Albums (Billboard)	57

== Certifications ==
Region	Certification	Certified units/sales
Canada (Music Canada)	Platinum	80,000^{‡}
United States (RIAA)	Platinum	534,000
^{‡} Sales+streaming figures based on certification alone.
