= Storyteller (Carrie Underwood album) =

2015 studio album by Carrie Underwood

Studio album by Carrie Underwood
- Released: October 23, 2015
- Recorded: 2014; February 2015
- Genre: Country
- Length: 46:12
- Label: Arista Nashville; 19
- Producer: Mark Bright; Zach Crowell; Jay Joyce

Carrie Underwood chronology
Greatest Hits: Decade #1 (2014)	Storyteller (2015)	Cry Pretty (2018)

Singles from Storyteller
- 1. "Smoke Break" Released: August 21, 2015; 2. "Heartbeat" Released: November 30, 2015; 3. "Chaser" Released: April 1, 2016; 4. "Church Bells" Released: April 11, 2016; 5. "Dirty Laundry" Released: September 5, 2016

Storyteller is the fifth studio album by American singer and songwriter Carrie Underwood. It was released on October 23, 2015, via Sony Music Nashville. Following the release and success of her fourth studio album, Blown Away (2012), Underwood began working on Storyteller in early 2014. However, she tentatively suspended most work on the album because of her pregnancy with her first child. In the midterm, Underwood released her first greatest hits record, Greatest Hits: Decade #1, on December 9, 2014, to much success. After the birth of her son, she took some additional time off before going back into the studio in early 2015 to finish working on the album.

Met with mostly positive reviews from music critics, Storyteller became a commercial success and set multiple records upon its release. By debuting at number two on the Billboard 200 chart, it made Underwood the only country artist in history to have all of her first five studio albums debut at number one or two, and with a number one debut on the Top Country Albums chart, it made her the only artist to score six consecutive number one albums on the chart. Storyteller also performed well internationally upon its release, including a number four debut in Australia, number three in Canada and thirteen in the United Kingdom. As of October 2016, the album has been certified Platinum by the Recording Industry Association of America (RIAA). It marks Underwood's sixth consecutive album to go either Platinum or multi-Platinum.

A country album, Storyteller produced five singles, "Smoke Break", "Heartbeat", "Chaser", "Church Bells" and "Dirty Laundry". "Heartbeat" and "Church Bells" reached number one consecutively on the US Country Airplay chart, while "Smoke Break" peaked at number two. In addition, "Smoke Break", "Heartbeat" and "Dirty Laundry" topped on the Canada Country chart, and those three songs, along with "Church Bells", received Platinum or multi-Platinum certifications.

== Background and recording ==
After the release and success of Carrie Underwood's fourth studio album Blown Away and its international supporting tour Blown Away Tour, Underwood confirmed in August 2013 that she had begun planning on a new album and would start working on it in 2014. She released her first greatest hits album in late 2014 instead while pregnant with her first child. After giving birth in February 2015, Underwood went back into the studio to finish working on the album.

Underwood described Storyteller as being more laid-back and more "twangy" as opposed to Blown Away. She worked with her regular collaborators such as Hillary Lindsey, Ashley Gorley, Chris DeStefano, David Hodges, Brett James, and Mark Bright, although Underwood also worked with new collaborators such as Liz Rose, Zach Crowell, and Jay Joyce. Storyteller marked Underwood's last album under Arista Nashville and Sony Music Group, following her new deal with Universal Music Group's Capitol Nashville.

== Artistic direction and music ==
The cover artwork for Storyteller depicts Underwood in what Angela Stefano from The Boot described as a "dreamy" setting, seated on a pale floor against a similarly light-toned background, with a noticeable "haze" softening the image. She wears red, bejeweled cowboy boots and a flowing ivory shirt with red embroidery, while her hair is styled in a "slightly messy" manner and her makeup remains "simple". Commenting on the album's visual direction, Underwood noted that "each album so far has had its own look, its own feel, its own sound", and added that Storyteller was "definitely no exception".

Underwood adopted contemporary country sounds on Storyteller and indicated that it introduces "some new ideas" without constituting a dramatic stylistic break, emphasizing continuity alongside development. She noted that while certain elements would remain "familiar", there had also been "a lot of growth", and described the overall result as sounding "a little bit different" but still recognizably her, as she framed it as "a little bit of a shift" rather than a radical change. Expanding on this, Underwood explained that she wanted each song to have "its own space", to "look different, sound different, feel different", and characterized the album's tone as carrying a "rock twang". She further remarked that many of the songs she gravitated toward were more "traditional" and "twangy" than much of her earlier work and reflected her attachment to the "storytelling aspect of country music".

"Smoke Break"
A 24-second sample of "Smoke Break". Described as an anthem for "every hard-working person", the song turns the idea of stepping away from stress into its central theme.

Underwood's personal experiences also informed the album's themes; Underwood acknowledged that motherhood influenced some of the material, though she stressed that she did not want to "force anything" or make the subject feel "cheesy". Instead, she described the inspiration as something that "just kind of happened", adding that it is "impossible to not let your life affect things", and that the presence of her son brought a sense of "life magic" into the creative process.

== Promotion ==
On August 20, 2015, Underwood announced the album's title and release date on a livestream on Facebook. She revealed the album's track listing on September 9, via her Instagram account. A day later, Underwood appeared on The Tonight Show Starring Jimmy Fallon and performed "Smoke Break". On September 21, Underwood performed the song at the Apple Music Festival in London. In support of the album, Underwood returned to headline the C2C: Country to Country festival for the first time since 2013. She performed concerts in London, Dublin, Glasgow, Oslo and Stockholm. On October 22, she announced on Facebook that she would perform at the 2015 American Music Awards on November 22.

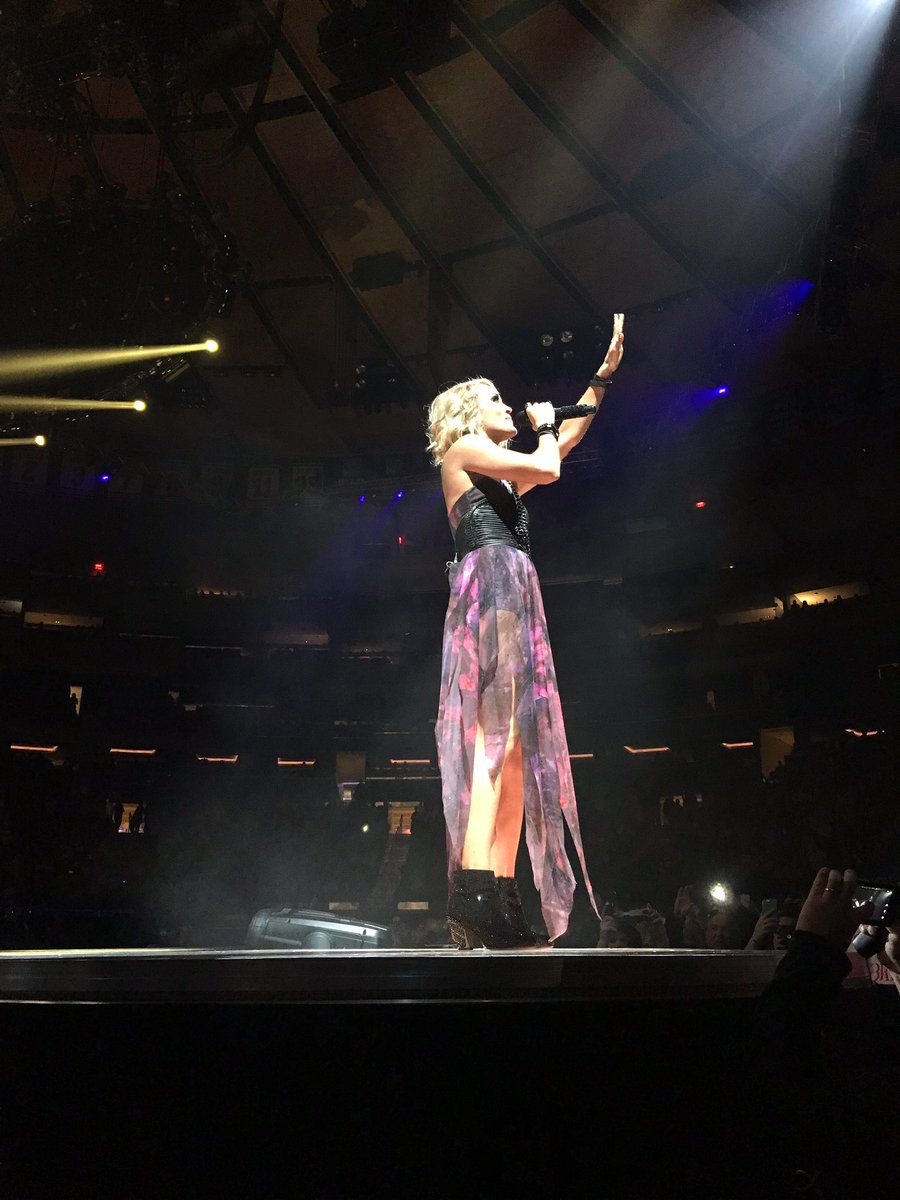
Underwood performing at Madison Square Garden on October 25, 2016

On January 27, 2016, it was revealed that Underwood and Sam Hunt would perform at the 2016 Grammy Awards together. They performed Hunt's "Take Your Time", beginning with a verse and chorus of the song before seamlessly transitioning into Underwood's "Heartbeat", and then returning to the chorus of "Take Your Time". On April 3, Underwood performed the song "Church Bells" at the 2016 Academy of Country Music Awards and at CMT Awards on June 8. On May 19, Sunday Night Football tweeted that Underwood would return at the fourth season of Sunday Night Football, singing "Waiting All Day for Sunday Night".

In October 2017, Underwood announced the release of a live concert film documenting her 2016 Storyteller Tour. Titled Carrie Underwood: The Storyteller Tour — Stories in the Round, Live from Madison Square Garden, the film was scheduled for release in mid-November and was recorded during her October 2016 stop at Madison Square Garden in New York City. The concert film features 22 songs from Underwood's catalog, including 17 chart-topping singles, and highlights the tour's 360-degree stage design and large-scale production.

=== Singles ===
"Smoke Break", the album's lead single, was first teased via Facebook chat on August 20, 2015, and was released a day later. Produced by Jay Joyce, it was written by Underwood along with Chris DeStefano and Hillary Lindsey. The song set an all-time Country Aircheck record for the most-added song on the first week, with 145 Mediabase adds and 159 total Billboard and Country Aircheck reporting stations lining up for the song's official airplay impact date. It debuted number 36 on the US Hot Country Songs chart, eventually peaking at number 4. The song also debuted number 24 and reached number 2 on the US Country Airplay chart, as well as reached atop on the US Country Digital Songs chart. Underwood teased its music video through her social media on August 23, a day before its official release. The second single, "Heartbeat", debuted at the 2015 American Music Awards on November 22. Co-written and produced by Zach Crowell, it was first released as a promotional single from the album on October 9, making its official impact at country radio on November 30. Sam Hunt featured background vocals of the song, and its music video was released on December 1. It sold 23,000 copies, debuting at number 26 on Hot Country Songs chart for the week ending October 31 and reaching number two on the chart. As of October 26, the song has sold 31,000 copies, peaking number one on the Country Airplay Chart. "Renegade Runaway" was released as a promotional single on October 16, 2015. Co-written by Underwood, DeStefano and Lindsey, it peaked at number 34 on the Hot Country Songs chart. "What I Never Knew I Always Wanted", which features Underwood singing about Mike Fisher, was released on October 19 as the next promotional single. It peaked number 32 on the Hot Country Songs chart.

"Chaser" was released exclusively to UK radio stations on April 1, 2016, as the third single of Storyteller. The fourth single is "Church Bells", released to country radio on April 11. It reached number two on the Hot Country Songs chart and number one on the Country Airplay chart. The song was nominated for Best Country Solo Performance at the 59th Grammy Awards. On August 11, Underwood confirmed that "Dirty Laundry" would be sent to country radio. The song was first released on August 12 as the promotional single, and later sent to country radio on September 6. The song was produced by Joyce and written by Crowell, Lindsey, and Ashley Gorley. Directed by Shane Drake, the music video for the song premiered at Entertainment Tonight on October 12. It is presented in stark black-and-white and juxtaposes human performances with imagery of wild animals to symbolically explore themes of infidelity and instinctual behavior. On November 2, she performed "Dirty Laundry" at the 50th CMA Awards. Commercially, it peaked at number two on the Country Airplay chart and number three on Hot Country Songs chart.

=== Tour ===
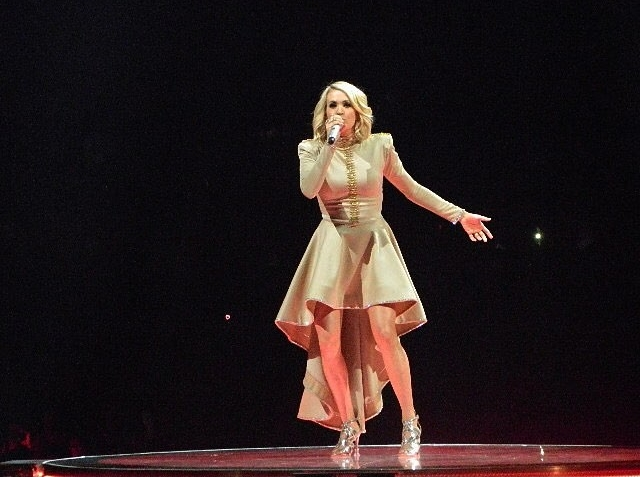
Underwood performing at the Wells Fargo Center during the Storyteller Tour: Stories in the Round

Underwood first teased the accompanying tour titled Storyteller Tour: Stories in the Round on October 27, 2015. She began the tour on January 30, 2016, in Jacksonville, Florida to support the album. In April, additional dates were announced for a fall leg of the tour, which resumed on September 4 in Spokane, Washington, with Easton Corbin, the Swon Brothers and Keith Urban serving as opening acts. The first leg of the tour was completed by May 31, concluding in London, Ontario. As with her previous tours, Underwood scheduled the run during her husband Mike Fisher's NHL season, a pattern that had often been followed by taking time off during the summer. The fall schedule included major arena stops such as the Staples Center in Los Angeles, Bridgestone Arena in Nashville, and Madison Square Garden in New York City. The tour ultimately concluded on November 28, with a final performance in Salt Lake City, Utah.

Over the course of the run, Underwood and her band performed 92 shows, drawing a total audience of approximately one million attendees, with sold-out dates at major venues including Madison Square Garden in New York City, Staples Center in Los Angeles, Bridgestone Arena in Nashville, and Air Canada Centre in Toronto. In Billboard's Hot Tours recap in November, the tour grossed $54.6 million since its launch in January, with overall attendance exceeding 800,000, based on data from its fall North American leg and with only a small number of performances remaining before its conclusion.

== Critical reception ==
Professional ratings
Aggregate scores
Source	Rating
Metacritic	74/100
Review scores
Source	Rating
AllMusic	4/5 stars
Billboard	3.5/5 stars
Entertainment Weekly	A−
Exclaim!	6/10
Newsday	B+
Rolling Stone	3/5 stars
Spin	7/10
USA Today	2.5/4 stars
Vice (Expert Witness)	A−

According to the review aggregator Metacritic, Storyteller received "generally favorable reviews" based on a weighted average score of 74 out of 100 from 9 critic scores.

Several critics focused on the album's command, narrative strength, and refinement of Underwood's established persona. Stephen Thomas Erlewine of AllMusic wrote that the record "demands attention and it deserves it, too", while The Boston Globe's Sarah Rodman called it Underwood's best album yet. Billboard's Jewly Hight emphasized Underwood's authority, arguing that she "commands the spotlight" rather than merely coexisting with contemporary production trends, and observed that the album reconciles the familiar poles of her image—the "Midwestern girl-next-door" and the "imperious diva"—within what she described as "freshened-up aesthetic frames". Robert Christgau, writing for Vice, also highlighted the songwriting, suggesting that the album contains more "good tales" than Greatest Hits: Decade Number 1, while noting that although she "still oversings sometimes", she ultimately allows the songs to "narrate for themselves".

Other reviewers were more critical, particularly of the songwriting's cohesion and the album's reliance on bombast. Jon Caramanica of New York Times questioned the record's expressive sharpness, finding much of the material lacking "bite or pulp" and arguing that the songs function primarily as launch pads for Underwood's "ballistic-missile voice" rather than forming a coherent artistic identity. A similar sense of distance was identified by Stuart Henderson of Exclaim!, who described the album as "more than halfway boring" and contending that its heavy use of "booming bass", "pounding drums", "huge vocals", and "wailing guitars" ultimately dulled its impact, leaving the listener emotionally "anaesthetize[d]".

== Accolades ==
Storyteller received a nomination for Album of the Year for the 2016 American Country Countdown Awards and 50th Annual Country Music Association Awards. At the 2016 American Music Awards, the album won Favorite Country Album, marking Underwood's fifth career win in that category.

Year	Association	Date	Category	Result	Ref.
2016	American Country Countdown Awards	May 1, 2016	Album of the Year	Nominated	
2016	American Music Awards	November 20, 2016	Favorite Country Album	Won	
2016	Billboard Music Awards	May 22, 2016	Top Country Album	Nominated	
2016	Country Music Association Awards	November 2, 2016	Album of the Year	Nominated	

== Commercial performance ==
In the United States, Storyteller debuted at number two on the Billboard 200, selling 177,000 album-equivalent units including 164,000 pure sales with the remainder of its unit total which reflects the album's streaming and track equivalent album units. It made Underwood the only country artist to have his or her first five studio albums debut at number one or number two on the Billboard 200 chart. In addition, the album debuted at number one on the Top Country Albums chart, earning Underwood another record as the only artist to score six consecutive number one albums on that chart. It held the number two position on the Billboard 200 in its second week, moving another 81,000 units including over 73,000 album copies sold. On the chart dated December 19, it rose back to number one on the Top Country Albums for a second week. It was certified Gold by the RIAA on December 4, 2015, for shipments of over 500,000 copies in the US. In October 2016, the album was certified Platinum, one year after its release, becoming the sixth album by Underwood to receive a Platinum certification. As of April 2017, the album has sold 752,100 copies in the US.

Outside of the United States, Storyteller debuted at number three in Canada, number four in Australia, number six in Scotland, and number thirteen on the UK Albums Chart, marking her second top twenty album in the country.

=== Other charted songs ===
Following the release of Storyteller, four of its songs except five overall singles also charted on the Hot Country Songs, "The Girl You Think I Am" at number 38 and "Like I'll Never Love You Again" at number 39. "Relapse" peaked at number 48 with 4,000 copies, while "Choctaw County Affair" peaked at number 68 with 3,000 copies.

== Track listing ==
Standard edition
No.	Title	Writer(s)	Producer	Length
1.	"Renegade Runaway"	Carrie Underwood; Chris DeStefano; Hillary Lindsey	Jay Joyce	3:40
2.	"Dirty Laundry"	Zach Crowell; Ashley Gorley; Lindsey	Joyce	3:25
3.	"Church Bells"	Crowell; Brett James; Lindsey	Mark Bright	3:15
4.	"Heartbeat"	Underwood; Crowell; Gorley	Crowell	3:31
5.	"Smoke Break"	Underwood; DeStefano; Lindsey	Joyce	3:20
6.	"Choctaw County Affair"	Jason White	Joyce	3:31
7.	"Like I'll Never Love You Again"	Lindsey; Lori McKenna; Liz Rose	Joyce	3:37
8.	"Chaser"	Underwood; Mike Elizondo; Lindsey	Joyce	4:24
9.	"Relapse"	Ben Caver; Sara Haze; James	Crowell	3:24
10.	"Clock Don't Stop"	Blair Daly; DeStefano; Lindsey	Bright	3:23
11.	"The Girl You Think I Am"	Underwood; David Hodges; Lindsey	Bright	3:38
12.	"Mexico"	Kathleen Higgins; Jamie Moore; Derrick Adam Southerland	Bright	3:28
13.	"What I Never Knew I Always Wanted"	Underwood; James; Lindsey	Bright	3:36
Total length:				46:12

Target exclusive edition
No.	Title	Writer(s)	Producer(s)	Length
14.	"Heartbeat" (stripped)	Underwood; Crowell; Gorley	Crowell	3:21
15.	"Little Girl Don't Grow Up Too Fast"	Underwood; DeStefano; Lindsey	Bright	4:26
Total length:				53:59

== Personnel ==
Credits were adapted from AllMusic.

=== Performers ===
- Carrie Underwood – lead vocals (1–13), backing vocals (3, 10, 12, 13)
- Hillary Lindsey – backing vocals (1, 2, 5, 7, 8, 10–13)
- Perry Coleman – backing vocals (3, 10, 11, 12)
- Zach Crowell – backing vocals (4, 9)
- Sam Hunt – backing vocals (4)
- Chris DeStefano – backing vocals (5, 7)
- The McCrary Sisters – backing vocals (6)
- Jerry Flowers – backing vocals (9)
- James Moore – backing vocals (12)

=== Musicians ===
- John Deaderick – keyboards (1, 2, 5–8)
- Jay Joyce – keyboards (1, 2, 8), synth pad (1, 2, 5, 7, 8), programming (1, 2, 5, 7, 8), electric guitar (1, 2, 5–8), bass (5, 7)
- Charlie Judge – synthesizers (3, 10, 12, 13), programming (3, 10, 13), accordion (11)
- Jimmy Nichols – acoustic piano (3, 10–13)
- Zach Crowell – keyboards (4, 9), acoustic piano (4), programming (4, 9), guitar (4)
- Tom Bukovac – electric guitar (1, 2, 8, 12)
- Bryan Sutton – acoustic guitar (1, 2, 8)
- Kenny Greenberg – electric guitar (3, 10–13)
- Ilya Toshinsky – acoustic guitar (3, 10–13), mandolin (11)
- Devin Malone – electric guitar (4, 9), pedal steel guitar (4), cello (4)
- Pat McGrath – acoustic guitar (4, 9), banjo (4), mandolin (9)
- Derek Wells – electric guitar (4, 9)
- Adam Ollendorff – dobro (4)
- Forest Glen Whitehead – acoustic guitar (5, 7)
- Rob McNelley – electric guitar (6)
- Jerry Flowers – bass (1, 2, 8)
- Michael Rhodes – bass (3, 12, 13)
- Jimmie Lee Sloas – bass (4, 9, 10, 11)
- Dave Roe – bass (5, 6, 7)
- Fred Eltringham – drums (1, 2, 5–8), percussion (1, 2, 5–8)
- Chris McHugh – drums (3, 4, 9–13)
- Eric Darken – percussion (3, 10–13)
- Travis Meadows – harmonica (6)

=== Production and design ===
- Producers – Jay Joyce (Tracks 1, 2 & 5–8); Mark Bright (Tracks 3 & 10–13); Zach Crowell (Tracks 4 & 9).
- Production Assistant (Tracks 1, 2 & 5–8) – Melissa Spillman
- A&R (Tracks 3 & 10–13) – Kristen Wines
- Production Coordination – Mike "Frog" Girffith (Tracks 3 & 10–13); Kenley Flynn (Tracks 4 & 9).
- Engineers – Jason Hall (Tracks 1, 2 & 5–8); Derek Bason (Tracks 3 & 10–13); Nick Autry (Tracks 4 & 9).
- Additional Engineers – Adam Chagnon and Andrew Schubert (Tracks 1, 2 & 4–9); Zach Crowell (Tracks 4 & 9).
- Assistant Engineers – Paul Cossette and Caleb VanBuskirk (Tracks 1, 2 & 5–8); Chris Small (Tracks 3 & 10–13); Kam Luchterland (Tracks 4 & 9).
- Recorded at Starstruck Studios, Sound Stage Studios and The Pizza Kitchen (Nashville, Tennessee).
- Mixing – Chris Lord-Alge (Tracks 1, 2 & 4–9); Derek Bason (Tracks 3 & 10–13)
- Mix Assistants – Keith Armstrong and Nik Karpen (Tracks 1, 2 & 4–9); Chris Small (Tracks 3 & 10–13).
- Tracks 1, 2 & 4–9 mixed at Mix LA (Los Angeles, California).
- Tracks 3 & 10–13 mixed at Starstruck Studios.
- Digital Editing – Derek Bason and Chris Small (Tracks 3 & 10–13); Zach Crowell (Tracks 4 & 9).
- Mastered by Adam Ayan at Gateway Mastering (Portland, Maine).
- Creative Director and Design – Scott McDaniel
- Package Design – Grace Boto
- Photography – Randee St. Nichols
- Liner Notes – Carrie Underwood
- Manager – Ann Edelblute

== Charts ==
=== Weekly charts ===
Chart (2015)	Peak position
Australian Albums (ARIA)	4
Australian Country Albums (ARIA)	1
Belgian Albums (Ultratop Flanders)	87
Belgian Albums (Ultratop Wallonia)	193
Canadian Albums (Billboard)	3
Dutch Albums (Album Top 100)	67
Irish Albums (IRMA)	18
New Zealand Albums (RMNZ)	13
Scottish Albums (OCC)	6
South Korean International Albums (Gaon)	39
Swiss Albums (Schweizer Hitparade)	38
UK Albums (OCC)	13
UK Country Albums (OCC)	1
US Billboard 200	2
US Top Country Albums (Billboard)	1

=== Year-end charts ===
Chart (2015)	Position
Australian Country Albums (ARIA)	12
US Billboard 200	108
US Top Country Albums (Billboard)	14
Chart (2016)	Position
Canadian Albums (Billboard)	50
US Billboard 200	36
US Top Country Albums (Billboard)	4
Chart (2017)	Position
US Top Country Albums (Billboard)	40

== Certifications ==
Region	Certification	Certified units/sales
United Kingdom (BPI)	Silver	60,000^{‡}
United States (RIAA)	Platinum	1,000,000^{‡}
^{‡} Sales+streaming figures based on certification alone.

== Release history ==
Region	Date	Format(s)	Label	Ref.
Australia	October 23, 2015	CD; digital download	Sony Music Nashville	
Canada	October 23, 2015	CD; digital download	Arista Nashville; 19	
United Kingdom	October 23, 2015	CD; digital download	Columbia	
United States	October 23, 2015	CD; digital download	Arista Nashville; 19	
