= Cry Pretty (song) =

Single by Carrie Underwood

from the album Cry Pretty
- Released: April 11, 2018
- Studio: Southern Ground (Nashville, TN); Rock the Soul Entertainment (Nashville, TN)
- Genre: Country
- Length: 4:06
- Label: Capitol Nashville
- Songwriter(s): Carrie Underwood; Hillary Lindsey; Liz Rose; Lori McKenna
- Producer(s): Carrie Underwood; David Garcia

Carrie Underwood singles chronology
"The Champion" (2018)	"Cry Pretty" (2018)	"Love Wins" (2018)

Music video
- "Cry Pretty" on YouTube

"Cry Pretty" is a song co-written and recorded by American country music singer Carrie Underwood. It was released on April 11, 2018, as the lead single and title track from her sixth studio album, Cry Pretty. The song received critical acclaim with Billboard naming it the best country song of 2018.

== Writing and composition ==
"Cry Pretty" was written by Underwood, Hillary Lindsey, Liz Rose, and Lori McKenna. About the song, Underwood said:

"The title refers to when emotions take over and you just can't hold them back. It really speaks to a lot of things that have happened in the past year and I hope when you hear it, you can relate those feelings to those times in your life. It's emotional. It's real. And it rocks!"

Underwood revealed the personal nature of the song's lyrics, which center around the emotions she experienced after having three miscarriages in two years:

"Right after I'd found out I'd lose a baby, I'd have a writing session. I'd be like, 'Let's go,' you know? I can't just sit around thinking about this. I wanna work. I wanna do this. Because I would literally have these horrible things going on in my life, and then have to go smile and do some interviews, or do a photo shoot, or something. So it was just kind of therapeutic, I guess.".

== Critical reception ==
"Cry Pretty" received positive reviews upon its release. Billboard praised its subject matter, writing, "The four-minute song digs deep into the difficulty of "dressing up" heartache with fancy rhinestones and lace when all you want to do is break down and cry, building to a sky-high crescendo in the final minute, where Underwood unleashes the full, soulful power of her voice." NPR praised Underwood's delivery, writing that her "performance communicates the same weary rage these classics do, the injustice of being expected to keep it together so that the world is a little better-looking, a version of country's tragic punchlines that could only be sung by a woman." USA Today praised the song, writing "The track is a promising return for Underwood, featuring an enduring melody that's instantly more memorable than "The Champion", her Super Bowl theme she released in January. For country music's unshakable sweetheart, "Cry Pretty" shows Underwood in full empowerment mode, even if she's not always in control of her emotions."

Best-of lists
Publication	Rank	List
Billboard	1	The 20 Best Country Songs of 2018
Rolling Stone	11	25 Best Country Songs of 2018

== Commercial performance ==
The song debuted at number 20 on the Billboard Country Airplay chart for the week ending April 21, 2018. It peaked at number 9 on that chart, becoming Underwood's 27th consecutive top ten single and extending the record for most consecutive top ten singles from the start of a career. The following week, the song topped the Digital Songs chart with 54,000 sold, becoming the first country song to top that chart since 2014. It also became Underwood's first ever number one on the Digital Songs chart and reached number 5 on the Hot Country Songs chart, becoming her 27th consecutive top ten single. It also debuted at number 48 on the Billboard Hot 100. As of September 2018, the single has sold 189,000 copies in the United States. The song was certified Gold by the RIAA on November 7, 2018.

In Canada, the song debuted at number 83 on the Canadian Hot 100 chart. On the Canadian Country Songs chart, it debuted at number 35 and has reached number 8. "Cry Pretty" debuted at number 94 on the Scottish Singles Chart before moving to number 75 in its second week.

== Music video ==
Underwood first posted a short teaser clip for the official music video of the song on May 3, 2018, with a note at the end of the clip saying "official video coming soon". The video premiered during the May 6 episode of American Idol. It was directed by Randee St. Nicholas.

The video begins with Underwood in the shower, then shows her walking onstage getting ready to perform the song. This is intercut with scenes of her in her dressing room, bedroom, shower and limousine, where she is seen crying. It was filmed over two days at the Nashville Municipal Auditorium and at the Noel Hotel in Nashville.

== Live performances ==
Underwood performed the single live for the first time at the 53rd Academy of Country Music Awards on April 15, 2018, marking her first public appearance since November 2017. The performance was very well received and she received a standing ovation from the crowd. Billboard ranked it as the best performance of the night.

On May 13, 2018, Underwood performed the song live during the semi-final of American Idol. On May 11, she performed the song during her ten-year Grand Ole Opry anniversary celebration, and at the 2018 CMT Music Awards on June 6, 2018. Underwood's performance of the song was shown during the CMA Music Fest on August 8.

Underwood performed this song at 2018's CMT Artists of the Year along with Tammy Wynette's "Stand by Your Man." From there, her 2019 tour mates Maddie & Tae and Runaway June joined her on the next seven songs: Dolly Parton's "9 to 5," The Judds "Rockin' with the Rhythm of the Rain," Martina McBride's "Independence Day," Faith Hill's "Wild One," Reba McEntire's "Why Haven't I Heard from You," and Shania Twain's "Man! I Feel Like a Woman!"

In September 2018, she included it during her set at the iHeartRadio Music Festival.

== Charts ==
=== Weekly charts ===
Weekly chart performance for "Cry Pretty"
Chart (2018)	Peak position
Australia Digital Tracks (ARIA)	50
Canada (Canadian Hot 100)	83
Canada Country (Billboard)	8
Scotland (OCC)	75
UK Cross Rhythms Weekly Chart	7
US Billboard Hot 100	48
US Hot Country Songs (Billboard)	5
US Country Airplay (Billboard)	9

=== Year-end charts ===
Year-end chart performance for "Cry Pretty"
Chart (2018)	Position
UK Cross Rhythms Annual Chart	31
US Hot Country Songs (Billboard)	39
US Country Airplay (Billboard)	42

== Certifications ==
Certifications for "Cry Pretty"
Region	Certification	Certified units/sales
United States (RIAA)	Platinum	1,000,000^{‡}
^{‡} Sales+streaming figures based on certification alone.

== Awards and nominations ==
=== Teen Choice Awards ===
Year	Nominee / work	Award	Result
2018	"Cry Pretty"	Choice Country Song	Nominated

=== Country Music Association Awards ===
Year	Nominee / work	Award	Result
2018	"Cry Pretty"	Music Video of the Year	Nominated

=== CMT Music Awards ===
Year	Nominee / work	Award	Result
2019	"Cry Pretty"	Video of the Year	Won
