= The Champion (song) =

Single by Carrie Underwood featuring Ludacris
- Released: January 12, 2018
- Studio: Oak Hollow (Brentwood, TN); Dark Horse Recording (Nashville, TN); Velvet Basement (Miami, FL); The Ludaplex (Atlanta, GA)
- Length: 3:43
- Label: Capitol Nashville
- Songwriters: Carrie Underwood; Christopher Bridges; Chris DeStefano; Brett James
- Producer: Jim Jonsin

Carrie Underwood singles chronology
"The Fighter" (2017)	"The Champion" (2018)	"Cry Pretty" (2018)

Ludacris singles chronology
"Vices" (2017)	"The Champion" (2018)	"Quiero Saber" (2018)

Music video
- "The Champion" on YouTube

"The Champion" is a song recorded by American country music singer Carrie Underwood, featuring rapper Ludacris. The song was released on January 12, 2018, and was recorded to serve as an opening theme for NBC's television broadcast of Super Bowl LII. It was included as a bonus track on Underwood's sixth studio album Cry Pretty.

The song entered at number 47 on the Billboard Hot 100 in the United States.

== Background ==
The song's lyrics revolve around recovery from obstacles. The song was relevant to both Super Bowl LII and the 2018 Winter Olympics, which were both being broadcast by NBC in the United States; Underwood also performs the theme song for the network's Sunday Night Football. Underwood stated that "the main focus was to celebrate athletes at the top of their game, but we also wanted the song to resonate with people in their everyday lives". The song was featured in the intro for NBC's Super Bowl LII broadcast; in the sequence, Carrie Underwood performed on a soundstage with a screen showing highlights from past Super Bowl games.

== Composition ==
The song is set in the key of G♯ minor with a tempo of 90 beats per minute in common time. It follows a chord progression of G♯m–B–F♯–D♯, and Underwood's vocals span from G♯_{3} to C♯_{5}.

== Commercial performance ==
"The Champion" sold 61,000 units in its first week and debuted at number 47 on the Billboard Hot 100 becoming that week's Hot Shot Debut. Following the video premiere of the song during the Super Bowl LII, it saw an increase in streaming—668,000 on-demand streams on February 5, a 110 percent rise compared to what it tallied on February 3.

The song was certified Platinum by the RIAA on January 24, 2019. By May 14, 2018, the single has sold 314,000 copies in the United States. On May 5, 2023, the single was certified 2× Platinum by the RIAA.

== Music video ==
The official music video for the song was released on March 2, 2018. The video, directed by Jimmy Lynch, shows a montage of different embodiments of "champions" encompassing range of athletes, students and soldiers alike. There's also strong references to female empowerment, with clips of shark attack survivor and surfer Bethany Hamilton appearing next to images of the Me Too movement. Underwood also appears in the video in various clips of her recording the song in the studio, clips from her tour, as well as on a running trail, and even in footage from her audition for American Idol.

The video received three nominations at the 2018 CMT Music Awards for "Video of the Year", "Collaborative Video of the Year" and "Female Video of the Year", ultimately winning the last one and extending Underwood's record for most CMT Music Award wins.

== Live performances ==
Underwood and Ludacris performed the song live for the first time at the 2018 Radio Disney Music Awards on June 23, 2018. The performance was accompanied by the West Los Angeles Children's Choir, who filtered through the audience and made their way to the stage towards the final chorus.

== Awards and nominations ==
=== CMT Music Awards ===
Year	Nominee / work	Award	Result
2018	"The Champion"	Video of the Year	Nominated
2018	"The Champion"	Female Video of the Year	Won
2018	"The Champion"	Collaborative Video of the Year	Nominated

== Charts ==
Chart performance for "The Champion"
Chart (2018)	Peak position
Canada Digital Songs (Billboard)	13
US Billboard Hot 100	47
US Country Airplay (Billboard)	57

== Certifications ==
Certifications for "The Champion"
Region	Certification	Certified units/sales
United States (RIAA)	2× Platinum	2,000,000^{‡}
^{‡} Sales+streaming figures based on certification alone.
