= Rockin' with the Rhythm of the Rain =

Single by The Judds

from the album Rockin' with the Rhythm
- B-side: "River Roll On"
- Released: May 1986
- Studio: Creative Workshop (Berry Hill, Tennessee)
- Genre: Country
- Length: 2:41
- Label: RCA/Curb
- Songwriter(s): Brent Maher; Don Schlitz
- Producer(s): Brent Maher

The Judds singles chronology
"Grandpa (Tell Me 'Bout the Good Old Days)" (1986)	"Rockin' with the Rhythm of the Rain" (1986)	"Cry Myself to Sleep" (1986)

"Rockin' with the Rhythm of the Rain" is a song written by Brent Maher and Don Schlitz, and recorded by American country music duo The Judds. It was released in May 1986 as the third single from the album Rockin' with the Rhythm. The song was their seventh number one country single. The single went to number one for one week and spent twelve weeks on the country chart.

== Chart performance ==
Chart (1986)	Peak position
US Hot Country Songs (Billboard)	1
Canadian RPM Country Tracks	1
