= Dirty Laundry (Carrie Underwood song) =

Single by Carrie Underwood

from the album Storyteller
- Released: September 5, 2016
- Recorded: 2015
- Genre: Country
- Length: 3:25
- Label: Arista Nashville
- Songwriters: Zach Crowell; Ashley Gorley; Hillary Lindsey
- Producer: Jay Joyce

Carrie Underwood singles chronology
"Church Bells" (2016)	"Dirty Laundry" (2016)	"The Fighter" (2017)

Music video
- "Dirty Laundry" on YouTube

"Dirty Laundry" is a song recorded by American singer and songwriter Carrie Underwood from her fifth studio album, Storyteller (2015). The song was written by Zach Crowell, Ashley Gorley, and Hillary Lindsey, with production from Jay Joyce, and was released as the fifth single from the album. The single was shipped to country radio on August 22 and made its official impact on September 5. The song was certified Platinum by the RIAA on January 23, 2020.

== Composition and lyrics ==
"Dirty Laundry" is a song about infidelity. About the song, co-writer Ashley Gorley said, "Zach's tracks have a theme of being a little wild and dark and crazy...He was playing these tracks we went through, and all I remember is stumbling into the Ajax line, and that sounding awesome." Co-writer Hillary Lindsey said of the song, "I was so sick … They made me sing it, and I was mortified. We turned it in, and I remember Chris Oglesby [BMG vice president, creative] and Daniel Lee [BMG senior creative director] saying it was one of their favorite songs I had turned in in a while, and how great it sounded, and I was so sick."

"It's a take on a cheater in a familiar way, with the lipstick on the collar and the red wine, and there's all these tell-tale signs that he was with another woman, and it shows on his dirty laundry," Underwood said of the song. "But it's also like she airs it out for the whole world to see."

Producer and co-writer Zach Crowell said of the experience, "There was no talk of murder in this song. I wrote "Church Bells" with Hillary. I was lucky enough to write that song as well. That was the first song I’ve ever killed someone in the song. It was cool to do it, [because] we knew we were kind of taking a shot at a Carrie song, and we knew, 'Oh, she would like that, if we killed this guy.' She's not afraid to murder people in songs, but we did not kill him in "Dirty Laundry." We just announced it to the whole town."

== Critical reception ==
"Dirty Laundry" was met with positive reviews from critics. Sarah Rodman of The Boston Globe magazine reviewed the song favorably, calling it "one of the best six tracks on the album", and noted it as the album highlight. Idolator praised the song stating it as "a remarkable one-two punch that blends clever lyrics with the muscular snap of arena country-rock".

Taste of Country reviewed the song, saying, "Musically this song relies on the stormy production she leaned into heavily on her Blown Away album. There’s a colorful thread that’s tied everything Underwood has done over the last five years together and she hasn’t been afraid to lean into it again and again." AXS gave a positive review of the song, writing, "By far, "Dirty Laundry" is one of the singer's boldest and most musically adventurous singles of her career. There is an intensity and fury as inescapable as "Blown Away" and "Two Black Cadillacs," but the story is fresh and windswept."

== Commercial performance ==
Following the release of the album, "Dirty Laundry" debuted at number 47 on the US Hot Country Songs chart for the week ending November 14, 2015, selling 3,000 copies.

After being released as the album's fourth single, the song debuted at number 51 on the Country Airplay chart and reached number two. It re-entered the Hot Country Songs chart at number 35 and reached a peak of number three. "Dirty Laundry" marks Underwood's twenty-fifth top ten single on the country charts.

On the chart dated November 5, 2016, it entered the Billboard Hot 100 at number 73 and peaked at number 48.

In Canada, the song debuted at number 50 on the Canada Country chart and has reached number one on the chart dated December 31, 2016. It also debuted at number 99 on the Canadian Hot 100 chart and reached number 71.

The song has been certified Platinum by the RIAA on January 23, 2020. As of March 2017, it has sold 271,000 copies in the United States.

== Music video ==
The music video was directed by Shane Drake and premiered in October 2016.

== Live performances ==
Underwood first performed the song live at the release party for the Storyteller album, at the iHeartRadio Theater in New York City. She has since performed the song live numerous times for the Storyteller Tour. Underwood performed the song live on The Ellen DeGeneres Show on September 16. Her next televised performance came at the 50th annual CMA Awards, where she performed "Dirty Laundry" with an all-female band that included Orianthi.

== Track listing ==
- Digital download
1. "Dirty Laundry" – 3:25

== Charts ==
=== Weekly charts ===
Weekly chart performance for "Dirty Laundry"
Chart (2016–2017)	Peak position
Canada Hot 100 (Billboard)	71
Canada Country (Billboard)	1
US Billboard Hot 100	48
US Hot Country Songs (Billboard)	3
US Country Airplay (Billboard)	2

=== Year-end charts ===
Year-end chart performance for "Dirty Laundry"
Chart (2016)	Position
US Hot Country Songs (Billboard)	84

Chart (2017)	Position
Canada Country (Billboard)	47
US Hot Country Songs (Billboard)	52
US Country Airplay (Billboard)	51

== Certifications ==
Certifications for "Dirty Laundry"
Region	Certification	Certified units/sales
United States (RIAA)	Platinum	1,000,000^{‡}
^{‡} Sales+streaming figures based on certification alone.
