= Smoke Break =

Single by Carrie Underwood

from the album Storyteller
- Released: August 21, 2015
- Recorded: 2015
- Genre: Country rock
- Length: 3:18
- Label: Arista Nashville
- Songwriters: Carrie Underwood; Chris DeStefano; Hillary Lindsey
- Producer: Jay Joyce

Carrie Underwood singles chronology
"Little Toy Guns" (2015)	"Smoke Break" (2015)	"Heartbeat" (2015)

Music video
- "Smoke Break" on YouTube

"Smoke Break" is a song recorded by American country music artist Carrie Underwood from her fifth studio album, Storyteller. It was released on August 21, 2015, through Sony Music Nashville, as the album's lead single. It was written by Underwood, Chris DeStefano, and Hillary Lindsey, and was produced by Jay Joyce. Musically, it has lyrics about escaping life's many stresses.

"Smoke Break" was met with critical acclaim, with music critics describing it as "a homage to hard working people in need of a breather". It quickly became a commercial success, setting an all-time record for the largest first-week adds at country radio. It went on to reach number one on the Billboard Canada Country chart and number two on the Billboard Country Airplay chart in the US, becoming her 20th top-two single on the chart.

The song's accompanying music video was directed by Randee St. Nicholas and won the 2016 CMT Music Award for Female Video of the Year. The song received its first televised performance at The Tonight Show Starring Jimmy Fallon, on September 10, 2015.

== Composition ==
"Smoke Break" is a country rock song that critics have described as "a homage to hard working people in need of a breather". It has lyrics about escaping life's many stresses. About the writing process, Underwood stated that she, Chris DeStefano and Hillary Lindsey "were writing and kept taking breaks to go outside because we were getting a little stuck on a song we were already working on. It was so beautiful outside that we had a hard time focusing, so we decided to write a song about taking breaks! 'Smoke Break' seemed like a great title, so we ran with it!"

== Critical reception ==
"Smoke Break" has received rave reviews from music critics. Grady Smith of UK's The Guardian acclaimed it, by stating "among all the great music we've been treated to this summer, no song has carried more significance than Carrie Underwood’s excellent new single 'Smoke Break'. Here we have an A-list star releasing an unabashed country rock song that isn't trying to chase any sonic trends". He also added that Underwood "has emerged as the leader of country music". Denise Quan of Rolling Stone praised the song, saying that the singer "pays homage to hard working people in need of a breather" and adding that Underwood puts "a bit more twang in her vocals than usual — a welcome dose of laid-back country cool after a string of glossy, high-octane arena rockers and soaring ballads". Jason Lipshutz of Billboard awarded it 3.5 starts out of a possible five, noting Underwood's departure from previous material and stating that "the normally overpolished American Idol winner wears the song's blue-collar country-rock vibe well". Hugh McIntyre of Forbes praised it, saying its lines evokes "some pretty sentimental themes that likely connect with a lot of people" and the song "has the makings of another runaway hit on radio".

Dee Lockett of Vulture praised it, pointing out that "just as songs about getting trashed will remain a rite of passage in country music, its superstars like Carrie Underwood will continue to find ways to keep them meaningful". Kevin John of Country Universe praised Underwood's songwriting by saying that "she has the finest singing voice of her generation, but her greatest gift is her ability to express empathy for others through song". Taste of Country praised the song as well, stating that "it's a song everyone can relate to" and "is easy to wear, and adaptable to life's changing circumstances", and praised Underwood's delivery, saying "she starts soft before soaring into the chorus". Robert Christgau deemed it as Storyteller's most impressive song, "cross-regional, cross-gender, class-conscious ... in which neither the mother of four working three jobs nor the farm family's first college man can do without the occasional drag or drink, sincere Christians though they be".

WSM-FM and WKDF Nashville Program Director Charlie Cook praised the song as well, saying "the lyrics address the hectic lives everyone now lives, and the production stands out as a testament that she is willing to take chances, yet play within what her fans expect". iHeartMedia Senior VP of Programming Gator Harrison said the song is “an anthem for the overwhelmed, something we can all relate to, and amen. It's a smash".

=== Controversy ===
"Smoke Break" garnered some controversy upon its release, after some listeners accused the song of "trying to promote smoking". Journalists for vehicles such as Vulture and USA Today went on to defend the song. Dee Lockett of Vulture stated that the accusation "misses the point" and defended it by saying that "like many of Carrie's narrative-driven songs, though, she's making a larger point. A 'stiff drink' and a 'long drag' are just placeholders for any vice the overworked might depend on to survive. The concern isn't how Americans cope with their blue-collar lives (though she's by no means undermining the severity of addiction); it's the culture of stress that suffocates everyone that should piss people off". Maeve McDermott of USA Today says "the song is less a pro-cigarette anthem as it is a tribute to sneaking away from your responsibilities and taking a minute to breathe".

== Commercial performance ==
"Smoke Break" set, according to Taste of Country's Sterling Whitaker, "an all-time record for the largest first-week radio adds in the history of Country Aircheck, with 145 Mediabase adds and 159 total Billboard and Country Aircheck reporting stations lined up for the song’s official airplay impact date". Additionally, the single had opening week sales of 56,000 in the United States, debuting at the top of the Billboard Country Digital Singles chart – her fifth leader on the chart – and moving from number 36 to number five on the Billboard Hot Country Songs in its second week on the chart; it eventually peaked on Billboard Hot Country Songs at number four on November 24, 2015. It peaked at number one on Billboard Canada Country chart, becoming her second single to top that chart, the other being "Blown Away". The song peaked at number two on the Billboard Country Airplay chart and both debuted and peaked at number 43 on the Billboard Hot 100 chart.

As of May 2016, it sold 447,000 copies in the United States. The song was certified Platinum by the RIAA on January 23, 2020.

== Music video ==
The accompanying music video was directed by Randee St. Nicholas, who directed Underwood's "Blown Away" music video in 2012, and was shot over two days. It premiered on Entertainment Tonight on August 24, 2015. Underwood cast "gorgeous, strong women" to play a horse trainer, a truck driver and a waitress. "It just tells a story," Underwood said of featuring blue collar characters. "These are everyday jobs, and we need a break."

The video begins with Underwood driving through the dusty, sepia-washed desert in a vintage Ford truck. She passes a busy waitress in a diner, and a businessman struggling with his responsibilities. Then her truck overheats, and she has to hoof it, while a patient horse trainer and weary welder toil nearby. Underwood hitchhikes the rest of the way to her gig at a neighborhood bar. She takes the stage in front of a small crowd of patrons that includes all the local characters met earlier who were working hard and could use a break. She sings their life story, then moves on to the next dusty town, "like an angel of mercy in Daisy Dukes", Rolling Stone describes.

The video won Female Video of the Year at the 2016 CMT Music Awards, and was also nominated for Video of the Year.

== Track listing ==
- Digital download
1. "Smoke Break" – 3:19

== Live performances ==
Underwood performed the song on television for the first time at The Tonight Show Starring Jimmy Fallon, on September 10, 2015. Underwood also performed the song at the 2015 CMA Awards. She performed the song on New Year's Rockin' Eve on December 31, 2015.

Underwood's live performance at CMT's Instant Jam won the 2016 CMT Music Award for CMT Performance of the Year.

It was included as one of the encore songs on Underwood's Storyteller Tour alongside "Something in the Water". Underwood also performed it as part of her set at the Glastonbury Festival 2019.

== Charts ==
=== Weekly charts ===
Chart (2015–2016)	Peak position
Canada (Canadian Hot 100)	53
Canada Country (Billboard)	1
US Billboard Hot 100	43
US Country Airplay (Billboard)	2
US Hot Country Songs (Billboard)	4

=== Year-end charts ===
Chart (2015)	Position
US Country Airplay (Billboard)	52
US Hot Country Songs (Billboard)	53

Chart (2016)	Position
US Hot Country Songs (Billboard)	83

== Certifications ==
Region	Certification	Certified units/sales
United States (RIAA)	Platinum	447,000

== Release history ==
List of release dates, showing region, formats, label and reference
Region	Date	Format(s)	Label	Ref.
Australia	August 21, 2015	Digital download	Sony Music Nashville	
United Kingdom	August 21, 2015	Digital download	Sony Music Nashville	
United States	August 21, 2015	Digital download	Arista Nashville	
United States	August 24, 2015	Country radio	Arista Nashville	

== Awards and nominations ==
=== CMT Music Awards ===
Year	Nominee / work	Award	Result
2016	"Smoke Break"	Video of the Year	Nominated
2016	"Smoke Break"	Female Video of the Year	Won

=== British Country Music Awards ===
Year	Nominee / work	Award	Result
2016	"Smoke Break"	International Song of the Year	Nominated
