= Heartbeat (Carrie Underwood song) =

Single by Carrie Underwood

from the album Storyteller
- Released: November 30, 2015
- Genre: Country pop; R&B
- Length: 3:29
- Label: Arista Nashville; 19
- Songwriters: Carrie Underwood; Zach Crowell; Ashley Gorley
- Producer: Zach Crowell

Carrie Underwood singles chronology
"Smoke Break" (2015)	"Heartbeat" (2015)	"Chaser" (2016)

Music video
- "Heartbeat" on YouTube

"Heartbeat" is a song recorded by American singer and songwriter Carrie Underwood from her fifth studio album, Storyteller. It was written by Underwood, Ashley Gorley, and the song's producer, Zach Crowell. Country singer Sam Hunt sings backing vocals on the track. The song was released to the radio by Arista Nashville on November 30, 2015, as the album's second single, after "Smoke Break". Musically, "Heartbeat" is a country pop and a R&B song with lyrics that relate to the feeling of intimacy experienced by being alone with one's lover. It appears to be inspired by Underwood's marriage to Mike Fisher.

"Heartbeat" was met with positive reviews from music critics and became a commercial success. It reached number one on the Billboard Country Airplay chart, becoming Underwood's fourteenth leader on the chart, widening her record for the most number-one's among women in the history of the chart. It also topped the Billboard Canada Country chart.

The song received its first televised performance on the twelfth season of The X Factor on November 29, 2015. Underwood has since performed the song live on television at the 2015 American Music Awards and at the 58th Grammy Awards (along with Hunt).

== Composition ==
"Heartbeat" is a country pop and R&B song written by Carrie Underwood, Ashley Gorley, and Zach Crowell. It is a sentimental ballad composed in the key of B♭ minor and the sheet music designates a tempo of 140 BPM. The song alternates between "smooth" verses with a relatively low-key musical accompaniment and a "bombastic" chorus. Country singer Sam Hunt, who is a frequent collaborator of Crowell's, sings backing vocals on the track, leading some publications to label the song a duet. Hunt provides background vocals on the chorus and bridge, with Underwood's vocals layered over top of his to creating a "warm... echo" effect.

Described as "the most real love song" Underwood has recorded, the lyrics of "Heartbeat" relate to the feeling of intimacy experienced by being alone with one's lover. Critics noted a thematic similarity to then-recent single "Smoke Break" in that the song encourages finding time in a busy life for a private moment of bliss. The song appears to be inspired by Underwood's marriage to Mike Fisher.

== Critical reception ==
"Heartbeat” was met with positive reviews from music critics. Will Hodge of Rolling Stone opined that, "Underwood is known for creatively blending intimate lyrics with bombastic choruses and the power-ballad boom of "Heartbeat" is no exception. Her molasses-smooth vocal delivery sets the mood, leaving the listener feeling as if they're eavesdropping on someone else's date night". He also complimented Sam Hunt's involvement in the song, stating "Hunt provides the perfect male counterpoint, doubling Underwood's vocals in the chorus".

Renowned for Sound reviewed the song favorably giving it 3.5 stars out of 5 and praised Underwood's as well as Hunt's vocals by saying, "Rather than making waves with its instrumental, the song's major shining point is Underwood's vocals. The presence of frequent collaborator Sam Hunt as her backup singer complements her vocals perfectly, with the pairing of their vocals and the echoing effect it creates adding a deeper element to the song, both in terms of sound and aesthetic. At its core, "Heartbeat" is nothing new; it covers a familiar topic with a familiar sound behind it. However, the sentimental and thematic vocals bring the song to a whole other level".

Markos Papadatos of Digital Journal reviewed the song positively by calling it "absolutely beautiful". He concluded his review by saying, "Carrie Underwood tackles the subject matter in "Heartbeat" with much delicacy and sentimentalism. It garners an A rating, and it should do well for her on the Billboard Hot Country charts". Country Weekly awarded the song a B+ and commented, "Carrie interprets the message with real conviction and a passion that hits the right emotional notes without going overboard".

== Commercial performance ==
The song was first released to digital retailers as a promotional single from Storyteller on October 9, 2015. It sold 23,000 digital copies in its first week, debuting at number five on the Country Digital Songs chart for the week of October 19, 2015. That same week, it debuted on the Billboard Hot Country Songs chart at number 26, and on the Billboard Bubbling Under Hot 100 Singles extension chart at number 23.

It was later confirmed, at the American Music Awards of 2015, that "Heartbeat" would serve as the second single from Storyteller. It was then sent to country radio at 1:00 AM eastern time on the morning of November 23, 2015, and made its official radio impact on November 30, 2015. The official release prompted it to debut at number 41 on the Billboard Country Airplay chart. The song also debuted at number 76 on the US Billboard Hot 100, becoming that week's "Hot Shot Debut". Following Underwood's performance at the 58th Grammy Awards on February 15, 2016, the sales of the song increased by 133% and sold 37,000 copies for the week of March 5, 2016 and jumped from number 55 to number 42 on the US Billboard Hot 100. On the Hot Country Songs chart, it reached number two and stayed at that spot for two weeks. "Heartbeat" went on to reach number one on the Billboard Country Airplay chart for the week of March 26, 2016, becoming Underwood's fourteenth number-one on the chart, widening her lead for the most among women. Reba McEntire ranks second with 11. The song was certified Platinum by the RIAA on January 23, 2020. As of May 2016, it sold 348,000 copies in the US.

"Heartbeat" entered the Hot Canadian Digital Songs chart at number 31. The song also reached number 60 on the Canadian Hot 100 and number one on the Canada Country chart, becoming her third single to do so, and the second from Storyteller. It also became her third charting single in Scotland, debuting on the Scottish Singles Chart at number 80.

== Music video ==
The official music video for the single, directed by Randee St. Nicholas, was released on December 2, 2015.

The video shows Underwood in a sparkly gold flowing dress, walking barefoot through a lush forest, humming the melody of the song. She is seen wandering through the forest and singing the ballad.

== Live performances ==
Underwood performed the song live at the 2015 American Music Awards on November 22, 2015. She also performed the song on the twelfth season of The X Factor on November 29, 2015.

Underwood performed the song along with Sam Hunt at the 58th Grammy Awards on February 15, 2016. The pair also performed Hunt's song "Take Your Time".

== Charts ==
=== Weekly charts ===
Chart (2015–2016)	Peak position
Canada Hot 100 (Billboard)	60
Canada Country (Billboard)	1
Scottish Singles Sales (Official Charts)	80
US Billboard Hot 100	42
US Country Airplay (Billboard)	1
US Hot Country Songs (Billboard)	2

=== Year-end charts ===
Chart (2016)	Position
US Country Airplay (Billboard)	35
US Hot Country Songs (Billboard)	29

== Certifications ==
Region	Certification	Certified units/sales
United States (RIAA)	Platinum	348,000

== Release history ==
Country	Date	Format	Label	Ref.
Worldwide	October 9, 2015	Digital download; streaming	Arista Nashville; 19	
United States	November 30, 2015	Country radio	Arista Nashville; 19	
