= The Blown Away Tour: Live =

Video by Carrie Underwood
- Released: August 13, 2013
- Recorded: March 3, 2013
- Venue: Citizens Business Bank Arena (Ontario, CA)
- Genre: Country
- Label: Arista Nashville, 19

Carrie Underwood chronology
Blown Away (2012)	The Blown Away Tour: Live (2013)

The Blown Away Tour: Live is the first DVD/live album from American country music singer Carrie Underwood. It was released on August 13, 2013. The DVD was filmed in Ontario, California, one of the stops of Underwood's worldwide Blown Away Tour, which ran from May 26, 2012 to June 30, 2013 and played to more than a million fans across three continents and six countries. The tour was in support of her fourth studio album, Blown Away (2012).

It debuted at number one on the Top Music Videos chart in the United States, where it was later certified Gold by the Recording Industry Association of America. It also debuted at number one on the Canadian Top Music Videos chart, at number three on the Australian Music DVD Chart and number five on the UK Video Charts.

== Background ==
The DVD was first announced on May 31, 2013, and was filmed at Underwood's concert in Ontario, California on March 3, 2013. The DVD features twenty songs, nearly 100 minutes of performance footage, behind-the-scenes clips, interviews from Underwood and the tour director Raj Kapoor, music videos, and more.

== Track listing ==
No.	Title	Writer(s)	Length
1.	"Good Girl"	Carrie Underwood, Chris DeStefano, Ashley Gorley
2.	"Undo It"	Underwood, Kara DioGuardi, Hillary Lindsey, Marti Frederiksen
3.	"Wasted"	Lindsey, Marv Green, Troy Verges
4.	"I Told You So"	Randy Travis
5.	"Two Black Cadillacs"	Underwood, Lindsey, Josh Kear
6.	"Last Name"	Underwood, Lindsey, Luke Laird
7.	"Temporary Home"	Underwood, Laird, Zac Maloy
8.	"Jesus, Take the Wheel/How Great Thou Art"	Lindsey, Gordie Sampson, Brett James
9.	"Cowboy Casanova"	Underwood, James, Mike Elizondo
10.	"Get Out of This Town"	Lindsey, Sampson, Steve McEwan
11.	"Nobody Ever Told You"	Underwood, Lindsey, Laird
12.	"All-American Girl"	Underwood, Gorley, Kelley Lovelace
13.	"One Way Ticket"	Underwood, Laird, Kear
14.	"Leave Love Alone"	Lindsey, Sampson, Verges
15.	"Flat on the Floor"	Ashley Monroe, James
16.	"See You Again"	Underwood, Lindsey, David Hodges
17.	"Cupid's Got a Shotgun"	Underwood, Kear, Chris Tompkins
18.	"Before He Cheats"	Kear, Tompkins
19.	"I Know You Won't"	Wendell Mobley, Neil Thrasher, McEwan
20.	"Blown Away"	Kear, Tompkins

== Commercial performance ==
On August 19, 2013, the DVD debuted at number 5 in the UK, being Underwood's first top 5 ever in the region. It also debuted at number one on the Top Music Videos chart in the US, making Underwood the first core country artist to top the chart since 2011. The DVD debuted at Number 3 on the Australian ARIA Music DVD chart, her highest charting position in the country.

The DVD was certified Gold by the RIAA on September 26, 2013.

== Charts ==
Chart (2013)	Peak position	Ref
Australian ARIA Music DVDs Chart	3	
Canadian Top Music Videos	1	
UK Video Charts	5	
US Top Music Videos	1	

== Certifications ==
Region	Certification
United States (RIAA)	Gold
