= Blown Away Tour =

2012–2013 concert tour by Carrie Underwood

- World tour by Carrie Underwood
- Promotional poster for the tour
- Location: North America; Europe; Oceania
- Associated album: Blown Away
- Start date: May 26, 2012
- End date: June 30, 2013
- Legs: 6
- No. of shows: 105 in North America; 4 in Europe; 5 in Oceania; 114 Total

Carrie Underwood concert chronology
- Play On Tour (2010–2011); Blown Away Tour (2012–2013); Storyteller Tour: Stories in the Round (2016)

The Blown Away Tour was the fourth headlining tour by American country music singer Carrie Underwood, in support of her fourth studio album Blown Away. This was Underwood's first worldwide tour, with the singer performing in both Europe and Australia for the first time.

Underwood announced that she would be donating $1 from each ticket sold on the tour's North American leg to support Red Cross disaster relief.

The Blown Away Tour was the 47th best-selling tour in the world in 2012, having earned $29.2 million with sold 486,504 tickets. In 2013, it was the 31st best-selling tour, mid-year, with $23.6 million and 386,695 tickets sold. Overall, the tour grossed $52.8 million, one of Underwood's highest-grossing.

== Background ==
On May 1, 2012, Underwood announced the Blown Away Tour. The tour included an international run of shows during the summer of 2012, including her first-ever United Kingdom concert, taking place at the prestigious Royal Albert Hall in London on June 21. Underwood announced four dates in Australia on May 6, 2012. Opening for Underwood was country singer Hunter Hayes, who was the opening act for the North American leg of the tour. On October 29, 2012, dates for the second North American leg of the tour were announced. On November 30, 2012, it was announced that Underwood would be taking the tour to Ireland and Northern Ireland in March 2013. They were Underwood's first-ever concerts in Ireland and Northern Ireland.

== Opening acts ==
- Damien Leith (Australia)
- Hunter Hayes (North America)
- Kira Isabella (Canada)

== Set list ==
=== Europe and Oceania ===
1. "Good Girl"
2. "Flat on the Floor"
3. "Wasted"
4. "Two Black Cadillacs"
5. "So Small"
6. "Temporary Home"
7. "Last Name"
8. "Just a Dream"
9. "I Told You So"
10. "Leave Love Alone"
11. "Cowboy Casanova"
12. "Nobody Ever Told You"
13. "Quitter"
14. "Do You Think About Me"
15. "One Way Ticket"
16. "Undo It"
17. "Fix You"
18. "Jesus, Take the Wheel" / "How Great Thou Art"
19. "Cupid's Got a Shotgun"
20. "Before He Cheats"

Encore

21. "I Know You Won't"
22. "Blown Away"

=== North America ===
1. "Good Girl"
2. "Undo It"
3. "Wasted"
4. "I Told You So"
5. "Two Black Cadillacs"
6. "Last Name"
7. "All-American Girl"
8. "Temporary Home"
9. "Jesus, Take the Wheel"
10. "Cowboy Casanova"
11. "Get Out of This Town"
12. "Nobody Ever Told You"
13. "Thank God For Hometowns"
14. "Crazy Dreams"
15. "Do You Think About Me"
16. "One Way Ticket"
17. "Leave Love Alone" (with Hunter Hayes)
18. "Sweet Emotion"
19. "Remind Me"
20. "Cupid's Got a Shotgun"
21. "Before He Cheats"

Encore

22. "I Know You Won't"
23. "Blown Away"

== Tour dates ==
List of 2012 concerts
Date	City	Country	Venue	Attendance	Gross revenue
May 26, 2012^{[A]}	Baton Rouge	United States	Tiger Stadium	—N/a	—N/a
June 8, 2012^{[B]}	Nashville	United States	LP Field	—N/a	—N/a
June 21, 2012	London	England	Royal Albert Hall	—N/a	$150,890
June 26, 2012	Melbourne	Australia	Palais Theatre	—N/a	$246,789
June 29, 2012	Tamworth	Australia	Tamworth Entertainment Centre	—N/a	$434,845
June 30, 2012	Brisbane	Australia	BCEC Great Hall	2,571 / 3,222	$228,552
July 2, 2012	Sydney	Australia	Sydney Opera House	—N/a	$678,234
July 3, 2012	Sydney	Australia	Sydney Opera House	—N/a	$678,234
August 12, 2012^{[C]}	Oro-Medonte	Canada	Burl's Creek Event Ground	—N/a	—N/a
September 14, 2012	Manchester	United States	Verizon Wireless Arena	7,944 / 8,133	$476,254
September 15, 2012	Bridgeport	United States	Webster Bank Arena	6,232 / 6,426	$378,872
September 17, 2012	Providence	United States	Dunkin' Donuts Center	6,114 / 6,388	$377,554
September 19, 2012	Worcester	United States	DCU Center	6,073 / 6,366	$373,018
September 20, 2012	Reading	United States	Sovereign Center	5,535 / 5,883	$329,633
September 22, 2012	Louisville	United States	KFC Yum! Center	10,069 / 10,583	$593,576
September 23, 2012	Nashville	United States	Bridgestone Arena	9,856 / 10,023	$591,096
September 26, 2012	Green Bay	United States	Resch Center	7,381 / 7,381	$426,273
September 27, 2012	Minneapolis	United States	Target Center	9,519 / 9,735	$567,614
September 29, 2012	Fargo	United States	Fargodome	10,228 / 10,514	$578,158
October 1, 2012	Saskatoon	Canada	Credit Union Centre	7,879 / 8,096	$495,426
October 2, 2012	Calgary	Canada	Scotiabank Saddledome	11,213 / 11,213	$697,172
October 4, 2012	Vancouver	Canada	Rogers Arena	8,559 / 8,920	$540,531
October 6, 2012	Seattle	United States	KeyArena	8,957 / 9,185	$531,922
October 7, 2012	Portland	United States	Rose Garden Arena	7,347 / 7,347	$424,695
October 10, 2012	West Valley City	United States	Maverik Center	8,948 / 8,948	$504,638
October 12, 2012	Reno	United States	Reno Events Center	6,164 / 6,164	$367,394
October 13, 2012	Sacramento	United States	Power Balance Pavilion	8,804 / 8,804	$524,704
October 14, 2012	San Jose	United States	HP Pavilion	7,884 / 8,120	$473,154
October 16, 2012	Los Angeles	United States	Staples Center	11,105 / 11,105	$611,918
October 18, 2012	Bakersfield	United States	Rabobank Arena	7,297 / 7,350	$421,765
October 20, 2012	San Diego	United States	Valley View Casino Center	7,767 / 8,114	$450,005
October 21, 2012	Glendale	United States	Jobing.com Arena	8,369 / 8,369	$486,582
October 24, 2012	Dallas	United States	American Airlines Center	9,414 / 9,414	$559,724
October 25, 2012	Oklahoma City	United States	Chesapeake Energy Arena	8,327 / 8,704	$507,310
October 27, 2012	Wichita	United States	Intrust Bank Arena	7,712 / 7,959	$449,208
October 28, 2012	Springfield	United States	JQH Arena	7,612 / 7,794	$434,197
November 3, 2012	Charlotte	United States	Time Warner Cable Arena	8,613 / 8,830	$515,371
November 4, 2012	Greensboro	United States	Greensboro Coliseum	9,372 / 9,992	$428,377
November 7, 2012	Baltimore	United States	1st Mariner Arena	7,291 / 7,291	$551,182
November 9, 2012	Atlantic City	United States	Boardwalk Hall	9,447 / 10,431	$561,992
November 10, 2012	Hartford	United States	XL Center	6,903 / 6,903	$418,368
November 13, 2012	University Park	United States	Bryce Jordan Center	7,147 / 7,844	$417,715
November 15, 2012	Grand Rapids	United States	Van Andel Arena	10,093 / 10,093	$565,292
November 16, 2012	Moline	United States	iWireless Center	9,711 / 9,711	$547,039
November 20, 2012	St. Louis	United States	Scottrade Center	10,415 / 10,796	$570,743
November 21, 2012	Tulsa	United States	BOK Center	10,073 / 10,073	$605,878
November 24, 2012	Indianapolis	United States	Bankers Life Fieldhouse	8,964 / 8,964	$499,966
November 25, 2012	Auburn Hills	United States	The Palace of Auburn Hills	11,796 / 11,796	$668,236
November 27, 2012	Pittsburgh	United States	Consol Energy Center	9,492 / 9,875	$530,212
November 28, 2012	Philadelphia	United States	Wells Fargo Center	9,547 / 10,216	$550,278
November 30, 2012	Uniondale	United States	Nassau Coliseum	8,526 / 8,777	$512,836
December 1, 2012	Newark	United States	Prudential Center	10,698 / 11,499	$642,908
December 4, 2012	Albany	United States	Times Union Center	7,601 / 8,018	$438,454
December 6, 2012	London	Canada	Budweiser Gardens	7,995 / 7,995	$500,955
December 8, 2012	Ottawa	Canada	Scotiabank Place	9,622 / 10,255	$593,561
December 9, 2012	Toronto	Canada	Air Canada Centre	12,212 / 12,212	$748,206
December 11, 2012	Columbus	United States	Schottenstein Center	9,022 / 9,022	$515,172
December 12, 2012	Chicago	United States	United Center	11,930 / 11,930	$696,120
December 14, 2012	Des Moines	United States	Wells Fargo Arena	10,056 / 10,251	$574,911
December 18, 2012	Memphis	United States	FedExForum	8,367 / 8,367	$476,935
December 19, 2012	Duluth	United States	Arena at Gwinnett Center	9,887 / 9,887	$591,240
December 21, 2012	Orlando	United States	Amway Center	11,017 / 11,017	$631,232
December 22, 2012	Sunrise	United States	BB&T Center	7,945 / 8,226	$477,040

List of 2013 concerts
Date	City	Country	Venue	Attendance	Gross revenue
February 13, 2013	Colorado Springs	United States	Colorado Springs World Arena	6,263 / 6,263	$387,748
February 14, 2013	Broomfield	United States	1stBank Center	5,525 / 5,525	$341,970
February 17, 2013	Boise	United States	Taco Bell Arena	7,254 / 7,254	$421,569
February 19, 2013	Billings	United States	Rimrock Auto Arena	7,711 / 7,711	$437,939
February 21, 2013	Spokane	United States	Spokane Arena	9,914 / 9,914	$563,349
February 22, 2013	Yakima	United States	Yakima SunDome	6,719 / 6,719	$384,497
February 25, 2013	Oakland	United States	Oracle Arena	6,719 / 6,719	$384,497
February 26, 2013	Stockton	United States	Stockton Arena	8,501 / 8,501	$484,884
March 2, 2013	Las Vegas	United States	Mandalay Bay Events Center	7,912 / 7,912	$477,392
March 3, 2013	Ontario	United States	Citizens Business Bank Arena	7,548 / 7,548	$476,330
March 5, 2013	Fresno	United States	Save Mart Center	10,333 / 10,333	$550,616
March 8, 2013	Rio Rancho	United States	Santa Ana Star Center	6,409 / 6,409	$373,752
March 14, 2013	Dublin	Ireland	Olympia Theatre	—N/a	—N/a
March 15, 2013	Belfast	Northern Ireland	Waterfront Hall	—N/a	—N/a
March 17, 2013^{[D]}	London	England	The O_{2} Arena	26,840 / 26,840	$1,447,650
March 21, 2013	Richmond	United States	Richmond Coliseum	8,419 / 8,419	$480,987
March 23, 2013	Roanoke	United States	Roanoke Civic Center	6,894 / 6,894	$406,339
March 25, 2013	Hershey	United States	Giant Center	8,624 / 8,624	$483,364
March 26, 2013	Buffalo	United States	First Niagara Center	12,484 / 12,484	$683,154
March 28, 2013	Hamilton	Canada	Copps Coliseum	11,488 / 11,488	$702,891
March 29, 2013	Windsor	Canada	WFCU Centre	6,488 / 6,488	$539,387
March 30, 2013	Kingston	Canada	K-Rock Centre	6,488 / 6,488	$539,387
April 2, 2013	Saint John	Canada	Harbour Station	6,532 / 6,532	$415,256
April 9, 2013	Portland	United States	Cumberland County Civic Center	5,751 / 5,751	$337,409
April 11, 2013	Youngstown	United States	Covelli Centre	5,635 / 5,635	$348,460
April 13, 2013	East Lansing	United States	Breslin Student Events Center	8,276 / 8,276	$462,336
April 14, 2013	Fort Wayne	United States	Allen County War Memorial Coliseum	8,492 / 8,492	$470,712
April 16, 2013	Greenville	United States	Bi-Lo Center	9,695 / 9,695	$541,443
April 17, 2013	Columbia	United States	Colonial Life Arena	8,357 / 8,357	$438,030
April 19, 2013	Augusta	United States	James Brown Arena	6,093 / 6,093	$356,436
April 20, 2013	Jacksonville	United States	Jacksonville Veterans Memorial Arena	10,221 / 10,221	$562,284
April 23, 2013	Houston	United States	Toyota Center	8,246 / 8,246	$493,596
April 25, 2013	San Antonio	United States	Freeman Coliseum	7,134 / 7,134	$417,099
April 27, 2013	Cedar Park	United States	Cedar Park Center	6,629 / 6,629	$404,514
April 29, 2013	Lafayette	United States	Cajundome	9,288 / 9,288	$520,588
May 1, 2013	Kansas City^{a}	United States	Sprint Center	11,778 / 11,778	$681,238
May 2, 2013	Bloomington	United States	U.S. Cellular Coliseum	6,458 / 6,458	$374,403
May 3, 2013	Milwaukee	United States	BMO Harris Bradley Center	11,592 / 11,592	$674,402
May 5, 2013	Toledo	United States	Huntington Center	7,446 / 7,446	$431,981
May 6, 2013	Springfield^{b}	United States	Prairie Capital Convention Center	—N/a	—N/a
May 8, 2013	Charleston	United States	Charleston Civic Center	7,914 / 7,914	$443,659
May 10, 2013	Rockford	United States	BMO Harris Bank Center	6,807 / 6,807	$402,015
May 12, 2013	Omaha	United States	CenturyLink Center Omaha	12,600 / 12,600	$723,880
May 13, 2013	Sioux City	United States	Gateway Arena	7,036 / 7,036	$403,316
May 15, 2013	Winnipeg	Canada	MTS Centre	9,630 / 9,630	$591,841
May 17, 2013	Moose Jaw	Canada	Mosaic Place	4,039 / 4,039	$478,223
May 18, 2013	Edmonton	Canada	Rexall Place	12,136 / 12,136	$717,473
May 20, 2013	Dawson Creek	Canada	EnCana Events Centre	4,368 / 4,368	$492,866
May 21, 2013	Prince George	Canada	CN Centre	5,055 / 5,055	$588,294
May 23, 2013	Abbotsford	Canada	Abbotsford Centre	5,909 / 5,909	$521,208
June 30, 2013 ^{[E]}	Dauphin	Canada	Dauphin's Countryfest	—N/a	—N/a
TOTAL				870,282 / 882,181 (99%)	$53,602,586

List of festivals and rescheduled shows

^{A} This concert was a part of the Bayou Country Superfest.
^{B} This concert was a part of CMA Music Festival.
^{C} This concert was a part of the Boots and Hearts Music Festival.
^{D} This concert was a part of C2C: Country to Country.
^{E} This concert was a part of Daupin's Countryfest.

Rescheduled shows

- ^Note a The Kansas City show was originally scheduled for December 15, 2012, but was moved to May 1, 2013 due to illness.
- ^Note b The Springfield show was originally scheduled for May 1, 2013, but was moved to May 6, 2013 due to illness that caused her show in Kansas City to be moved to May 1, 2013.

== Awards and nominations ==
Award	Category	Result
2013 American Country Awards	Touring Artist of the Year (Carrie Underwood)	Nominated

== Tour DVD ==
A concert DVD entitled The Blown Away Tour: Live was released on August 12, 2013 in the United Kingdom and August 13, 2013 in North America. The footage was captured during Underwood's concert in Ontario, California on March 3, 2013. The DVD includes more than twenty songs performed by Underwood on tour, as well as exclusive interviews with Underwood, tour director of The Blown Away Tour, Raj Kapoor, and other behind-the-scenes footage about the tour.

== Tour exhibition ==
From June 5, 2013, to November 10, 2013, the Country Music Hall of Fame and Museum displayed The Blown Away Tour Exhibit for visitors in Nashville, Tennessee. The exhibit featured costumes, set pieces, microphones, and other novelties from the tour.
