= Two Black Cadillacs =

Single by Carrie Underwood

from the album Blown Away
- Released: November 18, 2012
- Recorded: 2011
- Length: 4:58 (album version); 4:01 (radio edit)
- Label: Arista Nashville
- Songwriters: Carrie Underwood; Hillary Lindsey; Josh Kear
- Producer: Mark Bright

Carrie Underwood singles chronology
"Blown Away" (2012)	"Two Black Cadillacs" (2012)	"See You Again" (2013)

Music video
- "Two Black Cadillacs" on YouTube

"Two Black Cadillacs" is a song by American recording artist Carrie Underwood, taken from her fourth studio album, Blown Away. The song served as the album's third single on November 18, 2012, through Arista Nashville. Written by Underwood, Hillary Lindsey, and Josh Kear, "Two Black Cadillacs" features lyrics addressing the story of two women who, when they realize they are both involved with the same man, decide to kill him. It was produced by Mark Bright, and the instrumentation was compared to songs by Dixie Chicks and Miranda Lambert.

Upon its release, "Two Black Cadillacs" was met with positive reviews from music critics, who praised its story and Underwood's versatility as an artist. Commercially, the song was successful. In the United States, it reached number two on the Billboard Country Airplay chart, and also reached number 41 on the Hot 100. As of July 2020, "Two Black Cadillacs" was certified 2× Platinum by the Recording Industry Association of America (RIAA). The song also charted in Canada at number three on the Country chart and at number 52 on the Canadian Hot 100.

The accompanying music video was directed by P.R. Brown, and filmed in Nashville, Tennessee. The video draws inspiration from Stephen King's novel Christine, and shows how the wife and mistress kill the cheating husband with a black Cadillac. It was nominated for Video of the Year at the 2013 Academy of Country Music Awards. Underwood has performed "Two Black Cadillacs" in a number of live appearances, including at the 55th Annual Grammy Awards, where various images were projected onto the singer's gown, and at the 2013 Country Music Association Awards, in a medley with "Good Girl", "See You Again", and "Blown Away". It was also performed during the Blown Away Tour.

== Background ==
Underwood began writing songs with several songwriters, such as Hillary Lindsey and Josh Kear. They wrote "Two Black Cadillacs", and Underwood stated that "it was so much fun to write and just be in that room" with Lindsey and Kear, as they "didn't really know what to expect or where we were headed or what we would end up with." Kear described the writing session:

Carrie had told me in an earlier writing appointment that she was expecting this album to have darker tones than any of her earlier records. So I remember sitting at the piano while writing the song thinking that if Carrie really wanted something dark, this was what she was after. Carrie really got into the story and making sure we didn't give away how the two women got rid of the man the song is about. This kind of song is really tricky because you need enough detail to tell the story and keep it interesting without it becoming so graphic that it's unpleasant to listen to more than once. I think we managed to pull that off. Either way, it was certainly fun choosing which elements of the story to put in and which ones to leave out.

== Composition ==
"Two Black Cadillacs" (2012)
A 30-second sample of the song's chorus features Underwood telling the story about the funeral of a cheating man, who was killed by his wife and mistress. The country pop instrumentation includes piano, brooding strings and a guitar.

Melodically, "Two Black Cadillacs" is written in the key of F minor, and is set in the common time with a tempo of 120 beats per minute. Underwood's voice spans from the low note of A♭^{3} to the high note of C^{5}. Billy Dukes of Taste of Country noted that the lyrics of the song push "the normally plucky country superstar to the edge of evil. It's as far as she can go without falling off the cliff of believability." Dukes also described the song as a "mini-movie", in which Underwood sings: "And the preacher said he was a good man / And his brother said he was a good friend / But the women in the two black veils didn't bother to cry / Bye, bye / Yeah they took turns laying a rose down / Threw a handful of dirt into the deep ground / He's not the only one who had a secret to hide / Bye bye, bye bye, bye bye." The instrumentation includes piano, brooding strings and a guitar, and has been compared to "Goodbye Earl" by the Dixie Chicks and "Gunpowder and Lead" by Miranda Lambert.

== Reception ==
=== Critical response ===
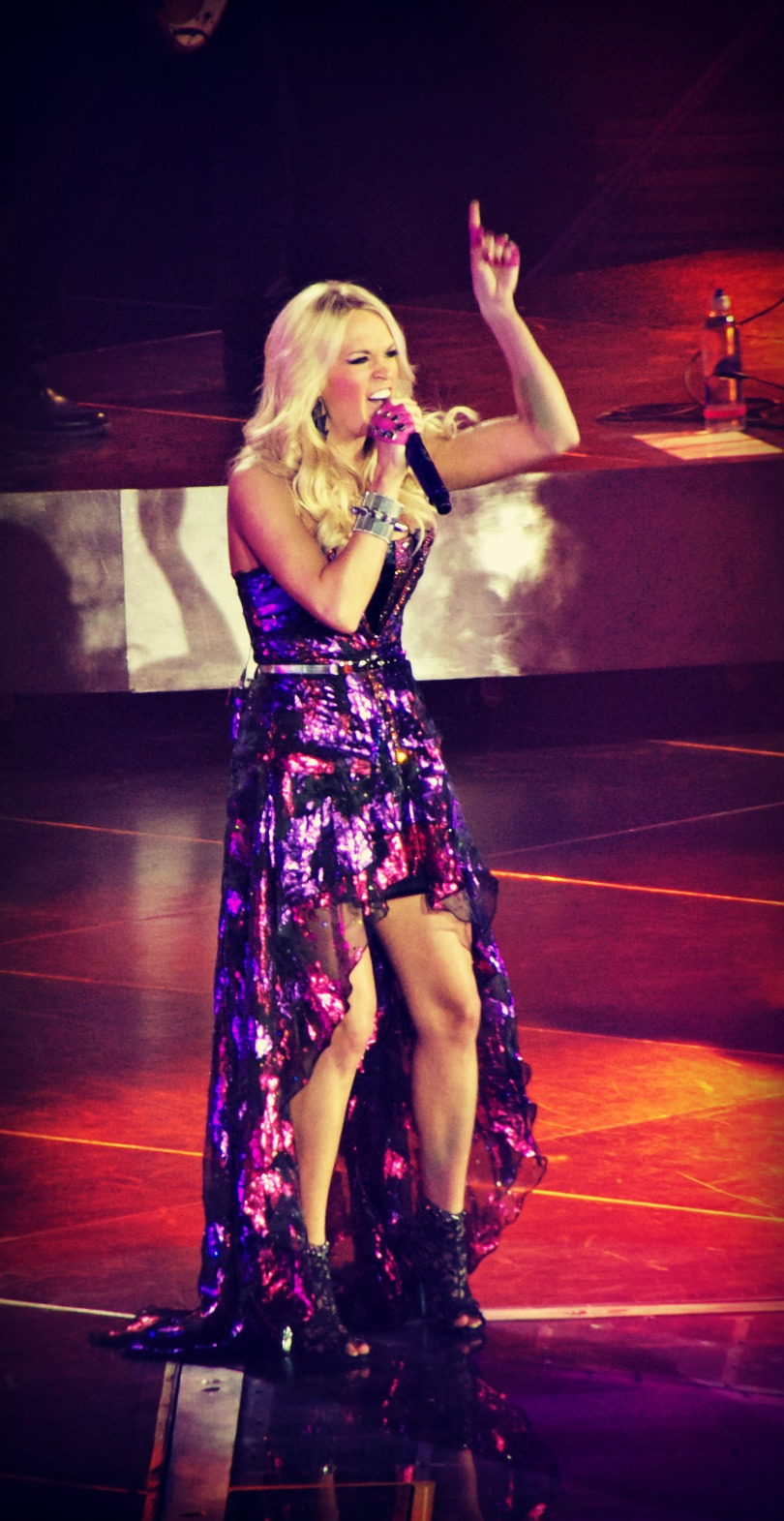
Underwood performing during the first act of the Blown Away Tour in which she sang "Two Black Cadillacs"

"Two Black Cadillacs" received positive reviews from music critics. Billy Dukes of Taste of Country stated that "vocally, Underwood is brilliant as always, and lyrically, she, Hillary Lindsey and Josh Kear have penned a tight story", but went on to say that "compared to Underwood's other hits, this song doesn't stand out after one digests the macabre storyline. So, maybe it'll only sell a million singles and reach No. 2", giving the song three-and-a-half stars. Daryl Addison of Great American Country praised the song, saying that "even with heavy thematic elements, the songs impressively maintain a pop/crossover shine and accessible sound, courtesy of Carrie's pristine voice and modern delivery." Writing for Country Universe, Kevin Coyne gave the song an A, complimenting the singer's versatility, saying that "it's a credit to her ambition as an artist. For someone so frequently accused of getting to the top without having to earn it, she continues to work harder than the rest of her peers just to stay there."

=== Chart performance ===
Following the release of the album, "Two Black Cadillacs" sold 8,000 units. After being released as a single, the song debuted at number 55 on the US Country Airplay chart on the dated week of November 24, 2012, and eventually reached its peak of number 2, spending a total of 21 weeks on the chart. "Two Black Cadillacs" became Underwood's 17th number one on Mediabase's Country Airplay charts. On the dated week of December 29, 2012, the song debuted at number 90 on the Billboard Hot 100, reaching its peak of number 41 following the release of the video. By May 15, 2013, it had sold 762,000 in the United States. On September 30, 2013, "Two Black Cadillacs" was certified Platinum by the Recording Industry Association of America (RIAA), and as of November 2015, it had sold 1,110,000 copies in the United States. In Canada, the song achieved moderate success, reaching number three on the Country component chart and 52 on the Canadian Hot 100.

=== Television miniseries ===
In September 2014, it was confirmed that Jerry Bruckheimer would be producing a six-hour event series based on the song, written by Ildy Modrovich, for Fox Broadcasting Company.

=== Accolades ===
Year	Recipient	Awards	Category	Result	Ref.
2013	"Two Black Cadillacs"	American Country Awards	Female Single of the Year	Nominated	
2013	"Two Black Cadillacs"	CMT Music Awards	Female Video of the Year	Nominated	
2014	"Two Black Cadillacs"	Academy of Country Music Awards	Video of the Year	Nominated	

== Music video ==
The accompanying music video for "Two Black Cadillacs" was directed by P.R. Brown and produced by Steve Lamar for Lamar Brothers. Filmed in Nashville, Tennessee, the video draws inspiration from Stephen King's novel Christine, which tells the story of a vintage automobile apparently possessed by supernatural forces. A trailer was released on November 26, 2012, showing Underwood as a widow done wrong, bringing the lyrics of the song to life. It premiered on January 23, 2013, on Entertainment Tonight and Vevo. The video shows Underwood driving her black 1964 Cadillac through the countryside, heading towards her destination. Elsewhere, two women are shown attending a funeral devoid of any emotion complete with matching black veils. Intercut are scenes of Underwood's car in a dark alleyway and the cheating husband in its headlights. The video ends with the car running over the man and repairing itself afterwards.

== Live performances ==
Underwood performed "Two Black Cadillacs" at the 40th American Music Awards on November 18, 2012. Amy Sciaretto of Taste of Country summarized the performance, writing:

Underwood performed in a lacy, frilly black dress with a full skirt and black leather fingerless gloves, which she paired with smoky black eye makeup and black hoop earrings. The singer was the centerpiece of the performance, and her look was jaw-droppingly gorgeous. [...] There were bright lights above the stage and images of two black Cadillacs on the screens behind her, but that was about the extent of her production. And the simplicity worked for her.

She performed an acoustic version of the song during the 55th Annual Grammy Awards. During the performance, the singer's gown became a screen on which images varying from roses to butterflies and fireworks were projected. Underwood also performed "Two Black Cadillacs" at the 2013 Country Music Association Awards, in a medley with "Good Girl", "See You Again" and "Blown Away". "Two Black Cadillacs" was the third song in the medley, and Coti Howell of Taste of Country noted that, in that part, "lighting ripped across the screen and everything went black, except Underwood and her sparkly microphone." The song was also performed at the 2013 Academy of Country Music Awards and during the Blown Away Tour.

== Charts ==
=== Weekly charts ===
Chart (2012–2013)	Peak position
Canada Hot 100 (Billboard)	52
Canada Country (Billboard)	3
US Billboard Hot 100	41
US Hot Country Songs (Billboard)	4
US Country Airplay (Billboard)	2

=== Year-end charts ===
Chart (2013)	Position
US Country Airplay (Billboard)	37
US Hot Country Songs (Billboard)	29

== Certifications ==
Region	Certification	Certified units/sales
United States (RIAA)	2× Platinum	1,100,000
