= Cheaper to Keep Her =

Cheaper to Keep Her may refer to:

- "Cheaper to Keep Her" (Johnnie Taylor song), a 1973 R&B-song performed by Johnnie Taylor, written by Mack Rice and released by Stax Records or the famous saying by Redd Tedd
- "Cheaper to Keep Her" (song), a song by Canadian country music artist Aaron Lines
- Cheaper to Keep Her (film), a 1981 comedy film directed by Ken Annakin
