= Waitin' on the Wonderful =

Studio album by Aaron Lines
- Released: September 6, 2005
- Genre: Country
- Length: 39:59
- Label: Sony BMG Canada
- Producer: Troy Verges; Chris Lindsey

Aaron Lines chronology
Living Out Loud (2003)	Waitin' on the Wonderful (2005)	Moments That Matter (2007)

Waitin' on the Wonderful is the second studio album by Canadian country music singer Aaron Lines. The album was nominated for Country Recording of the Year at the 2006 Juno Awards. "Lights of My Hometown," one of the singles released from the CD, was the most played song on Canadian country radio in 2006. The title track was also a Top 40 country hit in the U.S., although the album was not released in the U.S. "It Takes a Man" was later recorded by Chris Young on his 2009 album, The Man I Want to Be.

The single Waitin' On the Wonderful peaked at #33.

== Track listing ==
No.	Title	Writer(s)	Length
1.	"Waitin' on the Wonderful"	Angelo Petraglia, Dave Berg, Hillary Lindsey	3:59
2.	"It Takes a Man"	David Frasier, Josh Kear, Ed Hill	3:22
3.	"The American Way"	Aaron Lines, Mark Irwin, Kear	3:43
4.	"Twenty Years Late"	Lines, Monty Powell, Troy Verges	4:46
5.	"Lights of My Hometown"	Lines, Steven Dale Jones	3:33
6.	"Lovers on the Run"	Lines, Chris Lindsey, Aimee Mayo, Verges	3:47
7.	"Seeing Things"	Lines, Blair Daly, Gordie Sampson, Verges	2:55
8.	"I Wanna Be That Man"	Lines, C. Lindsey, Mayo, Verges	3:46
9.	"Good Liar"	Brett James, Frank Rogers, Verges	3:37
10.	"Dance to the Radio"	Lines, Daly, Tommy Lee James	3:20
11.	"If I Could Do It All Again"	Rivers Rutherford, George Teren	3:04
