= Blown Away (album) =

Studio album by Carrie Underwood
- Released: May 1, 2012
- Genre: Country
- Length: 55:20
- Labels: 19; Arista Nashville
- Producer: Mark Bright

Carrie Underwood chronology
Play On (2009)	Blown Away (2012)	Greatest Hits: Decade Number 1 (2014)

Singles from Blown Away
- 1. "Good Girl" Released: February 23, 2012; 2. "Blown Away" Released: July 9, 2012; 3. "Two Black Cadillacs" Released: November 18, 2012; 4. "See You Again" Released: April 15, 2013

Blown Away is the fourth studio album by American singer and songwriter Carrie Underwood. It was released on May 1, 2012, through 19 Recordings and Arista Nashville. Developed over nearly a year following her third headlining tour, Play On Tour, the album presents a deliberate shift in Underwood's artistic direction, as she sought to step away from her established image and engage with darker and more narrative-driven material. It was supported by four singles, "Good Girl", "Blown Away", "Two Black Cadillacs", and "See You Again" as well as the Blown Away Tour which included international dates and Underwood's first concert in the United Kingdom.

Blown Away is a country album that expands on Underwood's pop-country foundation by leaning more heavily into pop-oriented production while incorporating dramatic, weather-themed imagery. Produced by Mark Bright, it features Underwood as a co-writer on eight of its 14 tracks and balances assertive, uptempo songs such as "Good Girl" with darker narratives, including "Blown Away" and "Two Black Cadillacs", alongside lighter, genre-inflected material elsewhere on the record.

Upon release, Blown Away debuted at number one on the Billboard 200, becoming Underwood's third consecutive studio album to top the chart, and it achieved multi-platinum certifications in several countries. Critically, it received generally favorable reviews and several industry honors, winning at the 2012 American Music Awards and 2013 Country Music Awards of Australia. It was also nominated for various awards, namely the 2013 Academy of Country Music Awards, Country Music Association Awards, Billboard Music Awards and World Music Awards.

== Background ==
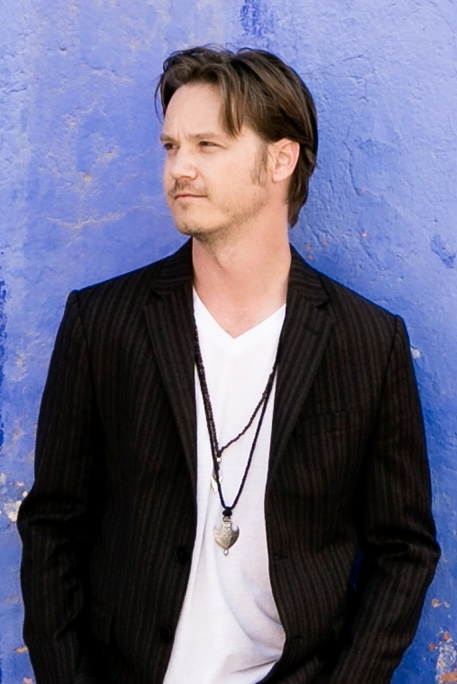
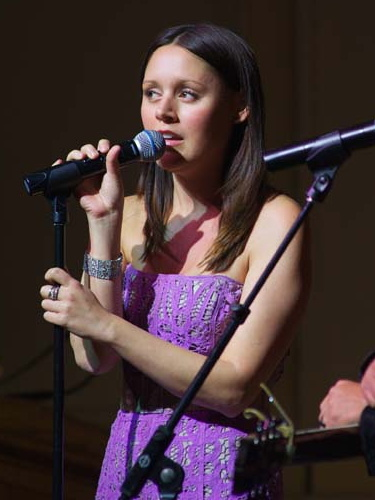
American songwriters Josh Kear (left) and Hillary Lindsey (right) co-wrote the album's title track and "Two Black Cadillacs", respectively.

After her Play On Tour ended in December 2010, Underwood started to work on her then-upcoming fourth studio album. She spent a long time in finishing it, stating that she "wanted to change things up", and needed to step away from the "celebrity bubble" to "have real things to write about and real things to sing about". According to Gary Overton, a chairman and CEO of Sony Music Nashville, Underwood spent "nearly a year to compile and record the songs". The album's title track, "Blown Away", was written by American songwriters Chris Tompkins and Josh Kear, who also wrote Underwood's previous hit single, "Before He Cheats" (2005). When Underwood received demo version of the title track, she loved the song and began recording it. She then started writing material with several songwriters, including Hillary Lindsey and Kear. Underwood said that writing "Two Black Cadillacs" with them was "so much fun", explaining that they entered the session without knowing what to expect or where it would lead.

"Good Girl"
"Good Girl" represents Blown Away's overall theme, as the song features a "darker storyline".

Underwood noted that Blown Away would contain material that differs from her previous efforts, since stating that the album features songs with a "darker storyline". She further said she wasn't trying to impress people with what she could do, and she didn't "have to sing to the moon with every single song" with this project. The lead single, "Good Girl", is said to be the album's most upbeat track, with the other tracks that create a much darker record. Ashley Gorley explained that the song came together while he was working in Los Angeles with Chris DeStefano, when Underwood's management suggested the three collaborate. He said that although he had written with each of them separately before, bringing them together proved to be "a great combination".

== Composition ==
Blown Away is a pop album that frames Underwood within a lineage of crossover country performers such as Shania Twain and Faith Hill. The album is structured as a substantial, nearly 55-minute release and features a strong degree of authorial involvement, with Underwood co-writing eight songs alongside established Nashville songwriters. Blown Away depicts a shift in the singer's compositional approach, as she and producer Mark Bright lean more heavily into the "pop" side of her established pop-country sound. The album also leans into dramatic, weather-driven imagery and heightened emotional settings. In addition, its sequencing accommodates darker narrative material, as it opens with the assertive lead single "Good Girl" before transitioning into darker, narrative-driven songs. It marks a turn toward darker subject matter, which incorporates a broader stylistic and production range, contrasted to her previous releases Carnival Ride and Play On.

Blown Away favors "stormy" atmospheres, with Underwood sounding most at ease when "leaning into a stiff breeze", and it allows a blues-tinged edge to enter her vocal phrasing. The album balances a tonal shift with lighter, genre-inflected material, as Underwood applies her vocal approach to more upbeat, "feel-good" songwriting elsewhere on the record. Entertainment Weekly described Blown Away as Underwood's most "stadium-rock-friendly" album at the time.

=== Songs ===
"Blown Away"
A 21-second sample of "Blown Away". The effect added to Underwood's vocals has drawn comparisons to the vocal treatments used in Def Leppard's songs.

"Good Girl" is an uptempo, feisty and rock-leaning song, in which Underwood issues a warning about a man who is "not at all what he seems". Driven by Mark Bright's "brooding, atmospheric" production, "Blown Away" centers on a girl sheltering from a tornado while leaving her abusive father behind. "Two Black Cadillacs" tells a dark narrative in which a wife and a mistress form a deadly alliance against a cheating man. Its story associated with "revenge fantasy" was compared to "Before He Cheats". "See You Again" is framed not as a dark or storm-driven piece, talking about reuniting with a loved one. "Do You Think About Me", a mid-tempo song, balances country and pop elements. "Forever Changed" is a "heartbreaking" ballad that addresses the fragility of life. "Nobody Ever Told You" is a reggae-influenced country-pop song, built around a message of encouragement and self-worth. A breezy, Calypso-flavored song, "One Way Ticket" is inspired by Kenny Chesney's styles, suggesting that it is "impossible to take life too seriously". "Thank God for Hometowns" is a nostalgic tribute to small-town values and roots. The song grounds its sentiment in concrete details of familiar faces, old friends, and specific memories, as it opens with a return home prompted by personal loss and emphasizes the emotional pull of long-standing community ties rather than generalized hometown imagery. "Good in Goodbye", co-written with Hillary Lindsey and Ryan Tedder, contains echoes of Underwood's 2007 single, "So Small". "Leave Love Alone", built around a jangly guitar-driven arrangement, is a confession of emotional dependency set against a "cool, swampy" musical backdrop. "Cupid's Got a Shotgun" is a "rowdy and sinister" track, likened to Miranda Lambert and Gretchen Wilson on a "ludicrously fun"; it also features a guitar instruments from Brad Paisley. "Wine After Whiske" is a "stone-faced" country ballad that leans into melancholy, and it leaves "more questions than answers". A "Mutt Lange-penned" closer "Who Are You", can be regarded as either a pop-country love song or a faith-oriented anthem.

== Promotion ==
=== Marketing and packaging ===
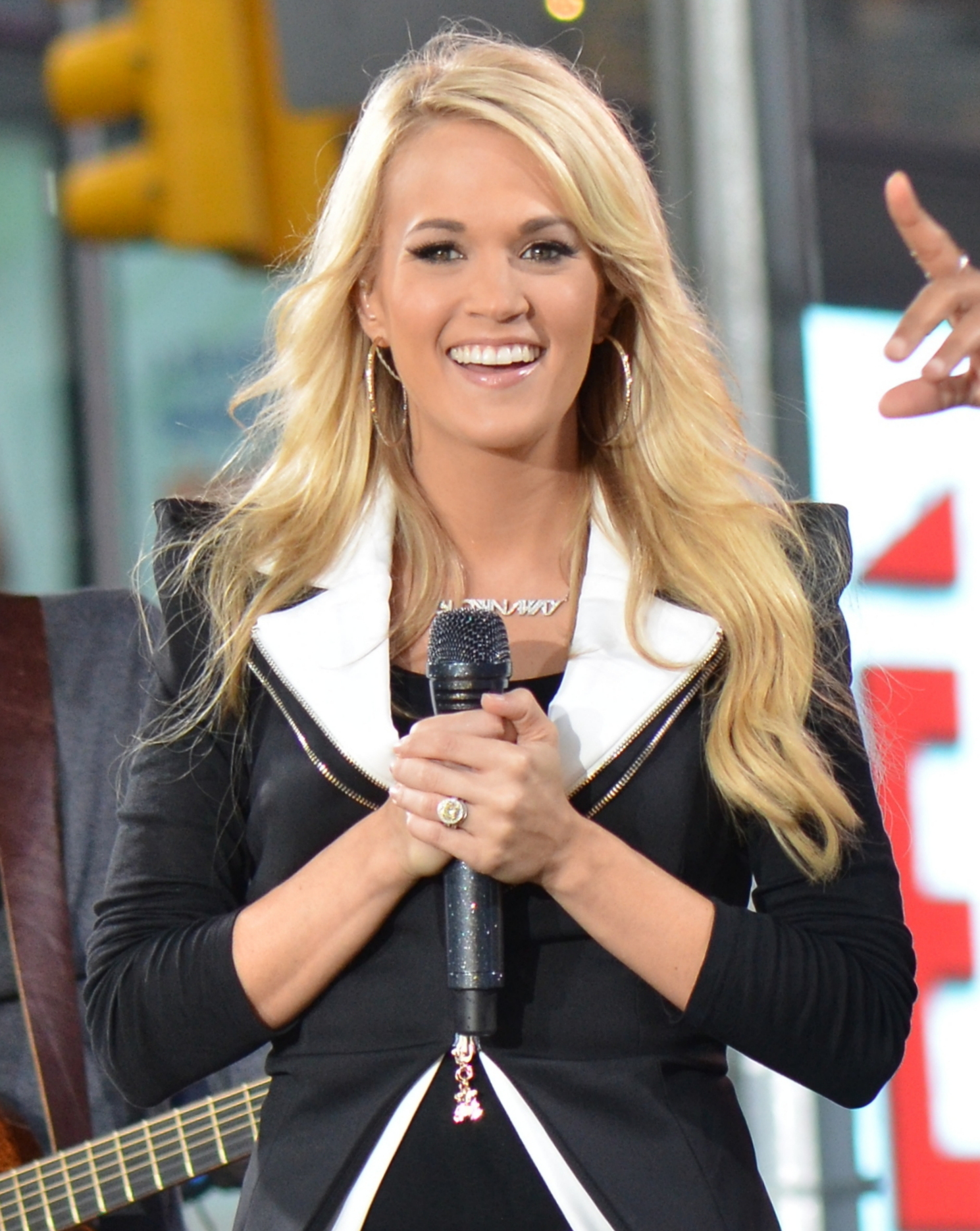
Underwood performing at Times Square on May 1, 2012

With the release of her highly anticipated fourth album, Underwood made numerous television, radio, and online appearances. On April 29, 2012, Underwood was featured on Nightline, and a day after, Good Morning America aired an exclusive interview. Later that evening, Underwood performed "Good Girl" on Late Show with David Letterman as well as holding a concert on the Live on Letterman webcast concert series streaming live online. On May 1, Underwood returned to Good Morning America to perform a special live outdoor concert in Times Square, followed by an iHeartRadio Live performance streaming live online that evening. She appeared on American Idol on May 3 with a special performance of the title track from her album. Underwood also made appearances on The Ellen DeGeneres Show on May 9, Jimmy Kimmel Live! on May 10, and Dancing with the Stars on May 15, followed by the Billboard Music Awards on May 20. On May 26, she headlined at Bayou Country Superfest in Baton Rouge, Louisiana, performing several new songs from the album.

Consisting of fourteen tracks, Blown Away became available as CD, digital download, and streaming formats. The UK and Japanese edition feature four bonus tracks—"Cowboy Casanova", "Before He Cheats", "Last Name", and "Jesus, Take the Wheel"—released from her previous albums. (Note: "Cowboy Casanova" is included in Underwood's third album Play On; "Before He Cheats" and "Jesus, Take the Wheel" are in her debut album Some Hearts; "Last Name" is in her second album Carnival Ride.) The cover of Blown Away reflects Underwood's evolution from the "girl next door" image associated with her early career to a more stylized and dramatic persona. In the cover, she is shown gazing into the distance, dressed in a gray gown whose extended train billows behind her. Previously known for songs centered on faith, compassion, and moral clarity, Underwood is depicted in cover of "Blown Away" as an "airbrushed, supermodel heroine", posed in a glamorous gown compared to Angelina Jolie at the Academy Awards. The album's cover artwork was later recognized by The Boot, which ranked Blown Away first on its list of the singer's Top 10 single, EP and album covers.

=== Singles and sales ===
The first single from the album, "Good Girl" was first teased on January 25, 2012, with Underwood describing it as "blow you guys away". The song was leaked on February 21, two days before of its official release. It was released on February 23, and the music video for the track premiered on March 12. Commercially, "Good Girl" debuted at number thirty on the Billboard's Hot Country Songs chart and number twenty-four on Billboard Hot 100. The song eventually climbed to a peak of eighteen on the Hot 100, and it topped at the Hot Country Songs and Canada Country chart. Furthermore, the track has been certified 2× Platinum by the RIAA and Platinum by Music Canada. "Blown Away" was released on July 9, as the second single from the album. The song peaked at number twenty on the Hot 100, and number two on Hot Country Songs. It also topped the Country Airplay chart and reached 155 in the UK Singles Chart. "Blown Away" was certified 5× Platinum by the RIAA and Platinum by the CRIA.

The third single of the album, "Two Black Cadillacs", was released on November 18, 2012. The music video for the song was released on January 23, 2013. The song peaked at number two on the Country Airplay chart and number four on Hot Country Songs, also certified Platinum by the RIAA. On March 18, Underwood announced via Twitter that "See You Again" would be the fourth single off the album, and it impacted Country radio on April 15. The song reached number two on the Country Airplay chart and number seven on Hot Country Songs. On August 10, 2015, the song was certified Platinum by the RIAA.

=== Tour ===
To promote the album, Underwood embarked on the Blown Away Tour which contained an international run of shows during the summer of 2012, including her first-ever United Kingdom concert. It took place at the prestigious Royal Albert Hall in London on June 21. The tour was announced on May 1, 2012, and it began on September 14 in Manchester, New Hampshire. The Royal Albert Hall concert sold out within the first 90 minutes of public ticket sales. The opening act for Underwood on the North American leg of the tour was country singer Hunter Hayes. Underwood donated a dollar from each ticket sold on the North American leg, to support the Red Cross disaster relief. A second North American leg of the tour was announced for the spring of 2013. The tour ultimately ran through May 2013 and played to over one million fans over the course of 112 shows.

A concert DVD, The Blown Away Tour: Live, was released on August 13, 2013. The footage was captured during Underwood's concert in Ontario, California on March 3. The DVD includes more than twenty songs performed by Underwood on the tour, as well as exclusive interviews with Underwood and Raj Kapoor, a tour director of the Blown Away Tour, and other behind-the-scenes footage about the tour. The DVD has since been certified Gold by the RIAA.

== Critical reception ==
Professional ratings
Aggregate scores
Source	Rating
Metacritic	70/100
Review scores
Source	Rating
AllMusic	4/5 stars
American Songwriter	4/5 stars
Billboard	4.5/5 stars
Country Weekly	4/5 stars
Entertainment Weekly	B+
The Guardian	3/5 stars
Los Angeles Times	2/4 stars
Rolling Stone	2.5/5 stars
Slant Magazine	3/5 stars
USA Today	3/4 stars

Blown Away received mostly positive reviews from music critics. On Metacritic, which assigns a normalized rating out of 100 to reviews from mainstream critics, the album received an average score of 70 based on 12 reviews, indicating "generally favorable reviews".

Some reviewers praised Blown Away as a confident album that highlights Underwood's vocal power and comfort as a superstar. Stephen Thomas Erlewine of AllMusic wrote that its turn-of-the-millennium nostalgia is handled with "skill and savvy", which delivers larger-than-life power ballads and arena-ready country firmly within Underwood's "wheelhouse". He added that Blown Away presents her as fully at ease with her role as a superstar, and suggested that she has rarely seemed as comfortable with that identity as she does here. Deborah Evans Price of Billboard praised the album, writing that Underwood delivers her "most adventurous" work to date while addressing a range of emotional subjects such as abuse, infidelity, revenge, and regret. Jessica Nicholson of Country Weekly wrote that it is "easily" Underwood's most well-rounded and confident work to date. The New York Times editor Jon Caramanica offered a positive assessment of the album, noting that Underwood's "huge" voice is particularly effective when channeling anger, a quality that has long defined her strongest material. Caramanica also emphasized her established position within country music, describing her blend of vocal ambition and toughness as reminiscent of a younger Martina McBride.

Other critics highlighted the album's artistic growth and cohesion while encouraging further creative expansion. Eric Allen of American Songwriter wrote that Blown Away shows "considerable artistic and creative growth" in Underwood's songwriting and choice of material. He added that the record feels more "thematic and unified", calling it her strongest effort to date. Melissa Maerz of Entertainment Weekly referred to Blown Away as Underwood's "most stadium-rock-friendly album yet. At USA Today, Elysa Garnder told that the release "both reaffirms her natural gifts and makes us continue to root for her to push beyond them."

More mixed reviews criticized the album as formulaic despite acknowledging Underwood's vocal strength. Mikael Wood of the Los Angeles Times expressed that much of it finds Underwood using her "remarkable voice" to deliver "feel-good bromides" and cited the lightly reggae-inflected "One Way Ticket" as an example. While Johnathan Keefe of Slant Magazine was similarly restrained in his assessment, though he credited Underwood for "at least tak[ing] far more creative risks than she ever has before" and for occasionally straying from a formula he felt had become "stale and predictable". Sean Daly of Tampa Bay Times believed that it is dominated by "cliché pleadings for lost love" and arguing that Blown Away sounds more "Hollywood safe" than "Nashville tough". Jody Rosen of Rolling Stone wrote that Underwood's voice remains "as powerful as ever", but felt that Blown Away tries too hard by amplifying its melodrama through heavy use of strings and effects. At The Guardian, Caroline Sullivan felt that the album "may be too formulaic to give her much of a foothold."

=== Awards and nominations ===
Award	Category	Result	Ref.
2012 American Music Awards	Favorite Country Album	Won	
2013 Country Music Awards of Australia	Top Selling International Album of the Year	Won	
2013 World Music Awards	World's Best Album	Nominated	
2013 Academy of Country Music Awards	Album of the Year	Nominated	
2013 People's Choice Awards	Favorite Album	Nominated	
2013 Billboard Music Awards	Top Country Album	Nominated	
2013 Country Music Association Awards	Album of the Year	Nominated	

== Commercial performance ==
Blown Away debuted at number one in the United States on the Billboard 200 chart with first-week sales of 267,000 copies. It marks Underwood's third number-one album on the chart, following Carnival Ride and Play On. Furthermore, she became the third female to chart at number one on the Billboard 200 with three country albums, tying her with Linda Ronstadt and Faith Hill. Like her three previous albums, Blown Away also debuted at the top of the Top Country Albums chart; Underwood became the only second female to achieve it. In its second week, the album stayed at number one and became Underwood's first album to spend more than a week at the top, selling 120,000 copies. Blown Away had topped the Top Country Albums chart for seven weeks.

The record was the seventh best selling album of 2012 in the US, marking the second time Underwood had an album inside the top 10 albums since her debut Some Hearts which was landed at number three in 2006. Blown Away sold over 1,400,000 copies worldwide in 2012, according to the International Federation of the Phonographic Industry. As of October 2019, it has sold 1,853,200 copies in the US. The album has sold over two million copies worldwide, being Underwood's fourth consecutive album to sell at least two million copies. In January 2020, the album received a 3× Platinum certification from the RIAA for 3 million units in sales and streams.

In Canada, the album debuted at number one, with first-week sales of 17,300 copies. It also debuted at number four on the ARIA Top 50 Albums, and at number one on the ARIA Top 20 Country Albums charts in Australia. Her first-ever officially released album in the United Kingdom, Blown Away debuted at number eleven on the UK Top 100 Albums, and at number one on the UK Top Country Albums. It has since sold 61,000 copies in the United Kingdom, and has been certified Gold by the BPI.

== Track listing ==
Standard edition
No.	Title	Writer(s)	Length
1.	"Good Girl"	Carrie Underwood; Chris DeStefano; Ashley Gorley	3:25
2.	"Blown Away"	Chris Tompkins; Josh Kear	4:00
3.	"Two Black Cadillacs"	Underwood; Hillary Lindsey; Kear	4:58
4.	"See You Again"	Underwood; David Hodges; Lindsey	4:06
5.	"Do You Think About Me"	Cary Barlowe; Lindsey; Shane Stevens	3:37
6.	"Forever Changed"	Tom Douglas; James T. Slater; Lindsey	4:02
7.	"Nobody Ever Told You"	Underwood; Lindsey; Luke Laird	4:10
8.	"One Way Ticket"	Underwood; Laird; Kear	3:56
9.	"Thank God for Hometowns"	Laird; Gorley; Lindsey	4:01
10.	"Good in Goodbye"	Underwood; Ryan Tedder; Lindsey	4:17
11.	"Leave Love Alone"	Gordie Sampson; Troy Verges; Lindsey	3:19
12.	"Cupid's Got a Shotgun"	Underwood; Tompkins; Kear	3:43
13.	"Wine After Whiskey"	Underwood; Tom Shapiro; Dave Berg	3:51
14.	"Who Are You"	Robert John "Mutt" Lange	3:55
Total length:			55:20

U.K. and Japanese edition
No.	Title	Writer(s)	Length
15.	"Cowboy Casanova"	Underwood; Mike Elizondo; Brett James	3:56
16.	"Before He Cheats"	Tompkins; Kear	3:19
17.	"Last Name"	Underwood; Laird; Lindsey	4:01
18.	"Jesus, Take the Wheel"	James; Lindsey; Sampson	3:46

== Personnel ==
Credits were adapted from AllMusic.

Vocals

- Lead vocals – Carrie Underwood
- Backing vocals – Cary Barlowe, Perry Coleman, Wes Hightower, David Hodges, Hillary Lindsey, Gordie Sampson, Jenifer Wrinkle, Carrie Underwood

Musicians

- Charlie Judge – acoustic piano, Hammond B3 organ, keyboards, programming
- Jimmy Nichols – keyboards, acoustic piano, Wurlitzer electric piano
- Tom Bukovac – electric guitar, acoustic guitar
- Brad Paisley – electric guitar
- Ilya Toshinsky – acoustic guitar, bouzouki, mandolin, ukulele
- Dan Dugmore – steel guitar
- Aubrey Haynie – mandolin, fiddle
- Mike Johnson – dobro, steel guitar
- Jimmie Lee Sloas – bass guitar
- Paul Leim – drums
- Chris McHugh – drums
- Eric Darken – percussion
- Jonathan Yudkin – cello, fiddle

Technical and production

- Chris Ashburn – recording assistant, mix assistant
- Adam Ayan – mastering at Gateway Mastering (Portland, Maine).
- Derek Bason – recording engineer, mixing
- Mark Bright – producer
- Charles Butler – digital editing
- Neal Cappellino – additional recording
- Ann Edelblute – manager
- Mike "Frog" Griffith – production coordination
- Simon Fuller – manager
- David Hodges – additional recording
- Christopher Small – digital editing
- Todd Tidwell – additional recording
- Kirsten Wines – production assistant

Visuals and imagery

- Enzo Angileri – hair stylist
- Randee St. Nicholas – photography
- Francesca Tolot – make-up
- Emma Trask – stylist

== Charts ==
=== Weekly charts ===
Chart (2012)	Peak position
Australian ARIA Albums (ARIA)	4
Canadian Albums (Billboard)	1
Canadian Country Albums (Billboard)	1
Irish Albums Chart (IRMA)	26
Japanese Albums Chart (Oricon)	101
New Zealand Albums (RIANZ)	22
Scottish Albums (OCC)	8
UK Albums (OCC)	11
UK Country Artist Albums (OCC)	1
US Billboard 200	1
US Top Country Albums (Billboard)	1

=== Year-end charts ===
Chart (2012)	Position
Australian ARIA Top 50 Country Albums (ARIA)	7
Canadian Albums Chart (Billboard)	29
US Billboard 200	14
US Country Albums Chart (Billboard)	5
US Digital Albums Chart (Billboard)	23
Chart (2013)	Position
US Billboard 200	31
US Top Country Albums (Billboard)	9
Chart (2014)	Position
US Top Catalog Albums (Billboard)	40

=== Decade-end charts ===
Chart (2010–2019)	Position
US Billboard 200	73
US Top Country Albums (Billboard)	24

== Certifications ==
Region	Certification	Certified units/sales
Australia (ARIA)	Gold	35,000^{^}
Canada (Music Canada)	Platinum	80,000^{^}
United Kingdom (BPI)	Gold	100,000^{‡}
United States (RIAA)	3× Platinum	1,853,200
^{^} Shipments figures based on certification alone.^{‡} Sales+streaming figures based on certification alone.

== Release history ==
Date	Format(s)	Edition	Label(s)	Ref.
May 1, 2012	CD; digital download; streaming	Standard	19; Arista Nashville	
June 26, 2012	CD; digital download; streaming	UK	19; Arista Nashville	
July 31, 2012	CD; digital download; streaming	Japanese	PSP	
