= Moments That Matter =

Studio album by Aaron Lines
- Released: June 12, 2007
- Genre: Country
- Length: 34:24
- Label: Outside the Lines Inc.
- Producer: Aaron Lines

Aaron Lines chronology
Waitin' on the Wonderful (2005)	Moments That Matter (2007)	Sunday Afternoon (2010)

Moments That Matter is the third studio album by Canadian country music singer Aaron Lines, released on June 12, 2007. It features the single "Cheaper to Keep Her". The song "Let's Get Drunk and Fight" was covered by Joe Nichols on his 2007 album Real Things.

== Track listing ==
1. "Cheaper to Keep Her" (Aaron Lines, Chris Lindsey, Jessica Maros) – 3:26
2. "Moments That Matter" (Lines, Mark Irwin, Josh Kear) – 3:44
3. "Somebody's Son" (Lines) – 3:51
4. "Let's Get Drunk and Fight" (Lines, Lindsey, Aimee Mayo, Troy Verges) – 3:58
5. "When We Make Love" (Lines) – 3:40
6. "It Broke Off" (Lines) – 2:51
7. "Everyday Heroes" (Lines, Kear) – 3:44
8. "Just Drunk Enough" (Lines, Monty Powell) – 3:36
9. "Sometimes It's Summertime" (Lines, Irwin, Kear) – 2:45
10. "Nothing Like You" (Lines, Lindsey, Mayo, Verges) – 2:49
