= Aaron Lines =

Canadian country musician (born 1977)

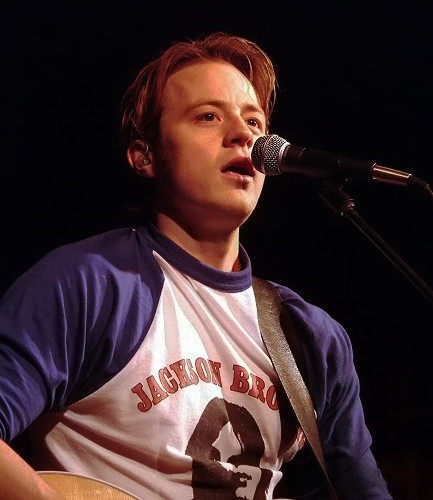
- Aaron Lines in concert at the Maverick Saloon, Santa Ynez, California in 2006

Background information
- Born: Anthony Aaron Lines; November 17, 1977 (age 48)
- Origin: Fort McMurray, Alberta, Canada
- Genres: Country
- Occupation: Singer-songwriter
- Instruments: Vocals, guitar, piano
- Years active: 2001–2011
- Labels: Combustion, RCA Nashville, BNA, Sony BMG Canada, Outside the Lines, On Ramp

Anthony Aaron Lines (born November 17, 1977) is a Canadian country music singer. He has recorded for RCA Nashville, BNA and On Ramp Records, and has charted three singles on the Hot Country Songs charts in the United States, in addition to landing one number one hit on the Canada Country chart.

== Musical history ==
=== Love Changes Everything ===
Aaron Lines' debut album, Love Changes Everything, was released in Canada in 2001 by independent record label Combustion Music. The first two singles, "Love Changes Everything" and "I Can Read Your Heart," both found success on Canadian country radio. Lines was nominated for Best New Country Artist/Group at the 2002 Juno Awards, and Best New Artist at the 2002 Canadian Country Music Association (CCMA) Awards.

=== Living Out Loud ===
As Lines' career was taking off in Canada, he set his sights on an American record deal. He performed a showcase for RCA Nashville in May 2001. The next day, the label phoned to offer Lines a record deal. He immediately began work on his debut album, Living Out Loud, released on January 7, 2003. The album debuted at No. 9 on Billboard's Top Country Albums chart, while the first single, "You Can't Hide Beautiful," reached No. 4 on Billboard's Hot Country Songs chart. The album was a success in Canada as well, and at the 2003 CCMA Awards, Lines received six nominations, including the Kraft Cheez Whiz Fans' Choice Award. When the awards were handed out in September, Lines was named Male Artist of the Year, and also picked up the Rising Star Award.

In 2003, Lines was an opening act for Martina McBride's Greatest Hits tour.

=== Waitin' on the Wonderful ===
Aaron Lines' second album, Waitin' on the Wonderful, was released on September 6, 2005. The title track stalled at No. 36 on US Country and the album was not released in the US. Meanwhile, in Canada, the first three singles from the album all reached the top 10 on the Canadian Country Singles chart. In fact, Lines was the most played country artist on Canadian radio in 2005. For two years, Lines had the most played song on Canadian country radio – "Waitin' on the Wonderful" in 2005, and "Lights of My Hometown" in 2006. At the 2006 CCMA Awards, Lines was again nominated for the Kraft Cheez Whiz Fans' Choice Award.

=== Moments That Matter ===
Lines moved back from Nashville to Canada in 2006 to work on his third album, Moments That Matter. The album was released on June 12, 2007, and distributed by Fontana Distribution. The first single, "Cheaper to Keep Her," became Lines' first No. 1, reaching the top spot in 11 short weeks. The accompanying music video features cameos from Rhett Warrener, Darren McCarty, Jamie McLennan, Richie Regehr, and Lines' good friend Paul Brandt. Moments That Matter was nominated for the 2008 Juno Award for Country Recording of the Year.

=== Sunday Afternoon ===
Aaron Lines' fourth studio album, Sunday Afternoon, was released on March 16, 2010, by On Ramp Records. The first single, "Sand" was released in April 2009. The second single "I Haven't Even Heard You Cry" was released on January 6, 2010.

== Discography ==
=== Studio albums ===
Title	Details	Peak chart positions	
Title	Details	US Country	US
Living Out Loud	Release date: January 7, 2003; Label: RCA Nashville	9	68
Waitin' on the Wonderful	Release date: September 6, 2005; Label: Sony BMG Canada	—	—
Moments That Matter	Release date: June 12, 2007; Label: Outside the Lines	—	—
Sunday Afternoon	Release date: March 16, 2010; Label: On Ramp Records	—	—
"—" denotes releases that did not chart

=== Singles ===
Year	Single	Peak positions				Album
Year	Single	CAN Country	CAN	US Country	US	Album
2001	"Love Changes Everything"	*	—	—	—	Love Changes Everything
2001	"I Can Read Your Heart"	*	—	—	—	Love Changes Everything
2002	"You Can't Hide Beautiful"	*	—	4	38	Living Out Loud
2003	"Living Out Loud"	*	—	—	—	Living Out Loud
2003	"Love Changes Everything" (US release)	*	—	39	—	Living Out Loud
2003	"Close"	*	—	—	—	Living Out Loud
2004	"Turn It Up (I Like the Sound of That)"	7	—	—	—	Living Out Loud
2005	"Waitin' on the Wonderful"	5	—	36	—	Waitin' on the Wonderful
2005	"It Takes a Man"	6	—	—	—	Waitin' on the Wonderful
2005	"Lights of My Hometown"	4	—	—	—	Waitin' on the Wonderful
2006	"Twenty Years Late"	13	—	—	—	Waitin' on the Wonderful
2006	"Seeing Things"	12	—	—	—	Waitin' on the Wonderful
2007	"Cheaper to Keep Her"	1	68	—	—	Moments That Matter
2007	"Somebody's Son"	12	98	—	—	Moments That Matter
2008	"Moments That Matter"	8	92	—	—	Moments That Matter
2008	"Let's Get Drunk and Fight"	28	—	—	—	Moments That Matter
2008	"When We Make Love"	—	—	—	—	Moments That Matter
2009	"Sand"	24	—	—	—	Sunday Afternoon
2010	"I Haven't Even Heard You Cry"	13	—	—	—	Sunday Afternoon
2010	"The Trouble with California"	25	—	—	—	Sunday Afternoon
2010	"These Are Those Days"	16	—	—	—	Sunday Afternoon
2011	"Unloving You"	—	—	—	—	Sunday Afternoon
2011	"Sunday Afternoon"	41	—	—	—	Sunday Afternoon
"—" denotes releases that did not chart "*" denotes releases where no chart existed

=== Music videos ===
Year	Video	Director
2001	"I Can Read Your Heart"	Lisa Mann
2002	"You Can't Hide Beautiful"	Thom Oliphant
2003	"Living Out Loud"	Shawn Maher
2005	"Waitin' on the Wonderful"	Kristin Barlowe
2005	"Lights of My Hometown"	Warren P. Sonoda
2007	"Cheaper to Keep Her"	Warren P. Sonoda
2007	"Somebody's Son"	
2010	"I Haven't Even Heard You Cry"	Antonio Hrynchuk
2010	"These Are Those Days"	Steve J Murphy

== Awards and nominations ==
Year	Association	Category	Result
2001	Canadian Country Music Association	Chevy Trucks Rising Star Award	Nominated
2002	Juno Awards of 2002	Best New Country Artist/Group	Nominated
2002	Canadian Country Music Association	Chevy Trucks Rising Star Award	Nominated
2002	Canadian Country Music Association	Independent Male Artist of the Year	Nominated
2002	Canadian Country Music Association	Independent Song of the Year – "Love Changes Everything"	Nominated
2003	Canadian Country Music Association	Kraft Cheez Whiz Fans' Choice Award	Nominated
2003	Canadian Country Music Association	Male Artist of the Year	Won
2003	Canadian Country Music Association	Chevy Trucks Rising Star Award	Won
2003	Canadian Country Music Association	Album of the Year – Living Out Loud	Nominated
2003	Canadian Country Music Association	Single of the Year – "You Can't Hide Beautiful"	Nominated
2003	Canadian Country Music Association	CMT Video of the Year – "You Can't Hide Beautiful"	Nominated
2004	Juno Awards of 2004	Country Recording of the Year – Living Out Loud	Nominated
2004	Canadian Country Music Association	Male Artist of the Year	Nominated
2006	Juno Awards of 2006	Country Recording of the Year – Waitin' on the Wonderful	Nominated
2006	Canadian Country Music Association	Kraft Cheez Whiz Fans' Choice Award	Nominated
2008	Juno Awards of 2008	Country Recording of the Year – Moments That Matter	Nominated
2011	Canadian Country Music Association	Album of the Year – Sunday Afternoon	Nominated
