= Toyota Arena =

Multi-purpose arena in Ontario, California, U.S.

Coordinates: 34.072947°N 117.566401°W

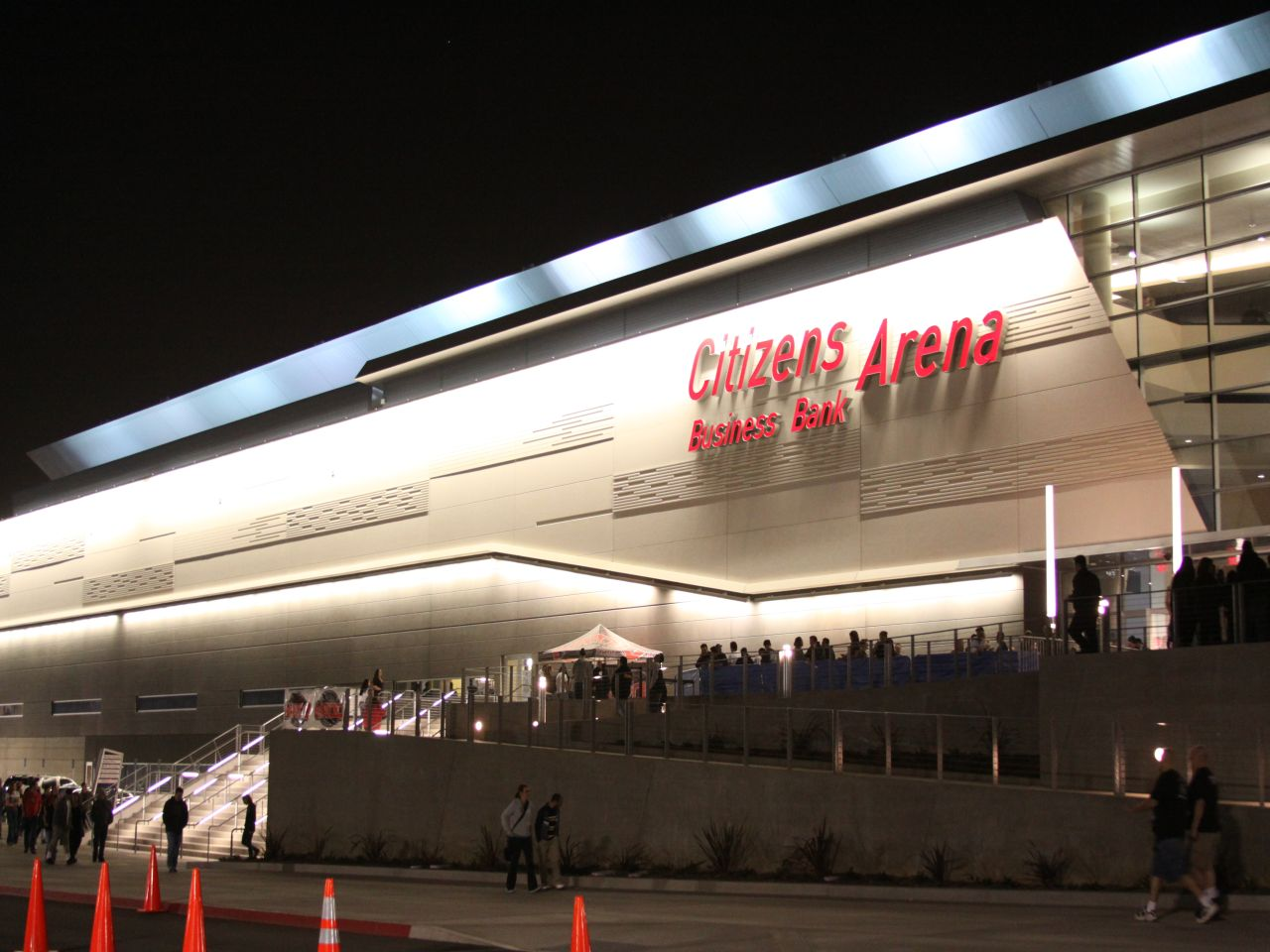

- Location within California Location within the United States
- Former names: Ontario Community Events Center (2006); Citizens Business Bank Arena (or Citizens Arena) (2006–2019)
- Address: 4000 East Ontario Center Parkway
- Location: Ontario, California, U.S.
- Owner: City of Ontario
- Operator: ASM Global
- Capacity: Basketball: 10,832; Hockey: 9,736; Indoor soccer: 9,736; Concerts: 11,089
- Public transit: Rancho Cucamonga

Construction
- Groundbreaking: March 7, 2007
- Opened: October 18, 2008
- Cost: US$150 million ($224 million in 2025 dollars)
- Architect: Rossetti Architects
- Project manager: ICON Venue Group
- Structural engineers: Englekirk Partners Consulting Engineers, Inc.
- Services engineers: M-E Engineers, Inc.
- General contractor: Turner Construction

Tenants
- Ontario Reign (ECHL) (2008–2015); Los Angeles D-Fenders (NBA D-League) (2008–2009); Los Angeles Temptation (LFL) (2011–2014; 2016–2019); Ontario Warriors (AIF) (2012); Empire Strykers (MASL) (2013–present); Las Vegas Sin (LFL) (2015); Ontario Reign (AHL) (2015–present); Ontario Clippers (NBAGL) (2017–2024)

Website
- toyota-arena.com

Toyota Arena is a multi-purpose arena in Ontario, California, United States. The arena hosts local sporting events and concerts and is suitable for indoor events, including basketball, ice hockey, ice shows, boxing, graduation ceremonies and concerts. The arena's basketball capacity is 10,832; 9,736 for hockey; and has a full capacity configuration for 11,089 spectators. The 225,000-square-foot (20,900 m^{2}) venue also has 36 luxury suites on two levels. Construction officially began on March 7, 2007, and the arena was opened on October 18, 2008. It is the largest and most modern arena within the Inland Empire region of Southern California.

The arena's construction cost was US$150 million; however, it was debt free due to the city of Ontario selling different properties throughout the city. It was constructed on the old Ontario Motor Speedway property. The arena is public property and owned by the city of Ontario. From 2008 to 2016 the facility was operated by AEG Worldwide, and has since been operated by successor ASM Global, which took over operations on July 1, 2016. The arena is home to the Ontario Reign of the American Hockey League and the Empire Strykers of the Major Arena Soccer League.

== Description ==
=== Name ===
The arena was announced as Ontario Community Events Center in October 2006 when the project was approved. On October 20, 2006, Ontario-based Citizens Business Bank bought the naming rights and the arena was called Citizens Business Bank Arena (or Citizens Arena) when it opened in 2008.

On June 11, 2019, the arena entered a new naming-rights agreement with the Southern California Toyota Dealership Association and was renamed Toyota Arena.

=== Tenants ===
In November 2007, it was announced that a new ECHL franchise would be playing at the arena starting in the 2008–09 season. The arena became home of the Ontario Reign, an affiliate of the Los Angeles Kings. The ECHL Reign played their home games at the arena each season from 2008 to 2015.

In 2012, the arena was home to the Ontario Warriors of American Indoor Football but the team folded before the season ended.

Since 2013, the arena has been home of the Empire Strykers of the Major Arena Soccer League.

In 2008–09, the arena also hosted most home games of the Los Angeles D-Fenders.

On January 29, 2015, the Los Angeles Kings announced that they would be moving their American Hockey League affiliate, the Manchester Monarchs, from Manchester, New Hampshire, to Ontario. The team retained the Ontario Reign nickname from its ECHL predecessor. The ECHL's Reign moved to Manchester, New Hampshire, and became the Monarchs.

Starting in the 2017–18 season the arena became home of the Agua Caliente Clippers (later renamed Ontario Clippers), the NBA G League team of the Los Angeles Clippers. On March 11, 2024, the team announced the club would be relocating to Oceanside, California, and rebranding as the San Diego Clippers.

== Events ==
The arena held its grand opening on October 18, 2008.

=== Basketball ===
On October 24, 2008, its first event took place in front of a sold-out crowd of 10,316, for an NBA preseason game, where the Los Angeles Lakers defeated the Oklahoma City Thunder 105–94. There has been a Lakers' preseason game every year at the arena with the exception of 2011 due to the 2011 NBA lockout.

The arena was host of the inaugural games in the Junior Basketball Association on June 21, 2018, and is the host of the 2018 JBA Championship.

=== Hockey ===
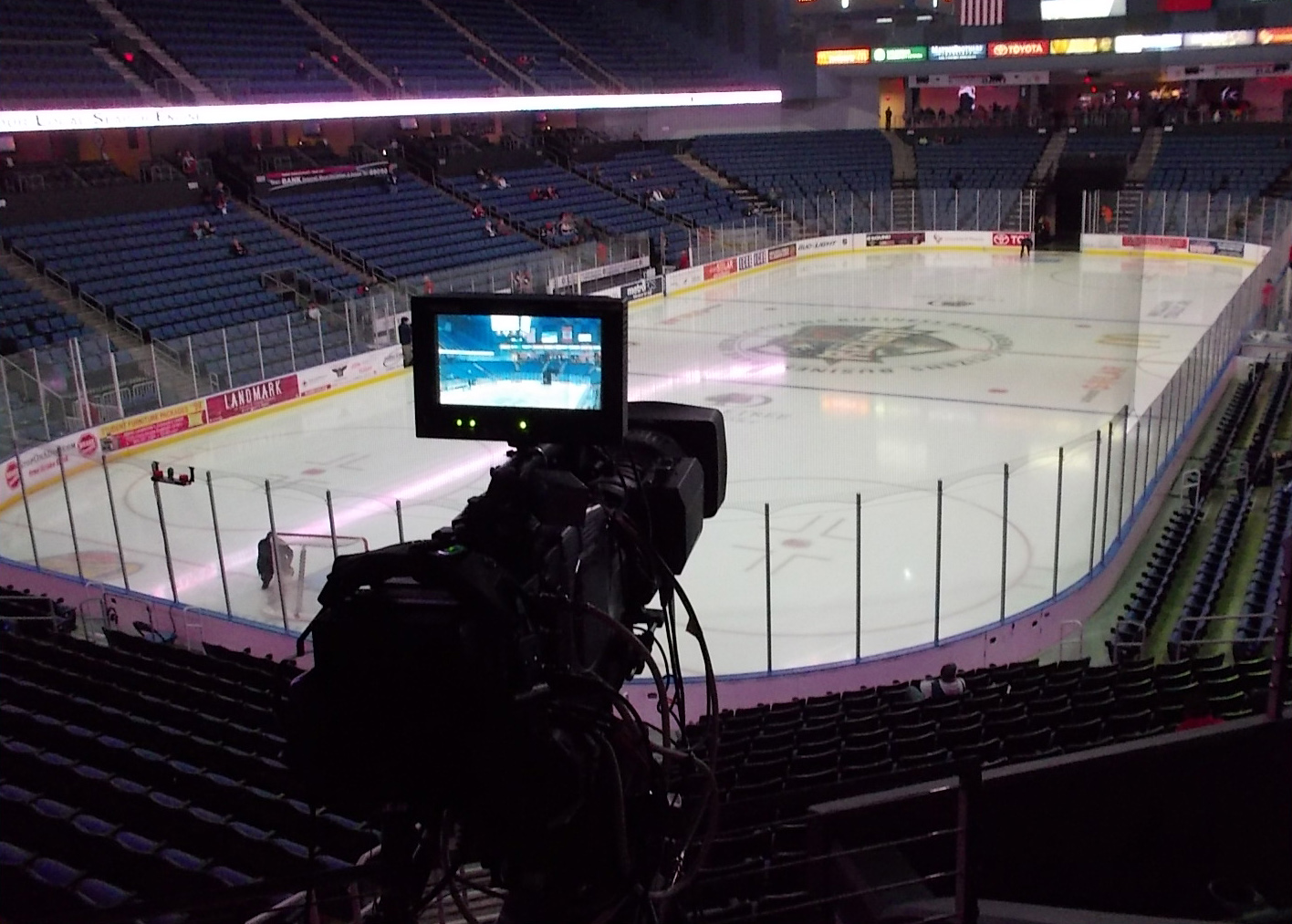
Toyota Arena in an ice hockey configuration

The Reign held its first game at the arena on October 25, 2008, against the Las Vegas Wranglers in front of a crowd of 8,832. The Reign won their first game at the arena 4–1.

On January 20, 2010, the arena hosted the 2010 ECHL All-Star Game in front of 7,615 fans.

The arena also hosted a preseason match between the Los Angeles Kings and the San Jose Sharks.

The arena also held the AHL All-Star Classic in January 2020.

=== Entertainment ===
Carrie Underwood played the arena's first concert on November 9, 2008, with Little Big Town as her opening act.

American heavy metal band Metallica performed at the arena during their World Magnetic Tour on December 12, 2008, in front of a crowd of 10,959 and filmed part of their music video Broken, Beat & Scarred during the concert and also at the concert at the Save Mart Center in Fresno, California, on December 13, 2008.

The arena has also hosted Bill Gaither, Larry the Cable Guy, Vicente Fernández, Sade, Justin Bieber, Earth, Wind & Fire, Chicago, Elton John, The Eagles, Disney on Ice, Playhouse Disney Live, Sesame Street Live, The Harlem Globetrotters, Bob Dylan, Scorpions, Neil Diamond, André Rieu, American Idol Live!, Trace Adkins, Alan Jackson, Pitbull, Dancing With the Stars, Stars on Ice, Ringling Bros. and Barnum & Bailey Circus, Trans-Siberian Orchestra, and other events. On September 1, 2013, the arena was the site where Mexican singers Joan Sebastian and Ezequiel Peña sang together for the first time ever.

The American Idols LIVE! Tour 2011 was held on July 16, 2011.

English singer Sade recorded her Bring Me Home Live 2011 DVD at the arena on September 4, 2011.

On October 29, 2012, Katy Perry did a private concert at the arena for the San Manuel Indian Tribe.

During her Blown Away Tour, country music singer Carrie Underwood filmed The Blown Away Tour: Live DVD at the arena on March 3, 2013, the concert also aired live on AXS TV.

During the summer of 2013, Selena Gomez used the arena to rehearse for her Stars Dance Tour.

On July 5, 2014, Cher did a stop here on her Dressed to Kill Tour with her special guest Cyndi Lauper.

=== Boxing, Wrestling, and MMA ===
The arena has hosted many boxing events. The first boxing event was on November 28, 2008, with two fights, Chris Arreola vs. Travis Walker and Paul Williams vs. Verno Phillips. On December 5, 2009, the arena hosted a women's title fight between champion Kina Malpartida and Lyndsey Scragg. On April 24, 2010, the arena was the venue where Tomasz Adamek defeated Chris Arreola to retain the IBF International Heavyweight Title. The arena also hosted ESPN Friday Night Fights on July 2, 2010, headlined by Demetrius Hopkins vs. Mike Arnaoutis. On August 13, 2010, Friday Night Fights returned to the arena with a fight between Chris Arreola and Manuel Quezada. On July 14, 2012, Mexican female boxer Mariana "La Barbie" Juarez defended her flyweight title against Japanese boxer Shindo Go; the bout was broadcast on Mexican channel Televisa Canal 5 series Sábados de Corona. On November 24, 2012, Robert Guerrero successfully defended his interim WBC Welterweight title against Andre Berto at the arena. The arena hosted Andre Ward vs Edwin Rodríguez on November 16, 2013. On March 13, 2015, the first PBC on Spike event was held at the venue with main event being Andre Berto vs Josesito López.

Since 2010, the arena has been the Inland Empire's stop for WWE, replacing the smaller Coussoulis Arena in San Bernardino. The arena has hosted various WWE Live events and various tapings for WWE Raw and SmackDown. The Smackdown/Main Event tapings on February 11, 2014, were the first time WWE televised an event from the Inland Empire since taping four editions of WWE Raw at the Orange Pavilion in San Bernardino on April 1, 1996.

The arena has also been host to many mixed martial arts events, including Bellator Fighting Championships. On August 10, 2013, the arena hosted WSOF 4: Spong vs. DeAnda. The arena also hosts various events of MMA promotion King of the Cage, which has its headquarters in nearby Rancho Cucamonga.

From 2014 to 2017, the arena hosted the annual CIF Southern Section Boys Masters Wrestling Championships. In 2018, the event was moved to Temecula Valley High School, where the event had been previously held, due to scheduling conflicts.

=== Other events ===
The venue hosted a PBR Built Ford Tough Series bull riding event in late September 2009 and also hosted another event on August 29 and August 30, 2010.

The arena was the site of the 2011 edition of Skate America from October 21 to the 23rd.

The arena is commonly used for high school graduation ceremonies throughout late May/early June. Most of the high schools originate from the Inland Empire and eastern edge of the San Gabriel Valley. These include the Corona-Norco Unified, Fontana Unified, Rialto Unified, Chino Valley Unified, and Upland Unified School Districts.

Additionally, the arena hosted the California FFA 95th Annual State Conference from March 16 through 19, 2023. This event was attended by 7,000 members and guests.

Hot Wheels Monster Trucks Live comes to the arena every September.

Events and tenants
| Preceded by Verizon Wireless Arena (as the Manchester Monarchs) | Home of the Ontario Reign (AHL); 2015 – future | Succeeded by current |
| Preceded by Ford Arena (as the Texas Wildcatters) | Home of the Ontario Reign (ECHL); 2008 – 2015 | Succeeded by Verizon Wireless Arena (as the Manchester Monarchs) |
| Preceded by Sovereign Center | Home of the ECHL All-Star Game; 2010 | Succeeded by Rabobank Arena |
| Preceded by Los Angeles Memorial Sports Arena | Home of the Los Angeles Temptation; 2011 – 2014 | Succeeded by Los Angeles Memorial Coliseum |
