= Blown Away (Carrie Underwood song) =

2012 single by Carrie Underwood

Single by Carrie Underwood

from the album Blown Away
- Released: July 9, 2012
- Recorded: 2011
- Length: 4:00
- Label: Arista Nashville
- Songwriters: Chris Tompkins; Josh Kear
- Producer: Mark Bright

Carrie Underwood singles chronology
"Good Girl" (2012)	"Blown Away" (2012)	"Two Black Cadillacs" (2012)

Music video
- "Blown Away" on YouTube

"Blown Away" is a song by American recording artist Carrie Underwood, taken from her fourth studio album of the same name (2012). The song served as the album's second single on July 9, 2012, through Arista Nashville. Written by Chris Tompkins and Josh Kear, who previously wrote Underwood's single "Before He Cheats" (2006), the song's lyrics are about a young woman who locks herself in a storm cellar while her abusive, alcoholic father is passed out on the couch in the path of a tornado. Producer Mark Bright drew inspiration from 1980s music.

Upon its release, "Blown Away" was met with positive reviews from music critics, who considered it to be the musical highlight of the album. The song's content and production received particular praise, as critics felt it confirmed the album's darker mood which Underwood had mentioned prior to its release. Commercially, "Blown Away" was successful; it became her 13th number one hit on the Billboard Country Airplay chart, and also reached number 20 on the Hot 100 in the United States. The track also charted in Canada and the United Kingdom. It won several awards, including two Grammy Awards, for Best Country Song and Best Country Solo Performance. The song has since been certified 5× platinum by the RIAA.

The accompanying music video was directed by Randee St. Nicholas. Underwood said that when she heard first the song, she already had ideas of a possible video for it, wanting it to be a dark Wizard of Oz set in 2012. It earned her an award for Video of the Year at the 2013 CMT Music Awards. The video was nominated for Music Video of the Year at the 2013 Country Music Association Awards. Underwood has performed "Blown Away" in a number of live appearances, including at the 2012 Billboard Music Awards, the 55th Annual Grammy Awards, and two years in a row at the Country Music Association Awards. It was also performed as the encore of the Blown Away Tour (2012–13).

== Background ==
On "Blown Away", American songwriters Chris Tompkins and Josh Kear, who previously wrote "Before He Cheats" for Underwood's debut album Some Hearts (2005), worked initially without a specific artist in mind. They first built the drums and the string parts that of the introduction and verses. Tompkins started to play his keyboard to find sound effects for the introduction and ended up using one that was a thunderstorm, stating. "I think that's what kind of threw us into it. We just started writing it". Kear commented that it was not the duo's intent or goal to make it a dark, revenge-themed song. As they wrote the pre-chorus line, "not enough rain in Oklahoma", both knew that it would be Underwood's song, as the singer is from that state. Kear commented, "We knew if we stuck with that lyric ["Oklahoma"—which is Carrie's home state] it was Carrie's song or maybe no one would ever record it". After the theme of the song had been established, the songwriters wanted to "dig up as much drama as [they] could".

== Composition ==
=== Music ===
"Blown Away" (2012)
A 21 second sample of the song's chorus features Underwood delivering a strong vocal performance over a melodic pop instrumentation. The vocal effect added to Underwood's voice was compared to the ones used in Def Leppard songs.

As noted by interviewer Kurt Wolff, "the melody and overall sound of the song also stand out as something fresh and very different". Songwriter Chris Tompkins explained to Wolff that "Blown Away" was an "attempt at 'melodic pop' that was 'unique' yet still 'country'". Tompkins further explained that "Blown Away" ultimately became inseparable from Underwood, describing it as "Carrie's song" that she had fully made her own, to the point that it could not have been pitched to any other artist. He noted that the track marked a stylistic shift for her, incorporating noticeable pop elements, and added that his own wide-ranging musical influences naturally filtered into the song's composition.

The final version of the song was produced by Mark Bright, who drew inspiration from 1980s music. Underwood recalled Bright adding an effect to her vocals similar to the ones used in Def Leppard songs: "That was a big thing with [the band], all of that hollow vocal sound. And I liked it." Bright used a similar effect on "See You Again", another song from Blown Away. "Blown Away" is written in the key of A minor, set in the common time with a tempo of 137 beats per minute. It follows the sequence of Am - C - G as its chord progression, with Underwood's voice spanning from the low note of G_{3} to the high note of E_{5}.

=== Lyrics ===
Lyrically, "Blown Away" tells the story of a daughter locking herself in a storm cellar while her alcoholic father is passed out on the couch in the path of a tornado. Underwood revealed that "Blown Away" was the song that defined the direction of the album, and recalled the first time she heard the demo:

"I listened to it on my crappy computer speakers and then I had to go find my headphones because as soon as I listened to a few bars, I had to listen more closely and I got chills. I remember where I was when I heard it and called my manager, Ann, and I was like, 'Do not let anyone else have this song! It’s my song.' In talking to Chris and Josh about it, they [told me], 'We said we're either writing a song for Carrie Underwood or this song is never going to see the light of day.' It made me feel so good that they were thinking of me when they wrote it."

== Reception ==
=== Critical response ===
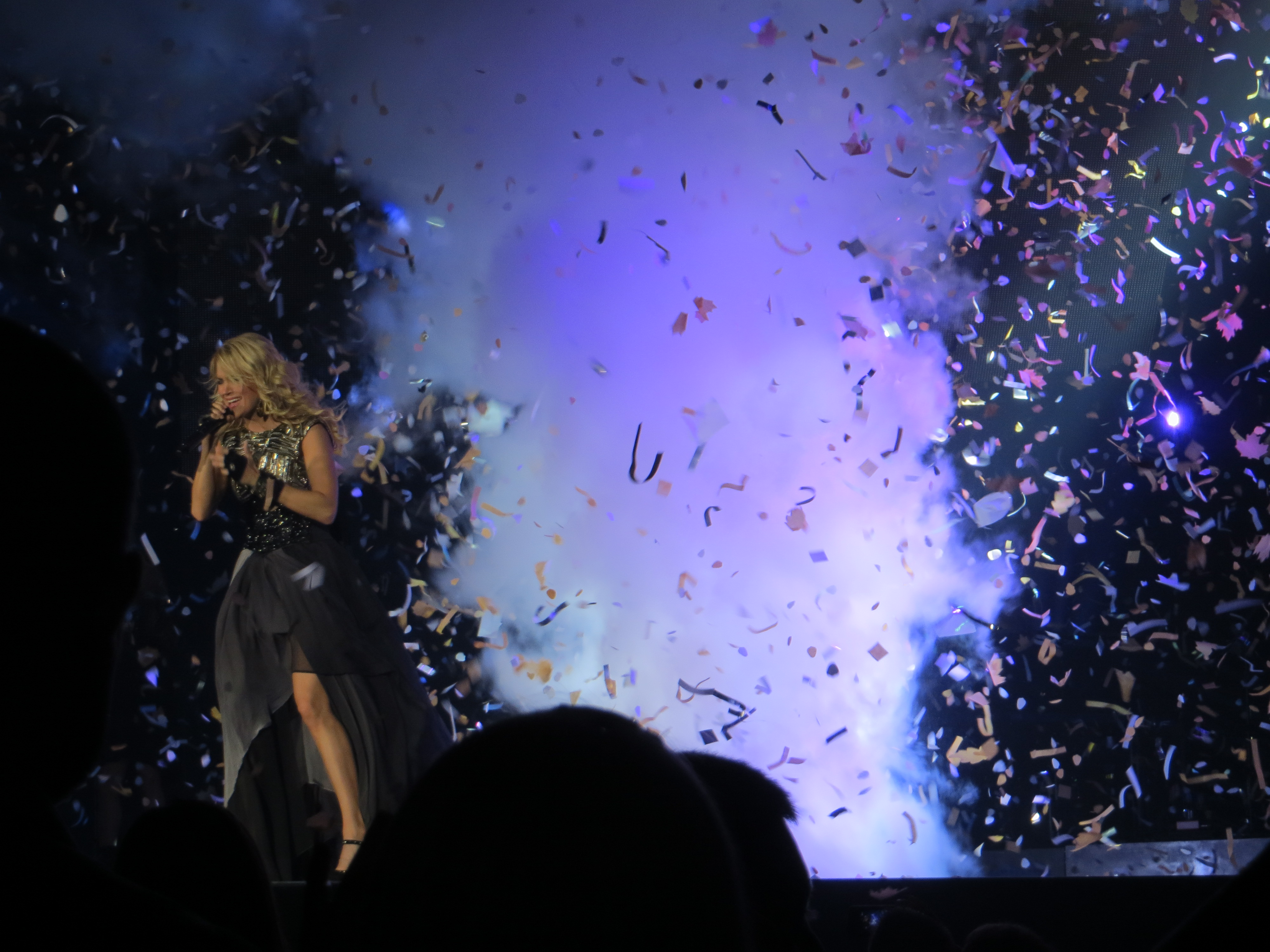
Underwood performing "Blown Away" on the Blown Away Tour (2012-13).

"Blown Away" received generally positive reviews from music critics. A reviewer for Billboard thought that Mark Bright's "brooding, atmospheric" production and Underwood's vocal performance "elevate this cinematic tune to an instant classic." They further commented, "When the girl shuts herself in the storm cellar, leaving her alcoholic father passed out on the couch in the path of a twister, you can almost feel the wind." Writing for the Los Angeles Times, Mikael Wood thought that the song confirmed the description of the album as "a turn toward darkness from a singer who first topped the country chart with 'Jesus, Take the Wheel'". USA Today columnist Brian Mansfield thought the song's "synthesizers, strings sounds, vocal overdubs and echoing guitars" combined dramatically, creating a "neo-80s feel - think an Oklahoma version of the Eurythmics."

"Blown Away" received a five-star rating from Billy Dukes of Taste of Country, who called it "dangerous, but irresistible." He also praised Underwood for recording darker material than her previous singles. Also giving it five stars, Bobby Peacock of Roughstock called it "more grandiose" than Underwood's previous efforts, also saying that it "makes itself known by sounding like absolutely nothing else on radio." Chris Richards of The Washington Post gave the song a mixed review, deeming the lyrics as "gripping", but negatively comparing the instrumentation to the work of Taylor Swift.

=== Chart performance ===
Following the release of the album, "Blown Away" debuted at number 22 on Billboard's Hot Digital Songs chart, with 66,000 units sold. It eventually peaked at number 15, staying at the chart for a total of 35 weeks. On the Hot 100 chart, "Blown Away" peaked at number 20 and spent 22 weeks on the chart; it was ranked the 70th biggest song of 2012 there overall. On the week of September 6, 2012, the song became Underwood's 16th top ten single on the Country Airplay component chart, a record among women in the tally's 68-year history according to Billboard. The following month, on the week of October 15, it reached the top spot, becoming the singer's 13th number one. It stayed there for a second week, making Underwood the only female vocalist of 2012 to achieve three weeks at number one on the chart, as previous single "Good Girl" had peaked at the same position. As of January 2020, the song has been certified 5× platinum by the RIAA, with the titular album being certified 3× platinum. As of February 2016, "Blown Away" has sold 2,819,000 digital units in the United States.

"Blown Away" also peaked at number one on the Canada Country chart, number 27 on the Canadian Hot 100, and is Underwood's second song to chart in the United Kingdom, reaching number 155, despite not having a proper release in the country.

=== Accolades ===
Year	Awards	Category	Result	Ref.
2013	American Country Awards	Female Video of the Year	Won	
2013	Country Music Association Awards	Music Video of the Year	Nominated	
2013	CMT Music Awards	Video of the Year	Won	
2013	Grammy Awards	Best Country Song	Won	
2013	Grammy Awards	Best Country Solo Performance	Won	
2013	World Music Awards	World's Best Song	Nominated	

== Music video ==
The accompanying music video for "Blown Away" was directed by Randee St. Nicholas and produced by Brandon Bonfiglo for Nicholas Photography. Underwood said that when she first heard the song, she already had ideas of a possible video for it, and wanted it to be a dark Wizard of Oz set in 2012. The singer deemed it "a visual song. You listen to it and you can see everything that is happening. It's so dramatic. I'm not a drama person, but when you can make a movie in song form in three-and-a-half minutes, it's surreal."

A sneak peek of the video was released on June 11, 2012. The music video premiered worldwide on July 30, during a 24-hour exclusive window domestically and internationally on E! News at 7 and 11:30 p.m. ET/PT and on the homepage of E! Online. Prior to the E! premiere, Underwood held a private screening of the video with country radio station KJ97 for over 200 of their listeners in San Antonio, Texas.

Regarding the Wizard of Oz references, Underwood commented that "it was all about having subtle references", such as the plaid shirt and red shoes she wore in the video. When asked if her aim was to generate controversy with the storyline, the singer said that it was not what she was aiming for at all, adding: "I try to stay away from controversy in any form or fashion. It was just such a great story and such a mini-movie, listening to the song, and we really wanted to do it justice in the video". The music video won Video of the Year at the 2013 CMT Music Awards.

=== Synopsis ===
A scene of the video with Underwood as the daughter running back to her home, while a tornado approaches. The singer used subtle references to The Wizard of Oz in the music video.

The video begins with a girl (a young Underwood) studying at home. Her abusive father arrives and asks her if she needs help. She declines his offer, but starts gathering her things to leave the room. As she stands up, he grabs her arm, but she manages to pull away and leave. Underwood has stated that this scene had no script, and that she and the actor acted it out the way they thought it might have happened. She further revealed that she left the filming location with bruises on her arm: "I had finger marks on my arm when I left at the end of the day, so I was like, 'Wow.' ... It was intense. I wasn't just imagining it, it was really intense."

As the video continues, the girl is seen standing in the middle of a cemetery, walking around and staring at the dark clouds as a thunderstorm forms in the sky. She runs back to her house along an old, destroyed yellow brick road, similar to the one in The Wizard of Oz. She enters the house to see her father sleeping on the couch, holding a bottle of alcohol. She sits next to him, recalling the times he let his drunkenness and anger get out of hand. She tries to wake him up but fails, and realizes that he has passed out. Looking out through the window, she sees that the thunderstorm is getting worse. Fearing a tornado, she leaves her father and runs to the cellar alone to protect herself. She's then seen lying in an old bed and crying as she hears the tornado coming closer, with her father still passed out in the house above. The next day, there are no traces of the house, and as the video ends with a dog, some cattle and a rainbow in the sunshine, she calmly walks away.

== Live performances ==
Underwood performed "Blown Away" on American Idol on May 3, 2012, the week of the album's release. Amy Sciarretto of Taste of Country summarized the performance, writing, "Underwood was elevated on steps as she performed, with storm clouds roaring on the screens behind her. She was bathed in light as smoke billowed at feet." The same month, she performed the song at the 2012 Billboard Music Awards, dressed in a long, red gown. The singer also performed it at the 2012 Country Music Association Awards. Throughout the performance, wind machines were used while confetti flew through the air. In 2013, Underwood performed "Blown Away" again at the same award show, this time in a medley with "Good Girl", "See You Again" and "Two Black Cadillacs", representing the ending of the Blown Away era. The same year, she performed an acoustic version of the song during the 55th Annual Grammy Awards. "Blown Away" was performed as the encore of Underwood's Blown Away Tour (2012–13), along with "I Know You Won't".

== Charts ==
=== Weekly charts ===
Chart (2012)	Peak position
Canada Hot 100 (Billboard)	27
Canada Country (Billboard)	1
Scotland Singles (OCC)	100
UK Singles (OCC)	155
US Billboard Hot 100	20
US Adult Pop Airplay (Billboard)	31
US Country Airplay (Billboard)	1
US Hot Country Songs (Billboard)	2
US Pop Airplay (Billboard)	50

=== Year-end charts ===
Chart (2012)	Position
US Billboard Hot 100	70
US Hot Country Songs (Billboard)	32
Chart (2013)	Position
US Hot Country Songs (Billboard)	45

== Certifications ==
Region	Certification	Certified units/sales
Canada (Music Canada)	Platinum	80,000^{*}
United States (RIAA)	5× Platinum	2,819,000
^{*} Sales figures based on certification alone.

== See also ==
- List of number-one country singles of 2012 (U.S.)
