= You Can't Hide Beautiful =

Single by Aaron Lines

from the album Living Out Loud
- Released: August 5, 2002
- Genre: Country
- Length: 3:51
- Label: RCA Nashville
- Songwriters: Michael Dulaney; Jason Sellers
- Producer: Chris Farren

Aaron Lines singles chronology
"I Can Read Your Heart" (2001)	"You Can't Hide Beautiful" (2002)	"Living Out Loud" (2003)

Aaron Lines U.S. singles chronology
"You Can't Hide Beautiful" (2002)	"Love Changes Everything" (2003)

"You Can't Hide Beautiful" is a song written by Michael Dulaney and Jason Sellers, and recorded by Canadian country music artist Aaron Lines. It was released in August 2002 as the first single from Lines' album, Living Out Loud. The song reached number 4 on the Billboard Hot Country Singles & Tracks chart in February 2003. It was also Lines' only entry on the Billboard Hot 100, peaking at number 38.

== Music video ==
The music video was directed by Thom Oliphant and premiered in August 2002.

== Chart performance ==
"You Can't Hide Beautiful" debuted at number 58 on the U.S. Billboard Hot Country Singles & Tracks for the week of August 17, 2002.

Chart (2002–2003)	Peak position
US Hot Country Songs (Billboard)	4
US Billboard Hot 100	38

=== Year-end charts ===
Chart (2003)	Position
US Country Songs (Billboard)	38
