= Living Out Loud (album) =

Studio album by Aaron Lines
- Released: January 7, 2003
- Genre: Country
- Length: 44:27
- Label: RCA Nashville
- Producer: Chris Farren

Aaron Lines chronology
Living Out Loud (2003)	Waitin' on the Wonderful (2005)

Living Out Loud is the debut studio album by Canadian country music singer Aaron Lines. The album was released by RCA Nashville. It was nominated for Country Recording of the Year at the 2004 Juno Awards. In the U.S., the album produced two chart singles in "You Can't Hide Beautiful" and "Love Changes Everything". The former peaked at No. 4 on Hot Country Songs and No. 38 on the Billboard Hot 100, while the latter peaked at No. 39 on the US country charts.

== Track listing ==
No.	Title	Writer(s)	Length
1.	"Love Changes Everything"	Chris Farren, Aaron Lines	3:15
2.	"I Will Be There"	Billy Austin, Greg Barnhill	4:50
3.	"Close"	Farren, Wayne Hector, Steve Mac	4:10
4.	"Living Out Loud"	Michael Dulaney, Farren, Lines	4:04
5.	"Turn It Up (I Like the Sound of That)"	Farren, Lines, Ashley Gorley	3:50
6.	"I Can't Live Without Your Love"	Farren, Lines, Troy Verges	5:38
7.	"You Can't Hide Beautiful"	Dulaney, Jason Sellers	3:51
8.	"Knock on Wood"	Joel Feeney, Lines	3:26
9.	"Old Days New"	Gary Burr, Farren, Lines	4:11
10.	"She Called Me Kansas"	Dulaney, Lines, Michael Lunn	3:38
11.	"You Get the Picture"	Dulaney, Farren, Lines	3:34

== Personnel ==
As listed in liner notes.

- Mike Brignardello – bass guitar
- Tom Bukovac – electric guitar
- Eric Darken – percussion
- Dan Dugmore – pedal steel guitar
- Chris Farren – acoustic guitar, electric guitar, keyboards, Hammond B-3 organ, background vocals
- Joel Feeney – background vocals
- Kim Fleming – background vocals
- Shannon Forrest – drums, drum programming
- Tony Harrell – piano, keyboards, Hammond B-3 organ
- Jeff King – electric guitar, gut string guitar, bouzouki
- Aaron Lines – lead vocals
- Shawn Allan Klaiber – background vocals
- Chris J. McDonald – trombone
- Wendy Moten – background vocals
- Michael Rhodes – bass guitar
- Jason Sellers – background vocals
- Bobby Terry – acoustic guitar, drum programming
- George Tidwell – trumpet

Strings performed by the Nashville String Machine, arranged by Jeff Lippencott and Chris Farren. Carl Gorodetzky, concert master.

== Chart performance ==
Chart (2003)	Peak position
U.S. Billboard Top Country Albums	9
U.S. Billboard 200	68
