= Cheaper to Keep Her (song) =

Single by Aaron Lines

from the album Moments That Matter
- Released: April 30, 2007
- Genre: Country
- Length: 3:26
- Label: Outside the Lines Inc.
- Songwriters: Aaron Lines; Chris Lindsey; Jessica Maros
- Producer: Aaron Lines

Aaron Lines singles chronology
"Seeing Things" (2006)	"Cheaper to Keep Her" (2007)	"Somebody's Son" (2007)

"Cheaper to Keep Her" is a song by Canadian country music artist Aaron Lines. It is the first single released from his 2007 album Moments That Matter. It reached number one on the Billboard Canada Country chart.

== Music video ==
The music video for "Cheaper to Keep Her" features cameos from Rhett Warrener, Darren McCarty, Jamie McLennan, Richie Regehr and Paul Brandt.

== Chart performance ==
Chart (2007)	Peak position
Canada Hot 100 (Billboard)	68
Canada Country (Billboard)	1
