= Chris Tompkins =

American songwriter

- Born: Christopher G. Tompkins; Muscle Shoals, Alabama, U.S.
- Genres: Country music
- Occupation: Songwriter
- Years active: 2002–present
- Label: Big Loud
- Website: Tompkins at Big Loud Shirt

Christopher G. Tompkins (born Muscle Shoals, Alabama) is an American songwriter based in Nashville. Since 2002 he has co-written songs for pop, rock, and country artists Jimmy Buffett, Blake Shelton, Keith Urban, Carrie Underwood, Jason Aldean, and Nickelback and has written charting singles for artists such as Kenny Chesney, Florida Georgia Line, and Tim McGraw.

Tompkins has won two Grammy Awards for Best Country Song, first for "Before He Cheats" sung by Carrie Underwood in 2007, and also for Underwood's 2012 song "Blown Away". Tompkins has written 16 number one hits, and he won Songwriter of the Year by the Alabama Music Hall of Fame in 2007.

== Early life ==
Chris Tompkins was born and raised in Green Hill, Alabama and attended Rogers High School. As a teenager Tompkins started playing in a garage band with Jason Isbell.

== Music career ==
=== 2002–2009: First hits ===
Tompkins signed his first publishing deal at age 22, moving to Nashville, Tennessee. In 2004 Tompkins had his first top 20 hit on the Billboard charts, co-writing "Me and Emily" by Rachel Proctor. He started working with Big Loud Shirt Industries during the summer of 2006 as a songwriter.

He and songwriter Josh Kear wrote the multi-platinum seller "Before He Cheats", sung by Carrie Underwood and released in 2007. It was named 2007 Single of the Year by the Country Music Association. Tompkins won the 2007 MusicRow "Breakthrough Songwriter of the Year" award and was honored as the Alabama Music Hall of Fame songwriter of the year. The following year "Before He Cheats" won several categories at the 50th Grammy Awards, including Country Song of the Year. While at the awards Tompkins befriended Tom Higgenson of the indie rock group Plain White T's. They soon began to collaborate, and Tompkins has since co-written several songs on their albums, including "Welcome To Mystery" featured in the motion picture Almost Alice starring Johnny Depp.

=== 2010–2012: Increased output ===
In 2010 he co-wrote the song "Ain't Back Yet" with Kenny Chesney. The song reached No. 2 on the country charts, and also appeared in Chesney's movie Summertime in 3-D. Also in 2010, He worked on a number of charting singles in 2011, including the Chris Young single "Voices." He co-wrote the duet "I Feel Like a Rockstar" in 2012, performed by Kenny Chesney and Tim McGraw and landed his first Jimmy Buffett cut "Bama Breeze".

He collaborated with Underwood once again on her 2012 album Blown Away, notably on the second single of the same name. The single was co-written with his frequent collaborator Josh Kear, and as noted by interviewer Kurt Wolff, "the melody and overall sound of the song also stand out as something fresh and very different." Tompkins explained to Wolff that "Blown Away" was an "attempt at 'melodic pop' that was 'unique' yet still 'country.'" Tompkins also commented that "Blown Away" is "It's a completely different type of song for Carrie. She's got a lot of pop elements, and I listen to a lot of pop, but I listen to everything from Randy Newman to Mozart to Rihanna to Steely Dan. I think all that stuff shows up in my music, and I think it showed up in 'Blown Away.'" The single peaked at No. 2 on Billboard's Hot Country Songs chart and No. 1 on Billboard's Country Airplay chart and won a Grammy Award for Best Country Song in 2013.

=== 2013–2017: Recent Projects ===
In 2013, Tompkins penned five songs including the number one hits "Round Here" and "Get Your Shine On" on Florida Georgia Line's debut album Here's to Good Times. Following the album's massive success, Tompkins collaborated again with Florida Georgia Line on number one hits like "Dirt" and "Anything Goes", contributing a total of eleven cuts to the band.

Released in April 2014, He also co-wrote the song "Drunk on a Plane", recorded by Dierks Bentley which peaked in the top 3 on Billboard's Hot Country Songs and number one on the Country Airplay chart. The song later went on to be certified 3× Platinum by the RIAA.

== Awards and nominations ==
Year	Award	Nominated work	Category	Result
2007	MusicRow Awards	Chris Tompkins	Breakthrough Songwriter of the Year	Won
2007	Alabama Music Hall of Fame	Chris Tompkins	Songwriter of the Year	Won
2007	Country Music Association Awards	"Before He Cheats"	Single of the Year	Won
2007	Academy of Country Music Awards	"Before He Cheats"	Song of the Year	Nominated
2007	Academy of Country Music Awards	"Before He Cheats"	Single of the Year	Nominated
2007	ASCAP Country Music Awards	"Before He Cheats"	Song of the Year	Won
2007	33rd People's Choice Awards	"Before He Cheats"	Favorite Country Song	Won
2008	50th Grammy Awards	"Before He Cheats"	Song of the Year	Nominated
2013	55th Grammy Awards	"Blown Away"	Country Song of the Year	Won
2013	ASCAP Country Music Awards	"Drunk on You"	Song of the Year	Won
