= Bayou Country Superfest =

Music festival

- Genre: Country
- Locations: Tiger Stadium (LSU), Baton Rouge, Louisiana,
- Years active: 2010–2019
- Founders: Festival Productions and AEG Live

Bayou Country Superfest is a country music festival that has recently been held Memorial Day weekend at Tiger Stadium in Baton Rouge, Louisiana. The 2019 festival returned to Baton Rouge for the 10th Anniversary event on May 25 and 26. Since debuting on May 29, 2010, Bayou Country Superfest has brought together some of the biggest stars in music for a local celebration that began on the campus of Louisiana State University. The festival has included artists such as Taylor Swift, Kenny Chesney, Keith Urban, Carrie Underwood, Miranda Lambert, Brooks & Dunn, Sugarland, Zac Brown Band, Tim McGraw, Luke Bryan, Lady Antebellum, Reba McEntire, George Strait, Jason Aldean, and Blake Shelton.

Bayou Country's expanded schedule in 2014 allowed for the event's largest attendance to date with 135,000 attendees. The festival had an attendance of 125,000 in 2015 and 100,000 in 2016. Due to construction conflicts with Tiger Stadium, the 2017 and 2018 festivals took place at the Mercedes-Benz Superdome in New Orleans.

On January 27, 2020, it was announced that the event was on an indefinite hiatus.

== 2010 ==
May 29	May 30
Taylor Swift; Keith Urban; Kellie Pickler; David Nail; Gloriana	Kenny Chesney; Brooks & Dunn; Jason Aldean; Jake Owen; Justin Moore

== 2011 ==
May 28 & 29
Zac Brown Band
Tim McGraw
Kenny Chesney
Sugarland
Trace Adkins
Billy Currington
Luke Bryan
Jason Michael Carroll
Lee Brice
Josh Thompson

== 2012 ==
May 26 & 27
Keith Urban
Carrie Underwood
Jason Aldean
Rascal Flatts
Eric Church
Sara Evans
Dierks Bentley
Little Big Town
Jerrod Niemann

== 2013 ==
May 25	May 26
Lady Antebellum; Miranda Lambert; Darius Rucker; Thompson Square; Love and Theft	Zac Brown Band; Luke Bryan; The Band Perry; Rodney Atkins; Frankie Ballard

== 2014 ==
May 23, 24, & 25
George Strait
Jason Aldean
Luke Bryan
Reba McEntire
Chris Young
Lee Brice
Florida Georgia Line
Eric Church
Hunter Hayes
Big & Rich
Gloriana
Easton Corbin
Joe Nichols

== 2015 ==
May 23 & 24
Kenny Chesney
Brantley Gilbert
Tyler Farr
Colt Ford
Kristian Bush
Blake Shelton
Miranda Lambert
Kip Moore
David Nail
Cassadee Pope

== 2016 ==
May 27, 28, & 29
Luke Bryan
Lady Antebellum
Little Big Town
Eric Church
Jason Aldean
Dierks Bentley
Darius Rucker
Thomas Rhett
Cole Swindell
Dustin Lynch
Frankie Ballard
Randy Rogers Band
Brothers Osborne
A Thousand Horses

== 2019 ==
May 25 & 26
Bayou Country Superfest 2019 returned to Tiger Stadium in Baton Rouge for the 10th anniversary festival May 25 and 26, as announced on Dec. 20, 2018.

Lineup of Kenny Chesney, Jason Aldean, Kane Brown, Brett Young, and Chase Rice was announced.

== See also ==
- Louisiana State University
- Baton Rouge, Louisiana
