= See You Again (Carrie Underwood song) =

Single by Carrie Underwood

from the album Blown Away
- Released: April 15, 2013
- Length: 4:07
- Label: 19; Arista Nashville
- Songwriters: Carrie Underwood; Hillary Lindsey; David Hodges
- Producer: Mark Bright

Carrie Underwood singles chronology
"Two Black Cadillacs" (2012)	"See You Again" (2013)	"Somethin' Bad" (2014)

Music video
- "See You Again" on YouTube

"See You Again" is a song by American singer and songwriter Carrie Underwood. She co-wrote the song with Hillary Lindsey and David Hodges, while Mark Bright produced it. Released on April 15, 2013, through 19 Recordings and Arista Nashville, it serves as the fourth and final single from Underwood's fourth studio album, Blown Away (2012). "See You Again" was announced in March 2013 and debuted live on the twelfth season of American Idol before being serviced to country and adult contemporary radio formats. It originated from writing sessions for the 2010 film, The Chronicles of Narnia: The Voyage of the Dawn Treader, where it was left unused after another co-written song, "There's a Place for Us" was selected for the soundtrack.

"See You Again" is a power ballad that centers on themes of loss, faith, and reassurance, which reflects Underwood's belief in life after death. While the lyrics address death and farewell directly, Underwood characterized the song as hopeful rather than mournful, framing it as a reflection on moving forward. The song received generally positive responses from critics, who highlighted its sincerity and Underwood's vocal performance, though some noted familiar stylistic elements in its chorus. Commercially, it reached the top ten on Hot Country Songs, peaking at number two on Country Airplay, and earning two platinum certifications in the United States.

Underwood promoted "See You Again" through performances on American Idol and at the 2013 CMA Music Festival, and it later became associated with tribute performances following national tragedies. Its music video, directed by Eric Welch, depicts scenes of loss and reunion inspired by real-life events, including the Sandy Hook Elementary School shooting and the 2013 Moore, Oklahoma tornado.

== Backgroud and release ==
On March 18, 2013, Underwood announced "See You Again" via her Twitter account. She debuted the song on the twelfth season of American Idol on April 4. The song was serviced to country radio on April 15 and Hot/Modern/AC radio on August 26 by Arista Nashville and 19 Recordings. A CD edition, also released by those labels, includes the original album version of the song as well as a radio edit and a version featuring only the hook.

"See You Again" was originally one of three songs written for the 2010 feature film The Chronicles of Narnia: The Voyage of the Dawn Treader. Underwood later explained that she collaborated with Hillary Lindsey and David Hodges after being invited to write for the film, and that the trio completed three songs over several days with the intention of presenting options rather than a single definitive submission. Of the three songs, the workers opted to choose "There's a Place for Us", leaving "See You Again" unused at the time. According to Lindsey, the song was initially considered finished after it was not selected for the soundtrack, but nearly three years later it was revisited when Underwood decided to include it on her album, a development Lindsey later described as "unexpected".

== Composition ==
"See You Again"
Rooted in loss but guided by faith, "See You Again" is framed as hopeful rather than purely mournful.

"See You Again" is a power ballad, written in the key of A♭ music with a vocal range from F_{3} to D♭_{5}. Underwood felt that the lyrics of the song fit naturally on her fourth studio album Blown Away (2012), as the song presents her faith and views on life after death. In the chorus, she sings, "I will see you again, oh / This is not where it ends". The verses further develop this idea through imagery of loss and absence, while emphasizing reassurance rather than despair, with lines such as "But I won't cry / 'Cause I know I'll never be lonely".

Discussing the song's theme, Underwood explained that while losing someone is painful, her faith offers comfort, stating that "having that faith that you're going to see them again is such a comforting thing". Although the lyrics deal directly with death and farewell, Underwood viewed the song as hopeful in tone. She framed it as a reflection on moving forward rather than an expression of grief alone.

== Reception ==
=== Critical response ===
"See You Again" has received positive reviews from music critics. Billboard staff described the song to be "truly a taste of heaven". Dan Milliken of Country Universe gave the song B+ grade, while Kevin John Coyne from the same publication included it in his personal favorite tracks from Blown Away in their 2012 year-end countdown of editors' favorite Country albums of the year, as did Matt Bjorke of Roughstock for their album countdown. Slant Magazine's Jonathan Keefe was less favorable, saying that "the chorus of power ballad 'See You Again' is marred by dated, campy arena-rock clichés."

"See You Again" received two nominations at the 2014 CMT Music Awards, including Video of the Year and Female Video of the Year, winning the former. The song was also nominated for World's Best Song at the 2013 World Music Awards.

=== Commercial performance ===
"See You Again" debuted at number 60 on the US Country Airplay chart for the week of April 13, 2013, peaking at number 2 for the chart dated September 7, 2013. It entered the US Billboard Hot 100 at number 90 for the chart dated May 18, 2013, and peaked at number 34 for the chart of August 31, 2013. It also peaked at number 7 on the US Hot Country Songs chart on August 24, 2013. The single has sold 740,000 copies in the United States as of December 2013, and was certified double platinum by the Recording Industry Association of America (RIAA).

== Live performances ==
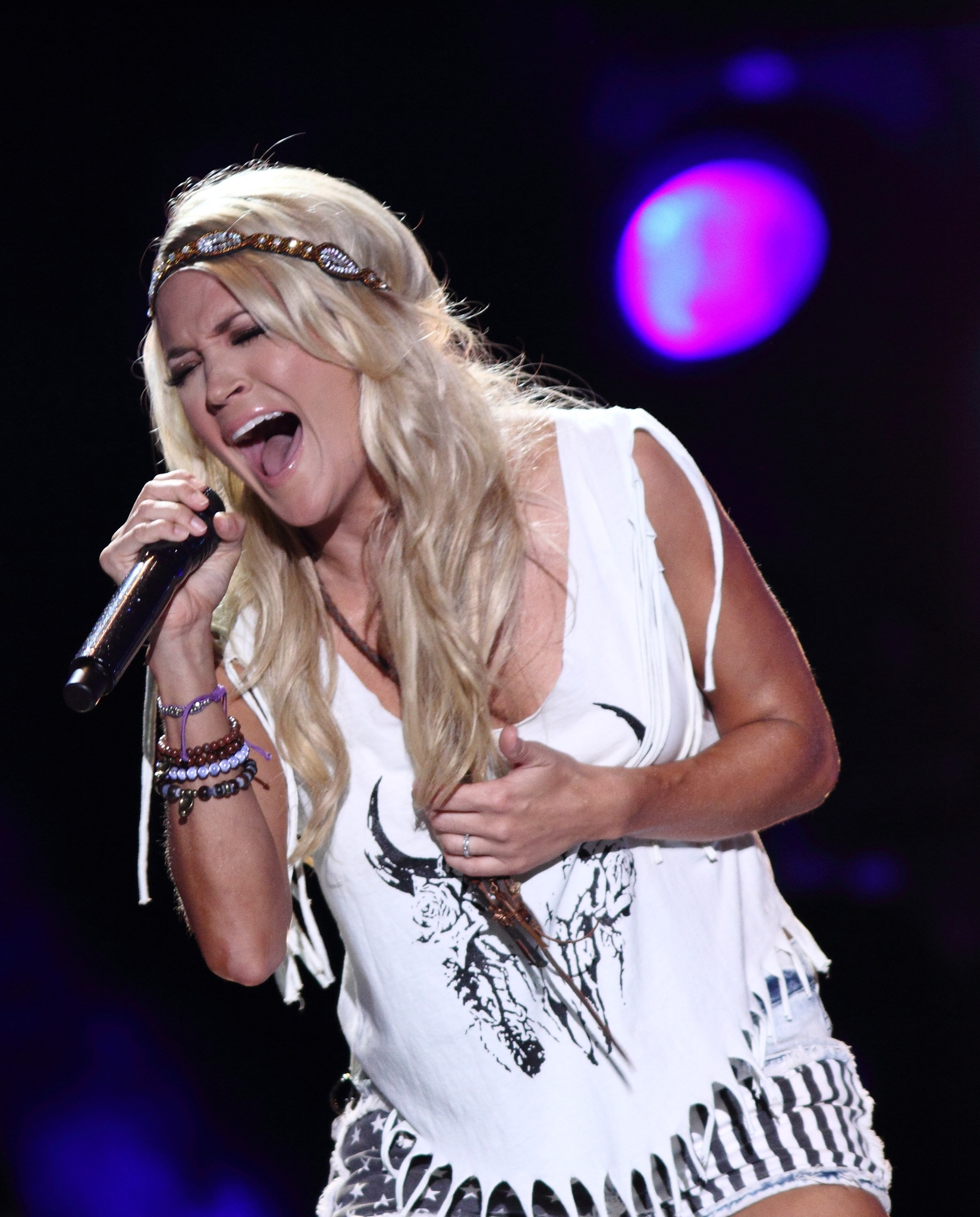
Underwood performing in 2013 CMA Music Festival on June 9

Underwood gave the debut performance of "See You Again" on the twelfth season of American Idol on April 4, 2013. She served as closing headliner at CMA Music Festival on June 9, 2013 and included the song in her set. On June 5, she paid tribute to the victims who lost their lives in tornados that devastated Oklahoma on May 20, performing the song at the CMT Music Awards and donating $1 million toward relief efforts. In 2015, Underwood performed the song while headlining the Big Barrel Country Music Festival in Delaware, where she surprised audiences by incorporating elements of Wiz Khalifa and Charlie Puth's 2015 song of the same name into her song. During the performance, she transitioned into the chorus of the latter, singing "It's been a long day without you, my friend".

On May 13, 2018, she performed it during an episode of American Idol in which she mentored the top five contestants. The song was included in the setlist for her sixth headlining concert, the Cry Pretty Tour 360. Following the passing of Naomi Judd, Underwood dedicated a live performance to the singer in May 2022.

== Music video ==
On June 7, 2013, Good Morning America gave a first look at the music video for "See You Again". The full video premiered soon after on ABC News. Directed by Eric Welch, the music video shows the aftermaths of the Sandy Hook Elementary School shooting and 2013 Moore, Oklahoma, tornado, along with various reunions. In the video, Underwood is in a visual focal point, who appears in softly lit, golden-toned scenes in a flowing white dress.

Christina Vinson of Taste of Country described the imagery as capable of eliciting "pure emotion", noting that the clip juxtaposes moments of "joyful reunions" and "heartbreaking goodbyes" with symbolic elements such as baptism, tombstones, and funeral programs to explore themes of loss, faith, and continuity. She further observed that Underwood's vocals, supported by a backing choir, help shape a video that is ultimately "touching" and "deeply impactful", while remaining centered on human connection rather than narrative exposition.

== Track listing ==
Compact disc

1. See You Again (radio edit) – 3:57
2. See You Again – 4:02
3. See You Again (hook) – 0:15

== Personnel ==
Credits were adapted from Tidal.

- Carrie Underwood – songwriter, associated performer, background vocals
- David Hodges – songwriter, background vocals
- Hillary Lindsey – songwriter, background vocals
- Mark Bright – producer
- Ilya Toshinskiy – acoustic guitar
- Perry Coleman – background vocals
- Jimmie Lee Sloas – bass
- Chris McHugh – drums
- Tom Bukovac – electric guitar
- Charles Judge – keyboards
- Eric Darken – percussion
- Jimmy Nichols – piano
- Mike Johnson – steel guitar

== Charts ==
=== Weekly charts ===
List of weekly chart positions
Chart (2013)	Peak position
Canada Hot 100 (Billboard)	45
Canada AC (Billboard)	25
Canada Country (Billboard)	2
US Billboard Hot 100	34
US Hot Country Songs (Billboard)	7
US Country Airplay (Billboard)	2

=== Year-end charts ===
List of Year-end chart positions
Chart (2013)	Position
US Country Airplay (Billboard)	15
US Hot Country Songs (Billboard)	26

== Certifications ==
Certifications and sales
Region	Certification	Certified units/sales
United States (RIAA)	2× Platinum	2,000,000^{‡}
^{‡} Sales+streaming figures based on certification alone.

== Release history ==
Release dates and formats
Country	Date	Format	Label	Ref.
United States	April 15, 2013	Country radio	Arista Nashville; 19	
United States	August 26, 2013	Hot/Modern/AC radio	Arista Nashville; 19	
United States	—N/a	CD Single	Arista Nashville; 19	
