= Good Girl (Carrie Underwood song) =

2012 single by Carrie Underwood

Single by Carrie Underwood

from the album Blown Away
- Released: February 23, 2012
- Length: 3:25
- Label: 19; Arista Nashville
- Songwriters: Chris DeStefano; Ashley Gorley; Carrie Underwood
- Producer: Mark Bright

Carrie Underwood singles chronology
"Remind Me" (2011)	"Good Girl" (2012)	"Blown Away" (2012)

Music video
- "Good Girl" on YouTube

"Good Girl" is a song by American recording artist Carrie Underwood. The song was written by Chris DeStefano, Ashley Gorley and Underwood. Following its announcement in January 2012, it was released by 19 Recordings and Arista Nashville as the lead single from Underwood's fourth studio album, Blown Away (2012). An uptempo track driven by handclaps, prominent guitar riffs, and dynamic vocal shifts, "Good Girl" features Underwood delivering pointed warnings through sharp, playful imagery. The song was promoted through televised performances, including major award shows and international venues, and was supported by a narrative-driven music video directed by Theresa Wingert, which later won Video of the Year at the 2012 CMT Music Awards.

Commercially, "Good Girl" achieved strong digital sales and radio airplay, reaching number one on Billboard's Hot Country Songs chart and entering the top 20 of the Billboard Hot 100. The single also performed well internationally and received multi-platinum certifications in North America. In addition, the song was featured across various media platforms, including video games and television talent competitions.

== Background and release ==
On January 25, 2012, Underwood announced on her official website that the new single would be released in February. A few days before its official release, Underwood previewed the song in a video posted on her website, giving fans a brief look inside the recording studio. She stated that the single would be released to radio shortly thereafter, and her website confirmed a release date through a countdown feature. The song was finally released for purchase on iTunes, at 10 p.m. on February 23.

== Composition ==
"Good Girl" (2012)
A 19-second sample from "Good Girl".

Underwood co-wrote "Good Girl" with Ashley Gorley and Chris DeStefano, which runs for three minutes and thirty-one seconds. Described as "kick butt" by Underwood, the song is an uptempo song about Underwood at her most fiery, as she moves between near-whispers and pointed shouts over handclaps and a driving guitar riff that builds into a snarling solo, delivering sharp warnings through imagery of sweetness that "drip[s] honey" but ultimately "sting[s] ... like a bee" before surging into a rousing chorus. The track is in C minor with an approximate tempo of 126 beats per minute; rather than using full chords, it is built around a pattern of open fifths composed of C5-F5-E♭5-B♭5. Underwood's vocal ranges from G3 to F5.

== Critical reception ==
Professional ratings
Review scores
Source	Rating
About.com	4/5 stars
Country Universe	A
Roughstock	4/5 stars

Upon its release, "Good Girl" received positive reviews. Roughstock gave the song four stars and praised that the song is "the best uptempo vocal that Carrie Underwood has given country radio". Bill Lamb of About.com gave the song four out of five stars, noting that the song is driven by rock guitar and dynamic vocals, with a singalong chorus described as "pure pop". Bill Dukes of Taste of Country said that by repeated listens, Underwood's confidence, energy, and technical control become increasingly apparent, to the point that her performance feels "perfectly placed". Kevin John Coyne of Country Universe gave the song a grade A, calling it "an absolutely exhilarating record".

== Live performances ==
Underwood performed "Good Girl" on April 1, 2012, at the Academy of Country Music awards. On May 15, she performed it on an episode of Dancing With the Stars. In June, she performed the song at Royal Albert Hall and the CMT Music Awards. Underwood also performed "Good Girl" for the 2022 CMA Music Festival, which aired on August 3.

== Music video ==
The short preview of the music video premiered on Entertainment Tonight on March 12, 2012, and later that night, the full video was released on Underwood's official Vevo page. Directed by Theresa Wingert, the video features Underwood playing a "Good Girl", and another girl trying to persuade her character that the man she is with is no good. The music video for "Good Girl" won Video of the Year at the 2012 CMT Music Awards as voted by fans.

== Commercial performance ==
"Good Girl" had sold 108,000 digital downloads in its first 3 days of sales. As of December 4, 2012, it has been certified Platinum in Canada, with more than 80,000 digital copies being sold. In the United States, the song has sold 3 million copies, on July 2020.

With 3 weeks of airplay, "Good Girl" debuted at number 30 on Billboard's Hot Country Songs and 24 on the Billboard Hot 100, peaking at number 18 on the latter chart; it gave Underwood her twelfth top 20 on the chart. It also debuted at number 33 on the Canadian Hot 100 chart for the week of March 10, 2012. On Hot Country Songs, the song reached atop, being Underwood's twelfth number one hit on the chart and her second highest-charting song on Adult Pop Songs behind "Before He Cheats" (2005), peaking at 20.

== Awards and nominations ==
=== American Country Awards ===
Year	Award	Category	Result	Ref.
2012	"Good Girl"	Female Music Video of the Year	Nominated	
2012	"Good Girl"	Female Single of the Year	Nominated	

=== CMT Music Awards ===
Year	Award	Category	Result	Ref.
2012	"Good Girl"	Video of the Year	Won	
2012	"Good Girl"	Female Video of the Year	Nominated	

=== World Music Awards ===
Year	Award	Category	Result	Ref.
2013	"Good Girl"	World's Best Music Video	Nominated	

== In popular culture ==
"Good Girl" was made available for download on June 26, 2012 for Rock Band 3. The song is also available on the game Just Dance 4 and Guitar Hero Live. Furthermore, "Good Girl" was performed across several seasons of The Voice, including renditions by Adriana Louise during the third season's Live Rounds, Amber Carrington in her Blind Audition on season four, and Kat Perkins during her Instant Save on season six. Perkins later recorded a studio version for her 2014 EP Fearless.

== Charts ==
=== Weekly charts ===
Chart (2012)	Peak position
Canada Hot 100 (Billboard)	21
Canada Country (Billboard)	1
US Billboard Hot 100	18
US Adult Pop Airplay (Billboard)	20
US Hot Country Songs (Billboard)	1

=== Year-end charts ===
Chart (2012)	Position
Canada (Canadian Hot 100)	90
US Billboard Hot 100	66
US Country Songs (Billboard)	27

== Certifications ==
Region	Certification	Certified units/sales
Canada (Music Canada)	Platinum	80,000^{*}
United States (RIAA)	3× Platinum	3,000,000^{‡}
^{*} Sales figures based on certification alone.^{‡} Sales+streaming figures based on certification alone.

== Release history ==
Country	Date	Format	Label	Ref.
Worldwide	February 23, 2012	CD; country radio; digital download; streaming	19; Arista Nashville	
United States	April 23, 2012	Hot AC radio	19; Arista Nashville	
United Kingdom	May 4, 2012	Digital download; streaming	19; Arista Nashville	
