= CMA Fest =

Country music festival in Nashville, Tennessee, USA

- Genre: Country music
- Dates: June
- Location: Nashville, Tennessee
- Years active: 1972–2019, 2022–present
- Founders: Country Music Association
- Organiser: Country Music Association
- Website: cmafest.com

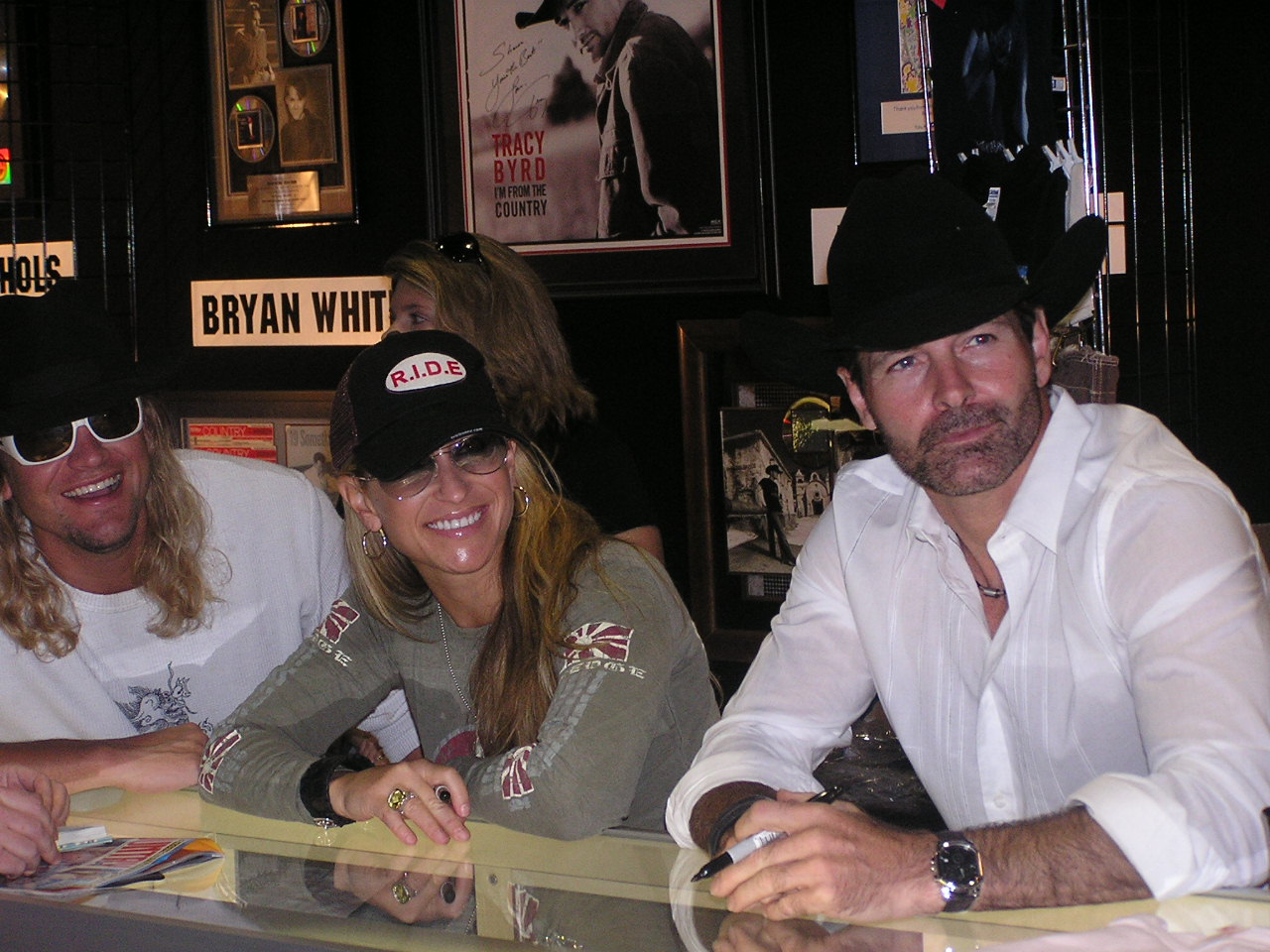
Ira Dean, Heidi Newfield, and Keith Burns of Trick Pony signing autographs at the 2006 CMA Music Festival

CMA Fest, formerly named the CMA Music Festival until 2018, is a four-day festival with country music, hosted each June by the Country Music Association (CMA) in downtown Nashville. Beginning in 1972 under the name Fan Fair, the event now draws approximately 350 artists and celebrities who hold autograph sessions and perform in concerts offered throughout the festival.

Proceeds from the festival benefit music education programs in public schools through the charitable arm of CMA, the CMA Foundation.

== History ==
=== Fan Fair (1972–2003) ===
WSM radio, coordinating with the Country Music Association (CMA), created Fan Fair in 1972 so that fans would refrain from attending the annual radio industry-only convention meant more for disk jockeys and other radio dignitaries that the CMA hosted in the fall. The inaugural Fan Fair was held from April 12–15, 1972, at Nashville's Municipal Auditorium. The inaugural four-day event was attended by 5,000 fans and featured 20 hours of live entertainment and 100 exhibit booths, including autograph booths. In 1973, Fan Fair was moved to June in the hope of finding better weather conditions and attracting more visitors—attendance doubled to 10,000 fans. In the third year, Paul McCartney, the first non-country musician in the lineup, was invited to perform, and Dolly Parton and Porter Wagoner performed a duet for the last time before dissolving as a partnership.

By 1982, the festival was moved to the Nashville Fairgrounds, and the All American Country Games competition was added. This event, which raised money for the Tennessee Special Olympics, was canceled in 1989 to add more shows. In 1991, singer Kathy Mattea attended Fan Fair despite being under doctor's orders not to speak or sing, so that her injured vocal cords could heal. She used a computer to type messages for her fans to read as she held "conversations" with them.

Garth Brooks decided at the last minute to attend the 25th anniversary of the festival in 1996. He was swarmed with fans, and stayed in his booth signing autographs for 23 hours and 10 minutes without a single break. Fan Fair underwent major changes in 2001. For the first time, the event was held over a long weekend (Thursday, June 14 to Sunday, June 17) instead of during the work week. At the same time, the festival moved from its long-time home at the fairgrounds to several sites clustered in downtown Nashville, including Nissan Stadium, the Nashville Convention Center, Bridgestone Arena, and Riverfront Park. The fairgrounds itself was converted to a temporary campground for attendees.

Until 2001, the evening concerts were organized by record labels, with each label choosing which of its artists would be able to perform, and the length of the appearance. Beginning with Fan Fair 2001, these main concerts were grouped instead by record distribution group. This allowed for four main concerts, for Sony, WEA/EMI, UNI, and BMG. The artists are not paid to attend the festival or for their performances during it.

=== CMA Music Festival (since 2004) ===
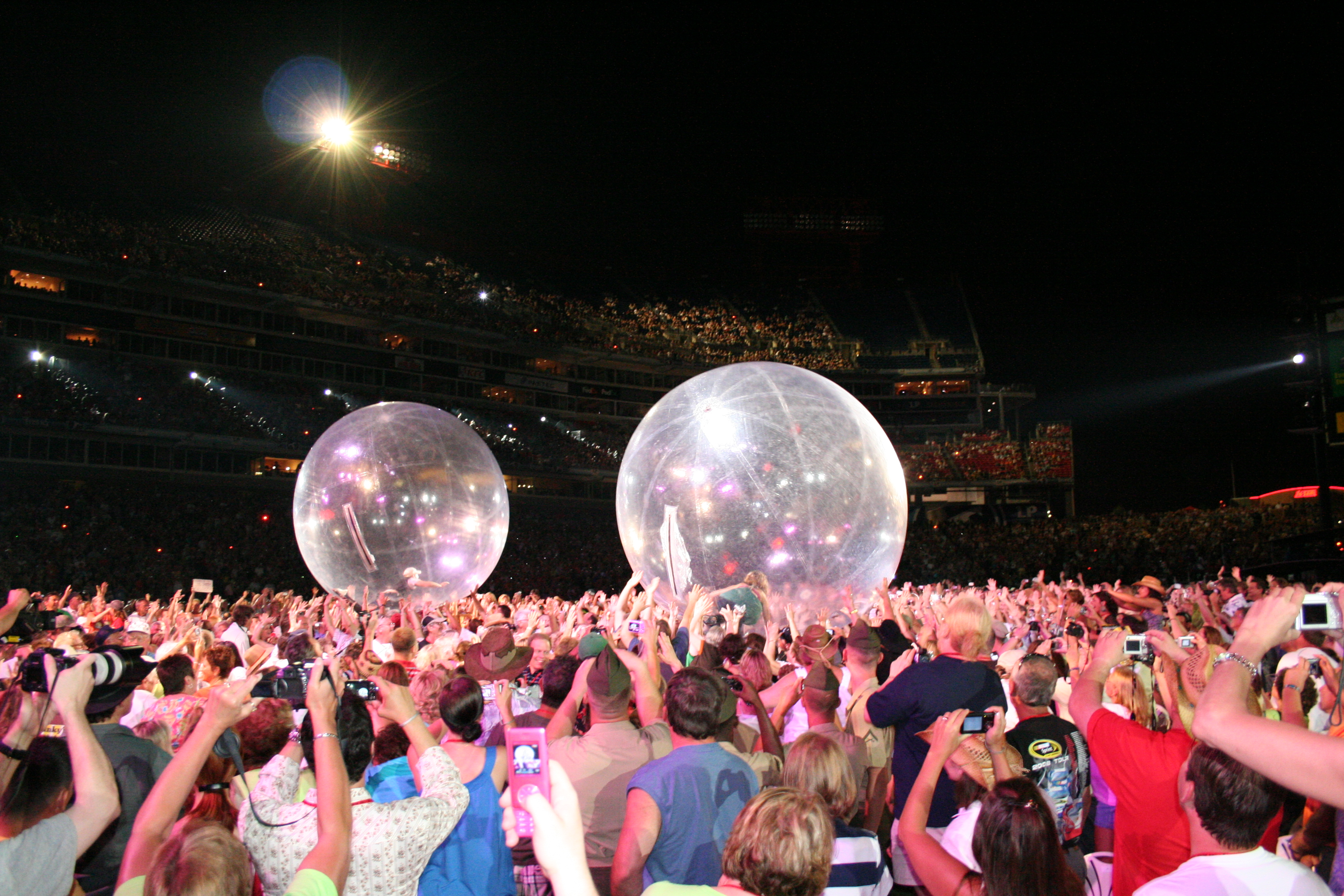
Sugarland performing at the 2008 CMA Music Festival

In 2004, the CMA renamed the event to the CMA Music Festival in order to change negative perceptions, embrace the CMA brand, and expand its appeal. Also in 2004, the ABC network televised the event as a two-hour special known as CMA Music Festival: Country's Night to Rock. The first special, which aired on July 14, 2004, ranked No. 16 in viewers, with an estimated 9 million people tuning in. The annual special, re-edited from the three days of events, continues to air on ABC as of the present.

A new attendance record was set in 2007 with 191,154 fans attending. Those in attendance participated in more than 100 hours of concerts, 30 hours of organized autograph signings, family activities, celebrity sports competitions, interactive exhibits, giveaways, games and other activities. Over 400 celebrities made appearances at the 2007 CMA Music Festival. The name was changed to CMA Fest in 2018. The festival went on hiatus in 2020 and 2021 due to the COVID-19 pandemic, but returned in 2022.

== Attendance ==
Through 2000, the CMA Music Festival was considered a sell-out if 25,000 people attended. Attendees span all ages, from infants to the elderly and come from 41 countries, including Canada, France, Australia, Germany, the United Kingdom, China, Japan, and Russia. After moving to its new, larger and air-conditioned home in 2001, attendance numbers soared, with the 2002 festival drawing 126,000 fans. Attendance slipped slightly the following year, partially because many of the more-renowned country music stars declined to appear at the festival. However, in 2003, attendance was down only 1.7% over the year before, compared to a 25% decline in overall U.S. tourist travel for the same period. The attendance slippage was not permanent; in 2007, a record-breaking crowd of 191,000 people attended the festival.

In 2010 and 2011, a record 65,000 people a day were estimated to have attended ticketed and free events. In 2011, total combined attendance for the four-day event was estimated to have exceeded 250,000 people at ticketed events and in free areas. Visitors came from 41 nations, and all 50 US states.

In 2015, tickets sold out seven months in advance and had a record-setting attendance of 87,680 fans attending the event besting 2014 by 9.6%. In 2022, the festival returned for the first time (1099 days) since closing during the COVID-19 pandemic and sold out with fans from across the US and 39 countries.

== See also ==
- List of country music festivals
