= Josh Kear =

American songwriter

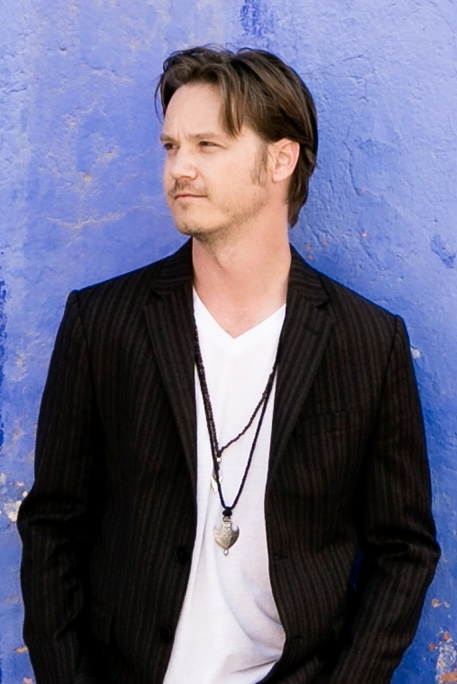
- Kear in 2018

Background information
- Born: Joshua Peter Kear
- Genres: Country; pop
- Occupation: Songwriter
- Years active: 1996–present

Joshua Peter Kear is a multi-Grammy Award winning songwriter based in Nashville, Tennessee.

In 2007, Kear co-wrote Carrie Underwood's hit "Before He Cheats" with Chris Tompkins. The song dominated the US Hot Country Songs chart for five weeks and earned a Grammy Award for Best Country Song. The song is one of the longest-charting hits in Billboard history, and was the third longest-running hit of the 2000s decade.

In 2011, Kear co-wrote "Need You Now" with Lady Antebellum. The track held the top position on the country chart for five weeks and remained at number one on the adult contemporary chart for 14 weeks. The song received two Grammy Awards in 2011, achieving recognition as both Country Song of the Year and Overall Song of the Year. "Need You Now" was also awarded the ASCAP Global Impact Award.

In 2013, Kear received his third Grammy Award for Country Song of the Year with "Blown Away" which he co-wrote with Chris Tompkins. He made history as the first songwriter to secure the Country Song of The Year Grammy on three occasions. In the same year, he received the title of ASCAP Country Songwriter of the Year at the 51st annual ASCAP Country Music Awards.

Kear has been credited for numerous chart-topping songs in the country music genre. Among his notable works, Lee Brice's "Drinking Class" was the most played country song on the Billboard Country Airplay chart in 2015. He also penned Luke Bryan's "Most People Are Good," which held the number one spot on the same chart for three consecutive weeks, as well as Dierks Bentley's "Woman, Amen" and Runaway June's "Buy My Own Drinks." Additionally, Kear has written or co-written several other number one songs, such as Florida Georgia Line's "God, Your Mama and Me," Tim McGraw's "Highway Don't Care," Dierks Bentley's "Drunk on a Plane," Blake Shelton's "Neon Light," Carrie Underwood's "Blown Away," Frankie Ballard's "Helluva Life," and Luke Bryan's "Drunk On You."

His recent singles include "Ghost Story" by Carrie Underwood, "No Body" by Blake Shelton, and "Watermelon Moonshine" by Lainey Wilson.

Kear has received over twenty ASCAP country airplay awards, two ASCAP pop airplay awards, and three ASCAP country Song of the Year awards for "Before He Cheats", "Need You Now" and "Drunk On You".

Kear is an advocate for songwriter's rights. He has appeared before the Senate Judiciary Committee, together with Smokey Robinson, advocating for American songwriters and aiding in the passage of the Music Modernization Act. In 2014, he participated in a performance for the Library of Congress as part of ASCAP's "We Write The Songs" series, joining the likes of Randy Newman, Carly Simon and Heart. Additionally, Kear co-created the theme song for ASCAP's 100th Anniversary, "More Than The Stars", in collaboration with various songwriters including Ne-Yo, Dan Wilson, Stargate, and Bill Withers.

In June 2020, Kear entered into a global publishing agreement with Sony/ATV Publishing.

== Selected artists who have recorded Josh Kear's songs ==
- A Great Big World
- Adele
- Andrea Bocelli
- Backstreet Boys
- Billy Ray Cyrus
- Blake Shelton
- Big & Rich
- Boyzone
- Carly Pearce
- Carrie Underwood
- Charlie Puth
- Chris Lane
- Chris Tomlin
- Chris Young
- Cole Swindell
- Dan Tyminski
- Danielle Bradbery
- Darius Rucker
- Dierks Bentley
- Ellie Goulding
- Eli Young Band
- Florida Georgia Line
- Frankie Ballard
- Gabby Barrett
- Gary Allan
- Garth Brooks
- Gloriana
- Gretchen Wilson
- Gwyneth Paltrow
- Hank Williams Jr.
- Jessie James Decker
- Jimmy Buffett
- Joe Nichols
- Kenny Rogers
- Keith Urban
- Kevin Borg
- Kip Moore
- Labrinth
- Lady A
- Lainey Wilson
- Lee Brice
- Lindsay Ell
- LoCash
- Luke Bryan
- Mark Wills
- Martina McBride
- Meghan Trainor
- Mickey Guyton
- Mitchell Tenpenny
- Morgan Evans
- Runaway June
- Susan Boyle
- Taylor Swift
- Tenille Townes
- Thomas Rhett
- Tim McGraw
- Tyler Farr
- Van Zant
- Walker Hayes
- "Weird Al" Yankovic
