= Carrie Underwood =

American country singer and songwriter (born 1983)

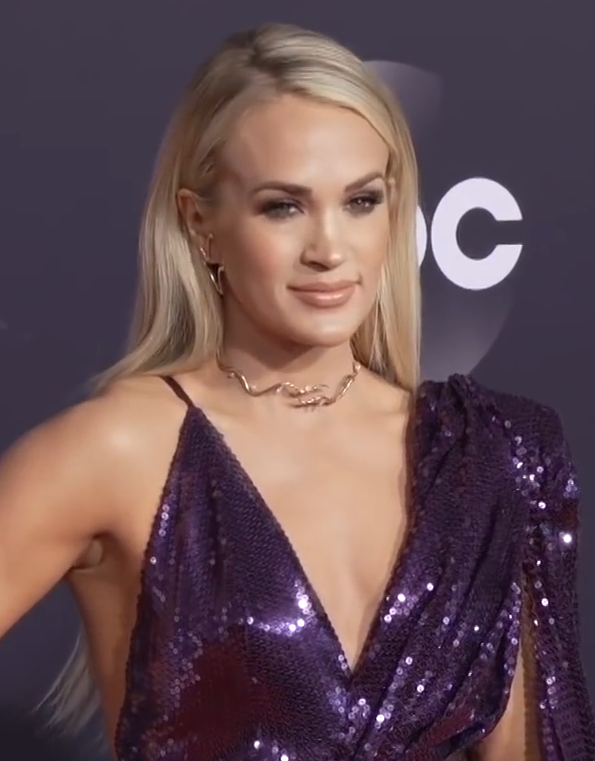
- Underwood in 2019
- Born: Carrie Marie Underwood; March 10, 1983 (age 43); Muskogee, Oklahoma, U.S.
- Occupations: Singer; songwriter
- Years active: 2005–present
- Organization: C.A.T.S. Foundation
- Works: Discography; songs recorded; songs written
- Spouse: Mike Fisher (m. 2010)
- Children: 2
- Awards: Full list
- Musical career
- Genres: Country; gospel
- Instruments: Vocals; guitar; piano
- Labels: 19; Arista; Capitol; MCA Nashville
- Website: carrieunderwoodofficial.com

Signature
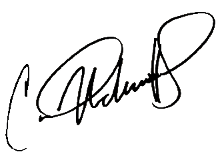

Carrie Marie Fisher (née Underwood; born March 10, 1983) is an American singer and songwriter. Known for her vocal range and dynamic stage presence, Underwood is regarded as a pivotal figure in 21st-century country music. She has revitalized and sustained the presence of female country artists in popular culture since winning the fourth season of American Idol in 2005.

Her first single, "Inside Your Heaven" in 2005, made her the first-ever country artist to debut atop the US Billboard Hot 100 and the only solo country artist to top the Hot 100 in the 2000s. Led by crossover singles "Jesus, Take the Wheel" and "Before He Cheats", her first album, Some Hearts (2005), became the best-selling debut album of all time by a solo female country artist, was ranked by Billboard as the top country album of the 2000s, and won her three Grammy Awards—including Best New Artist. Thereafter, Carnival Ride (2007) sold over half a million copies first-week and won two Grammy Awards, while Play On (2009) made her the only woman ever to have eleven consecutive top-two singles and the first since the 1980s to attain ten number-ones at country radio.

She achieved the second-best selling female album released in 2012 and won a Grammy Award with Blown Away. A commercial success in 2014, her compilation album spawned the Grammy-winning crossover single "Something in the Water". Storyteller (2015) made her the only country artist to have all first five studio albums reach the top two on the US Billboard 200, while Cry Pretty had the largest female album debut of 2018 and made her the only woman to top the Billboard 200 with four country studio albums. In the 2020s, she has released the Christmas album My Gift (2020), won the Grammy Award for Best Roots Gospel Album with the gospel album My Savior (2021), and reinforced her country pop image with Denim & Rhinestones in 2022.

One of the best-selling music artists, Underwood is the highest-certified female country artist by total US units sold (over 95 million albums and singles) and by digital single sales (over 72 million). She is the female artist with the most number-one singles (16) on the US Country Airplay chart, while "Before He Cheats" is the highest-certified solo female country song. Billboard ranked her as the top female country artist of the 2000s and 2010s, while Pollstar ranked her among the 15 highest-grossing female touring artists of the last four decades. Her accolades include eight Grammy Awards, the most Billboard Music Awards (12) and American Music Awards (17) among female country artists, seven Guinness World Records, as well as inductions into the Hollywood Walk of Fame and the Grand Ole Opry. Additionally, Rolling Stone hailed her as "the female vocalist of her generation in any genre", Time listed her as one of the 100 most influential people in the world in 2014 and Forbes declared her the most successful American Idol winner. She further starred as Maria von Trapp in the television special The Sound of Music Live! (2013), has performed and co-written the NBC Sunday Night Football intro song since 2013, and been a judge on American Idol since 2025.

== Early life ==
Carrie Marie Underwood was born on March 10, 1983, in Muskogee, Oklahoma, to Barbara Carole Underwood (née Shatswell) and Stephen Bryan Underwood. She has two older sisters, Shanna and Stephanie, and was raised on her parents' farm in the nearby rural town of Checotah. Her father worked in a paper mill while her mother taught elementary school. During her childhood, Underwood performed at Robbins Memorial Talent Show, and sang at her local church, First Free Will Baptist Church. She later sang for local events in Checotah, including Old Settler's Day and the Lions Club.

A local admirer arranged for her to go to Nashville when she was 14 to audition for Capitol Records. In 1997, Capitol Records was preparing a contract for Underwood but canceled it when company management changed. Underwood said of the event, "I honestly think it's a lot better that nothing came out of it now, because I wouldn't have been ready then. Everything has a way of working out."

While at Checotah High School, she was an Honor Society member, a cheerleader, and played basketball and softball. Underwood graduated from Checotah High School in 2001 as salutatorian. She did not initially pursue singing after graduation and once said "After high school, I pretty much gave up on the dream of singing. I had reached a point in my life where I had to be practical and prepare for my future in the 'real world'".

She attended Northeastern State University in Tahlequah, Oklahoma, graduating magna cum laude, in 2006, with a bachelor's degree in mass communication and an emphasis in journalism. She spent part of one of her summers as a page for Oklahoma State Representative Bobby Frame. She also waited tables at a pizzeria, worked at a zoo, and worked at a veterinary clinic. Underwood is an alumna of the Alpha Iota chapter of Sigma Sigma Sigma sorority.

For two summers, she performed in Northeastern State University's Downtown Country show in Tahlequah. She competed in numerous beauty pageants at the university and was selected as Miss NSU runner-up in 2004.

== Career ==
=== 2004–2005: American Idol ===
American Idol season 4 performances and results
Episode	Theme	Song	Original artist	Order	Result
Auditions	Contestant's choice	"I Can't Make You Love Me"	Bonnie Raitt	N/A	Advanced
Hollywood	Contestant's choice	"Young Hearts Run Free"	Candi Staton	N/A	Advanced
Top 75	Contestant's choice	"Independence Day"	Martina McBride	N/A	Advanced
Top 24 (12 women)	Contestant's choice	"Could've Been"	Tiffany	5	Safe
Top 20 (10 women)	Contestant's choice	"Piece of My Heart"	Erma Franklin	9	Safe
Top 16 (8 women)	Contestant's choice	"Because You Love Me"	Jo Dee Messina	3	Safe
Top 12	Song of the 1960s	"When Will I Be Loved"	The Everly Brothers	11	Safe
Top 11	Billboard number ones	"Alone"	i-TEN	2	Safe
Top 10	1990s	"Independence Day"	Martina McBride	8	Safe
Top 9	Classic Broadway	"Hello, Young Lovers"	The King and I cast	3	Safe
Top 8	Year they were born	"Love Is a Battlefield"	Pat Benatar	7	Safe
Top 7	1970s dance music	"MacArthur Park"	Richard Harris	2	Safe
Top 6	21st Century	"When God-Fearin' Women Get the Blues"	Martina McBride	1	Safe
Top 5	Leiber & Stoller	"Trouble"	Elvis Presley	5	Safe
Top 5	Current Billboard chart	"Bless the Broken Road"	Nitty Gritty Dirt Band	10	Safe
Top 4	Country	"Sin Wagon"	Dixie Chicks	1	Safe
Top 4	Gamble & Huff	"If You Don't Know Me by Now"	Harold Melvin & the Blue Notes	5	Safe
Top 3	Clive Davis' choice	"Crying"	Roy Orbison	3	Safe
Top 3	Contestant's choice	"Making Love Out of Nothing at All"	Air Supply	6	Safe
Top 3	Judge's choice (Randy Jackson)	"Man! I Feel Like a Woman!"	Shania Twain	9	Safe
Final 2	Idol single	"Inside Your Heaven"	Carrie Underwood/Bo Bice	2	Winner
Final 2	Contestant's choice	"Independence Day"	Martina McBride	4	Winner
Final 2	Producer's choice	"Angels Brought Me Here"	Guy Sebastian	6	Winner

In mid-2004, Underwood auditioned for American Idol in St. Louis, Missouri, singing Bonnie Raitt's "I Can't Make You Love Me". After she sang "Could've Been" by Tiffany on the top 12 girls night, judge Simon Cowell commented that she would be one of the favorites to win the competition. During the top 11 finalists' performance on the March 22, 2005, Idol episode, Underwood sang a rendition of the number one 1980s rock hit "Alone", made famous by Heart, and Cowell correctly predicted that Underwood would not only win the competition, but she would also outsell all previous Idol winners. One of the show's producers later said she dominated the voting, winning every week by a large margin. On May 25, 2005, Underwood became the season four winner. Her winnings included a recording contract worth at least a million dollars, use of a private jet for a year, and a Ford Mustang convertible.

=== 2005–2007: Some Hearts and breakthrough ===
Underwood's music career began with the release of her first single, "Inside Your Heaven", on June 14, 2005. The song debuted at number 1 on the Billboard Hot 100, with Underwood becoming only the third artist to debut in the top slot since chart policy changed in 1998. She also broke Billboard chart history as the first country music artist ever to debut at number 1 on the Hot 100 and the song became the first song from a country artist to go to number 1 on the Hot 100 since country group Lonestar's "Amazed" did so in 2000. "Inside Your Heaven" is the only single by a solo country artist in the decade of 2000–2009 to reach number 1 on the Billboard Hot 100 chart. It also debuted at number 1 on the Billboard Pop 100 and on the Canadian Singles Chart, topping it for seven consecutive weeks, becoming the longest-running number one single of 2005 in Canada. It sold nearly one million copies and was certified Platinum by the RIAA and double platinum by the CRIA.

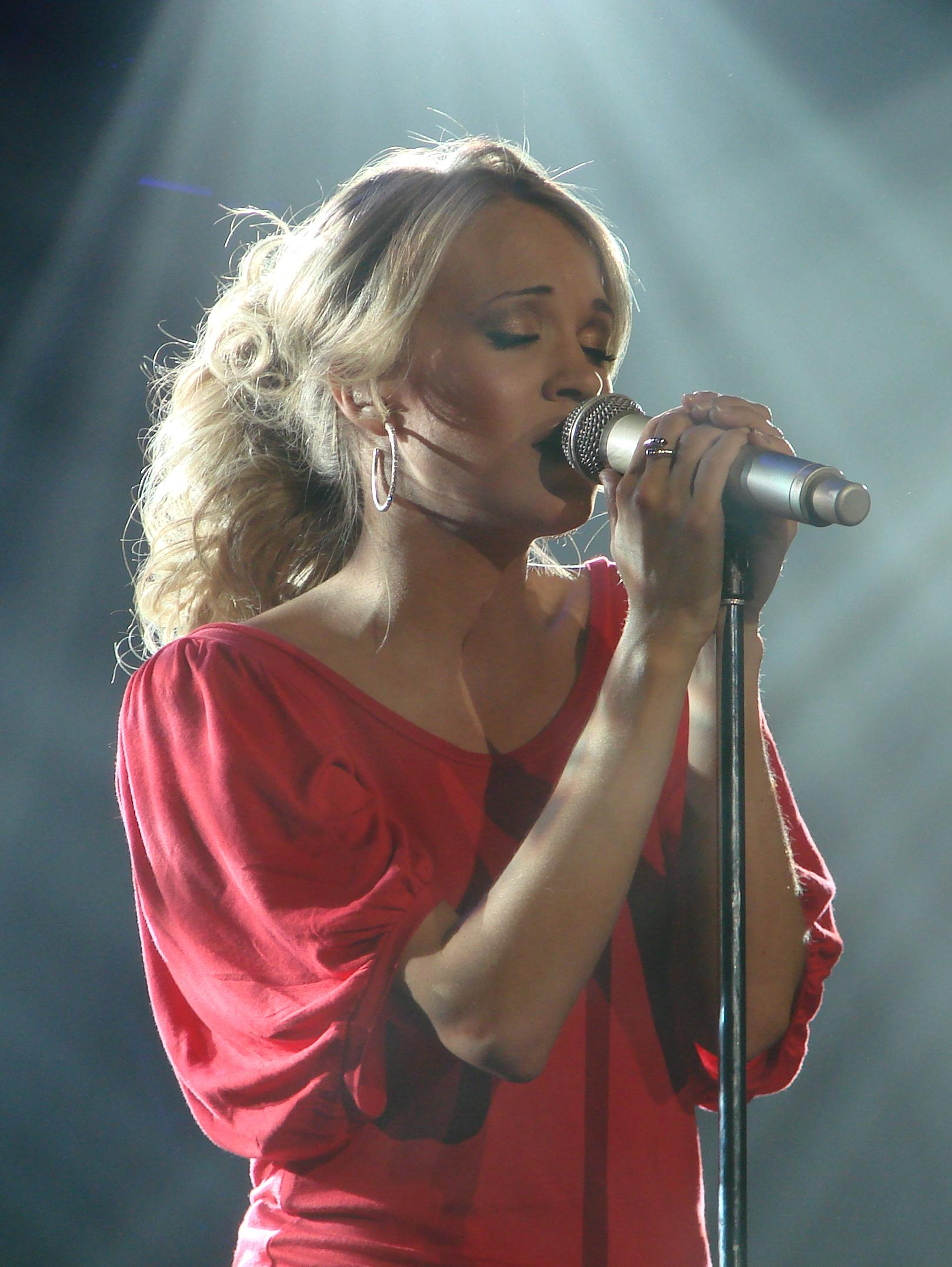
Underwood performing at the World Arena in December 2006

Underwood's debut album, Some Hearts, was released on November 15, 2005, entering the Billboard charts with 315,000 copies sold, debuting at number 1 on the Billboard Top Country Albums and at number 2 on the Billboard 200. The large first week sales of Some Hearts made it the biggest debut of any country artist since the advent of the SoundScan system in 1991. Some Hearts became the best-selling album of 2006 in all genres in the United States. The album was also the best-selling country album of both 2006 and 2007, making Underwood the first female artist in Billboard history to earn back-to-back honors for Top Country Album. Additionally, it was the best-selling female country album of 2005, 2006, and 2007. Some Hearts has since become the fastest-selling debut country album in the history of the SoundScan era, the best-selling solo female debut album in country music, the best-selling Country album of the last 14 years, and the best-selling album by an American Idol alumni in the US. The album is certified nine times platinum by the RIAA, the highest album certification of any country artist to emerge since 2000.

The album's second single, "Jesus, Take the Wheel" was released to radio in October and later peaked at number 1 on the Billboard Hot Country Songs, topping it for six consecutive weeks, and at number 20 on the Hot 100. The song sold over two million copies and was certified triple Platinum by the RIAA. Underwood's third single, "Some Hearts", was also released in October, but exclusively to pop radio, peaking in the top thirty of the adult contemporary charts. "Don't Forget to Remember Me", her fourth single, also proved successful, reaching number 2 on the Hot Country Songs chart. Later that autumn, Underwood's third country single, "Before He Cheats", hit number 1 on Billboard's Hot Country Songs, staying there for five consecutive weeks. The song peaked at number 8 on the Billboard Hot 100, achieving the slowest climb ever to the top ten of the Billboard Hot 100, breaking the record that was previously held by Creed from July 2000. In February 2008, when it was certified double Platinum, "Before He Cheats" became the first country song to ever be certified multi-platinum. It has now been certified 11× Platinum, selling more than eleven million copies, and is the fourth best-selling country digital song of all time. On April 11, 2007, Underwood continued her streak of top Country singles with the release of "Wasted", which peaked at number 1 on the Hot Country Songs chart, sold more than one million copies and was certified Platinum by the RIAA. In August 2008, the "Jesus, Take the Wheel" ringtone was reported to have been certified Platinum, making Underwood the first country artist ever to have two songs hit Platinum Mastertone status together with "Before He Cheats", which had been certified earlier in 2007. Underwood started her first headlined tour, Carrie Underwood: Live 2006, with dates across North America, in April 2006.

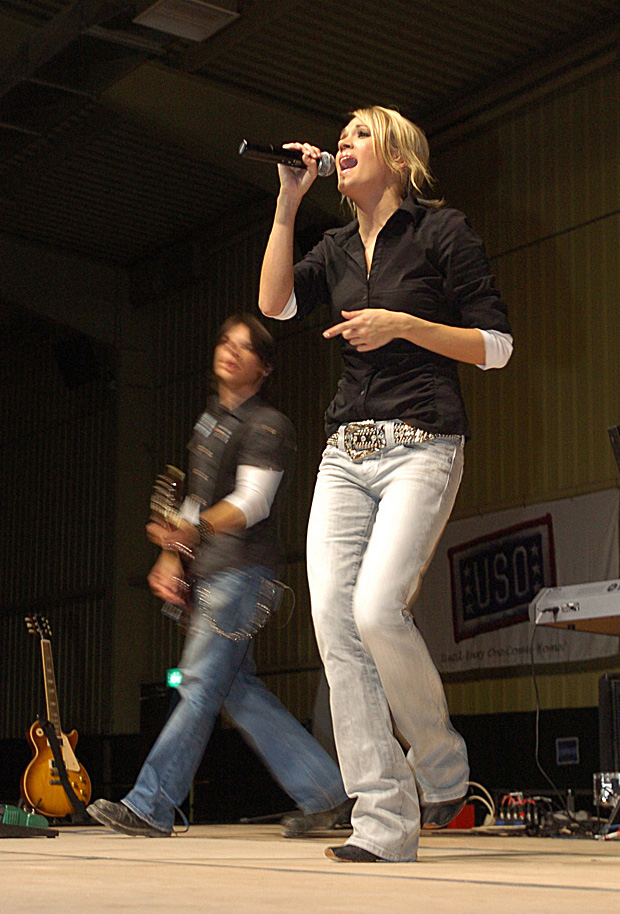
Underwood performing in Iraq in December 2006

At the 2005 Billboard Music Awards, her hit song "Inside Your Heaven" won the coveted Top-Selling Hot 100 Song of the Year award and also Top-Selling Country Single of the Year award, and she won Country Single Sales Artist of the Year. At the 2006 Academy of Country Music Awards, she won Top New Female Vocalist and Single of the Year, for "Jesus, Take the Wheel". At the 2006 Country Music Association Awards, she won both the Horizon Award (now New Artist of the Year) and Female Vocalist of the Year. At the 2006 CMT Music Awards, Underwood won both the Breakthrough Video of the Year and Female Video of the Year for "Jesus, Take The Wheel". She later won the Breakthrough Artist of the Year Award at the American Music Awards, and was also nominated for Favorite Female Country Artist. She won five awards at the 2006 Billboard Music Awards that December, including the coveted Album of the Year, Top 200 Female Artist of the Year, Female Country Artist, New Country Artist, and Country Album of the Year. That year, Underwood also won a Gospel Music Association (GMA) Dove Award for Country Recorded Song of the Year, for "Jesus, Take The Wheel". At the Academy of Country Music Awards in 2007, Underwood won Album of the Year, Video of the Year, and Female Vocalist of the Year. She was nominated for "World's Best Selling New Artist" at the 2006 World Music Awards. At the 2007 CMT Awards in Nashville, Tennessee, on April 16, Underwood's "Before He Cheats" won three awards, including Video of the Year, Female Video of the Year, and Video Director of the Year. Underwood won two awards at the 2007 Country Music Association Awards: Female Vocalist of the Year, for the second consecutive time, and Single Record of the Year, for "Before He Cheats".

In 2007, at the 49th Grammy Awards, Some Hearts received four Grammy nominations and Underwood won her first two Grammy Awards: Best New Artist and Best Female Country Vocal Performance for "Jesus, Take the Wheel. By winning the Best New Artist Grammy Award, Underwood became only the second country artist to ever win the award in the 56-year history of the Grammy Awards, following LeAnn Rimes (1997). She sang the Eagles song "Life in the Fast Lane" alongside Grammy nominees Rascal Flatts. She also sang the Eagles' "Desperado" to honor Don Henley of The Eagles. She also paid tribute to Bob Wills and His Texas Playboys by performing "New San Antonio Rose". At the 50th Grammy Awards, in 2008, Underwood was nominated for two more Grammys: Best Female Country Vocal Performance, for "Before He Cheats" and Best Country Collaboration with Vocals, for "Oh, Love" a duet with Brad Paisley. She won one Grammy Award that night, for Best Female Country Vocal Performance, and performed "Before He Cheats" at the ceremony.

In December 2005, Underwood was named Oklahoman of the Year by Oklahoma Today. In December 2006, Underwood joined Tony Bennett, Michael Bublé, and Josh Groban to sing "For Once in My Life" on The Oprah Winfrey Show. That same month, she paid tribute to Dolly Parton, by singing "Islands in the Stream" with Kenny Rogers (originally by Parton and Rogers) at the Kennedy Center Honors, which honored Parton that year. Underwood performed with the USO Christmas Tour in Iraq during the 2006 Holiday season. Underwood also performed at the 2007 Idol Gives Back concert, singing "I'll Stand By You", a cover of The Pretenders hit. Her version of the song debuted at number 6 on Billboard's Hot 100 Songs.

In 2007, Forbes reported that Underwood earned over $7 million between June 2006 and June 2007. Also in 2007, Victoria's Secret named Underwood the Sexiest Female Musician.

=== 2007–2009: Carnival Ride and commercial success ===
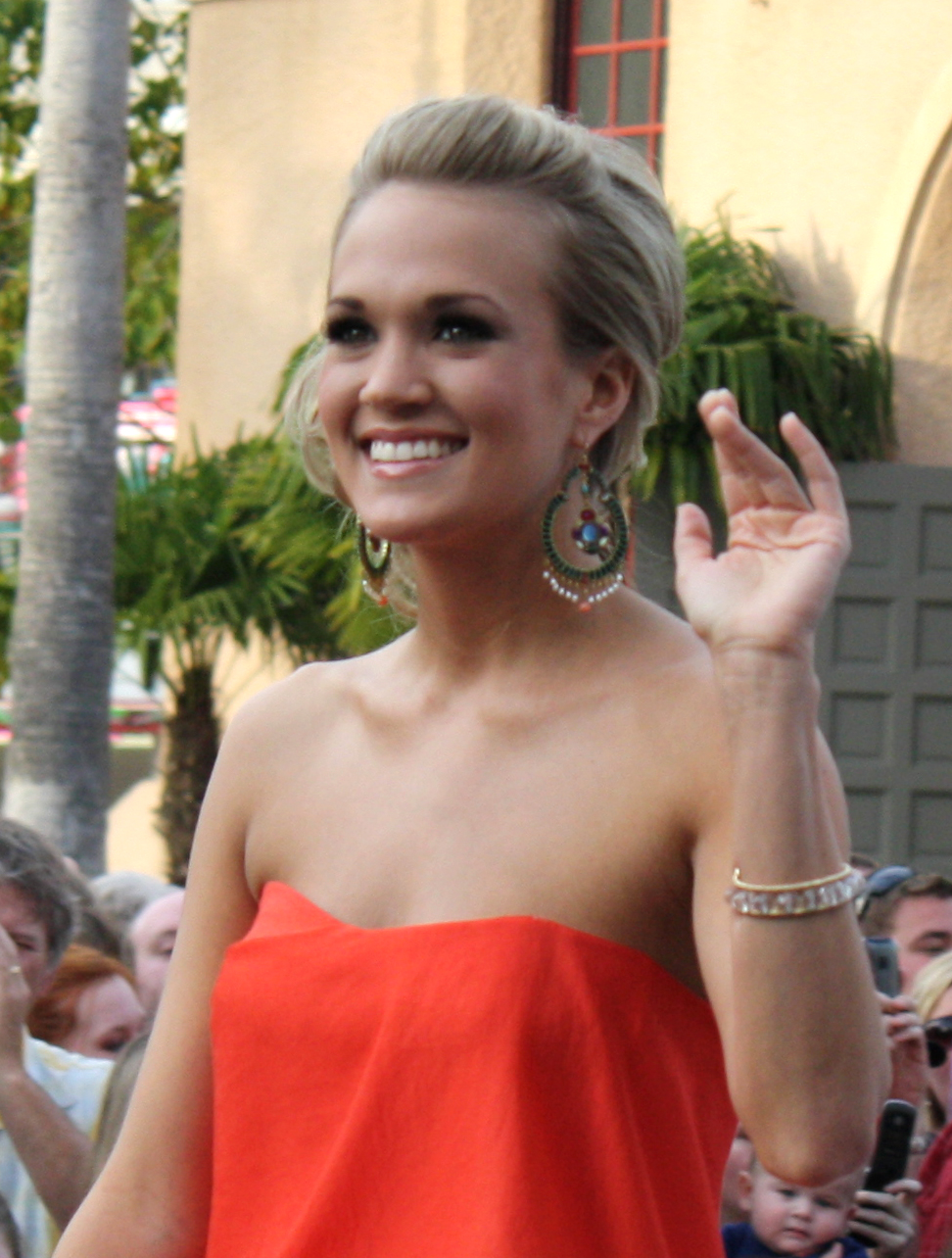
Underwood at the American Idol Experience premiere in February 2009

Underwood's second album, Carnival Ride, was released in October 2007. On Carnival Ride, Underwood was more involved in the songwriting process; she set up a writers' retreat at Nashville's Ryman Auditorium to collaborate with such Music Row tunesmiths as Hillary Lindsey, Craig Wiseman, Rivers Rutherford, and Gordie Sampson. Carnival Ride moved over 527,000 copies in its first week, debuting at number 1 on both the Billboard 200 and Top Country Albums, as well as number 1 on the Canadian Albums Chart, one of the biggest first-week sales by a female artist. Carnival Ride was certified double platinum in just two months after its release in December. The album is now certified four times Platinum by the RIAA. "So Small", the first single from the album, was released in July 2007 and reached number 1 on Billboard's Hot Country Songs, topping it for three consecutive weeks.

"All-American Girl", the second single, also reached number one on the Hot Country Songs chart. The next single, "Last Name", reached number one on the Hot Country Song chart as well. This made Underwood the first female artist to have two consecutive albums each release three number ones on this chart since Shania Twain in 1998. "Just a Dream", the album's next single, was released in July 2008 and later peaked at number one on the Hot Country Songs chart, staying there for two consecutive weeks. With that, Underwood became the first solo female artist to pull four number one's from one album since Twain did it with The Woman in Me. The album's fifth single, "I Told You So", a duet with the original singer of the song, Randy Travis, was released in February 2009. It peaked at number 2 on the Country charts and number 9 on the Billboard Hot 100. All singles from Carnival Ride were certified Platinum by the RIAA, for selling more than one million copies each. In January 2008, Underwood embarked on a joint tour with Keith Urban called the Love, Pain and the Whole Crazy Carnival Ride Tour, with dates fixed nationwide that continued through April. She then started her headlined tour, the Carnival Ride Tour, in February 2008, with dates across all North America, and ended it on December 14, 2008, playing to 1.2 million fans throughout the tour and being named the top-selling country female touring artist of 2008.

At the end of 2007, Underwood topped five Billboard Year-End charts, including Billboard 200 Artist of the Year and also Country Artist of the Year. Also in late 2007, she won three American Music Awards: Artist of the Year, Favorite Female Country Artist, and Favorite Country Album, for Some Hearts. At the 2008 Academy of Country Music Awards, she won Female Vocalist of the Year, for the 2nd consecutive time. She received two nominations for the 2008 Country Music Association Awards. Underwood and Brad Paisley co-hosted the awards show for their first year as hosts, and she walked away with the Female Vocalist of the Year award for the third consecutive year. At the ceremony, Underwood performed "Just a Dream" and was introduced by Leslie Ponder, the wife of a veteran who had died. At the 2008 American Music Awards, Carnival Ride won the Favorite Country Album award, marking her second consecutive win in the category.

In 2008, Underwood won her first international award, which was "Female Vocalist of the Year" at the European Country Music Association Awards. For the 44th Academy of Country Music Awards, in 2009, Underwood was nominated for four major awards. Underwood won for Female Vocalist of the Year and Entertainer of the Year, thus making her the first woman to win the award in ten years and the 7th female to take it in the award show's four-decade run. Underwood was nominated for Video of the Year at the 2009 CMT Awards for "Just A Dream". In 2009, at the 51st Grammy Awards, she won, for the third year in a row, the Grammy Award for Best Female Country Vocal Performance, for "Last Name", and performed the song at the ceremony. At the 52nd Grammy Awards in 2010, Underwood won her fifth Grammy Award: she won the Grammy Award for Best Country Collaboration with Vocals for "I Told You So" with Randy Travis and was also nominated again for Best Female Country Vocal Performance, for "Just A Dream". At the ceremony, she performed with Celine Dion, Usher, Smokey Robinson, and Jennifer Hudson during the 3-D Michael Jackson tribute. Grammy Awards producer Ken Ehrlich stated that Michael Jackson greatly admired Underwood, which is why she was hand-picked to perform during his tribute.

On March 15, 2008, Underwood was invited by Randy Travis to become a member of the Grand Ole Opry. On May 10, 2008, she was officially inducted by Garth Brooks into the Grand Ole Opry. On October 22, 2008, Underwood unveiled her wax figure at Madame Tussauds New York. In 2008, it was reported by Forbes that Underwood earned over $9 million between June 2007 and June 2008, being number 79 on the Top Celebrity 100 list. In 2009, Forbes reported that Underwood was the top earning American Idol alumnus from June 2008 to May 17, 2009. She earned more than twice as much as the second-place finisher, with estimated earnings of $14 million during this time period. She appeared on the holiday CD Hear Something Country Christmas 2007 with a rendition of "Do You Hear What I Hear?". The song reached number 2 on the AC Chart and remained there for three consecutive weeks. She recorded the song "Ever Ever After" for the soundtrack of the 2007 Walt Disney film Enchanted. Underwood co-wrote a song for Idol alum Kristy Lee Cook's major-label debut album Why Wait. At the 2008 Idol Gives Back, she sang George Michael's classic "Praying For Time" and later recorded it. In November 2008, Underwood recorded a virtual and posthumous duet with Elvis Presley, on his classic "I'll Be Home for Christmas", for his 2008 album Christmas Duets. Presley's ex-wife, Priscilla Presley, herself asked Underwood to do the duet: "Priscilla wanted me to do 'I'll Be Home for Christmas' ", she says. "I couldn't say 'no'." In March 2009, she tracked a cover of Mötley Crüe's ballad "Home Sweet Home" for the American Idol season eight farewell theme.

=== 2009–2012: Play On and collaborations ===
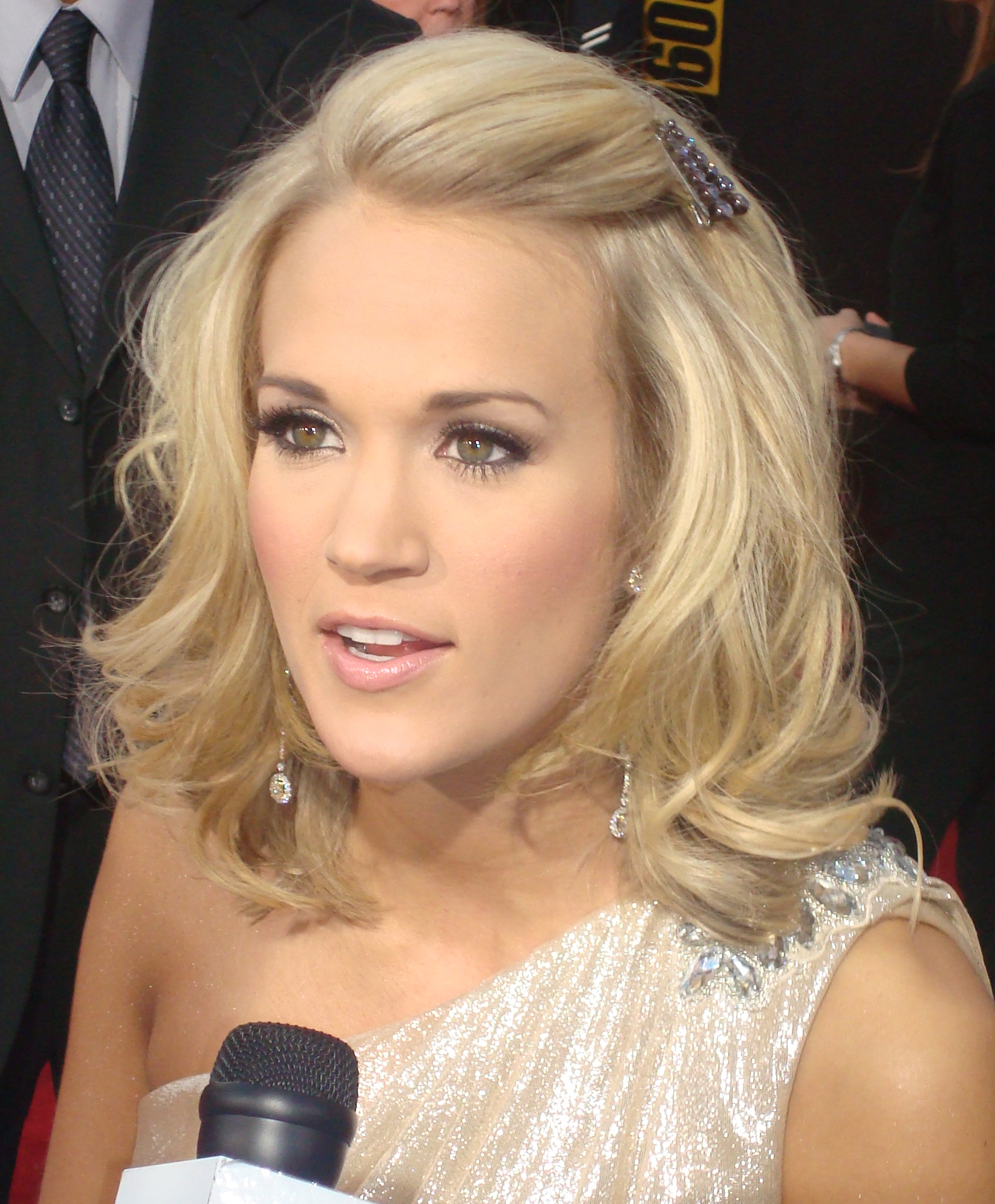
Underwood at the 2009 American Music Awards

Underwood released her third studio album, Play On, on November 3, 2009. The album debuted atop both the Billboard 200 and Top Country Albums, selling over 318,000 copies in its first week, and became, upon its release, the top-selling release of the year by a female artist, but was later overtaken by Susan Boyle's I Dreamed a Dream and finished the year as number two. Underwood wrote a song with pop/R&B singer-songwriter Ne-Yo for the album, the song, however, did not make the final tracklist. The first single from the album, "Cowboy Casanova", co-written by Underwood, Brett James and hip hop producer Mike Elizondo, was released in September 2009. It was a huge success, jumping from number 96 to number 11 on the Billboard Hot 100 in its second week, one of the biggest single-week upwards on the chart of all time. It later peaked at number one on the Hot Country Songs chart in just ten weeks, the year's fastest chart-topper by a country female and the fastest number one of her career at that time (her 2014 single "Something in the Water" topped the Hot Country Songs chart in its seventh week). "Cowboy Casanova" has sold over 4 million copies, being certified quadraple Platinum. The album's second single, "Temporary Home" hit number one on the Billboard Hot Country Songs and the RIAA certified it Platinum. "Undo It", Underwood's third single from Play On, was released to radio in May. It was later certified double Platinum and hit number one on the Hot Country Songs chart, giving Underwood her tenth number-one single on the Hot Country Songs. The fourth single from Play On, "Mama's Song", was released to country radio in September, peaking at number two on the Hot Country Songs and being certified Gold by the RIAA. The album is certified Triple Platinum.

Underwood's Play On Tour started its first leg on March 11, 2010, in Reading, Pennsylvania. The second leg of the tour started on September 25, 2010, in Portland, Oregon, and ended January 1, 2011, in Detroit. Underwood sold out the prestigious Hollywood Bowl on October 2, 2010. In December 2010, Pollstar.com ranked the Play On Tour one of the Top 50 tours of 2010, at number 1 on the North American ranking, and number 31 worldwide. Billboard also ranked Underwood's tour at number 24 for all worldwide tours of 2010. On January 4, 2011, official statistics revealed that Underwood played to over 1 million fans throughout the tour, resulting in her being named again as the top-ranked female country touring artist of the year.

At the 2009 CMA Awards, she received two nominations and co-hosted the ceremony with Brad Paisley for their second consecutive year. Underwood was nominated for six Academy of Country Music Awards. At the show's ceremony in April 2010, Underwood was named Entertainer of the Year, making her the first woman to win this award twice. Host Reba McEntire presented Underwood with the "ACM Triple Crown Award" signifying her winning Top New Artist, Top Female Vocalist, and Entertainer of the Year during her career. She was only the second female to win the coveted "Triple Crown Award", the first being Barbara Mandrell. At the CMT Music Awards, Underwood walked away with Video of the Year for "Cowboy Casanova" and also won CMT Performance of the Year for "Temporary Home" from CMT: Invitation Only presents Carrie Underwood. Underwood won two international awards at the 8th French Country Music Awards, which were Best Female Vocalist and Video of the Year, for "Cowboy Casanova". At the 2010 American Music Awards, she won "Favorite Country Album", for "Play On", making her the only artist in the American Music Award history to have all albums awarded in the category. She co-hosted the 2010 CMA Awards with Brad Paisley for the third year in a row. At the 2011 Grammy Awards, Underwood was nominated for 'Best Female Country Vocal Performance' for "Temporary Home". Underwood was honored by the CMT Artists of the Year special as one of the 5 top Artists of the year in 2010 in country music. The event aired on CMT on December 3, 2010. At the 2011 Academy of Country Music Awards, Underwood sang with Steven Tyler both her song "Undo It" and Aerosmith's "Walk This Way".

In May 2011, Underwood was one of the seven women to be honored by the Academy of Country Music at the Girls' Night Out: Superstar Women of Country special. She is the only female artist to win Entertainer of the Year twice. At the ceremony, Vince Gill introduced Underwood and presented her with the special award. He sang one of her hits, "Jesus, Take The Wheel", and joined Underwood on a rendition performance of "How Great Thou Art". The video of the performance turned into a viral sensation, reaching three million views on YouTube within two days.

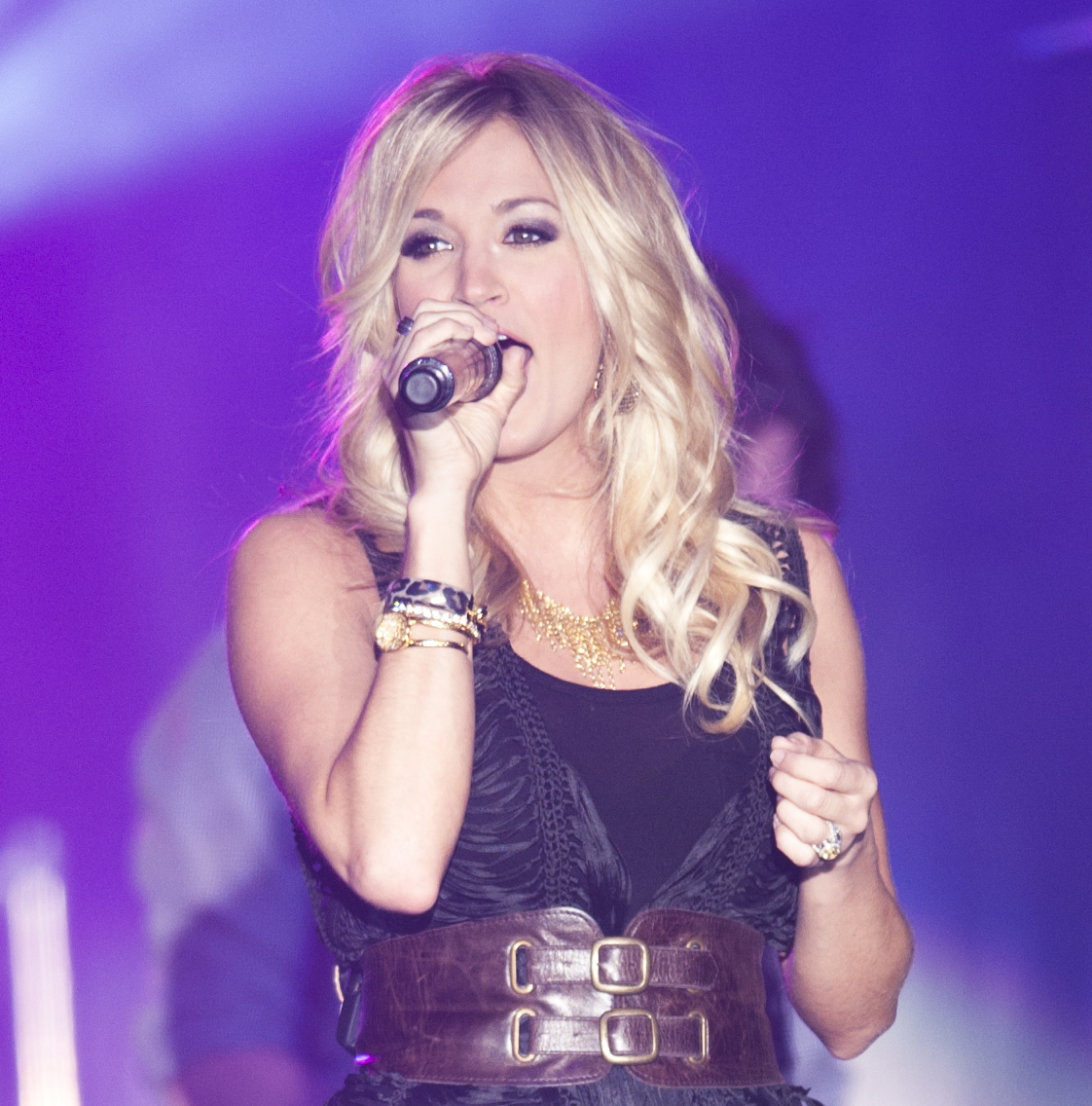
Underwood performing at the United States Naval Academy in April 2011

In December 2009, Some Hearts was named the number-one country album of the 2000s by Billboard, and Underwood was the top-ranked female artist on Billboard's Best Country Artists of the 2000 Decade list. Overall, she was ranked number 50 on the Artists of the Decade list by Billboard. Also in late 2009, Underwood had her very own CMT Invitation Only and also hosted a Christmas special, Carrie Underwood: An All-Star Holiday Special, a two-hour variety show on Fox that featured Dolly Parton (with whom she sang a rendition duet of "I Will Always Love You") season seven American Idol champion David Cook, Kristin Chenoweth, Brad Paisley and others. In May 2010, Underwood was selected on People magazine's 100 Most Beautiful People List for 2010. This was the 4th year in a row that she was selected for the list. Also in May, Victoria's Secret named her legs the Sexiest Legs in Hollywood. In June 2011, Rolling Stone magazine ranked Underwood as the number 11 Queen of Pop, based on a lot of criteria from 2009 until 2011. Underwood co-wrote and recorded a song titled "There's a Place for Us", the lead single from The Chronicles of Narnia: The Voyage of the Dawn Treader. Underwood and songwriters, David Hodges and Hillary Lindsey, received a nomination for the Golden Globe Award for Best Original Song. It was during this writing session that the trio also wrote "See You Again" for the movie; however, the song was not included in the film and Underwood kept it and pushed for its inclusion on her fourth album in 2012. In March 2011, Underwood sang John Lennon's "Instant Karma!" at the NBC's special All Together Now – A Celebration of Service, which honored former president George H. W. Bush. At the season ten finale of American Idol, Underwood selected a song for contestant Lauren Alaina to sing.

Underwood is featured on "Remind Me", a duet with Brad Paisley that reached number one on the Billboard Hot Country Songs, giving Underwood her eleventh number-one single on such chart and fourteenth overall. She has also a duet with Tony Bennett on his 2011 album Duets II and another duet with Randy Travis on his 2011 Anniversary Celebration album. Underwood was one of the headliners of the iHeartRadio Music Festival. The event took place on September 23 and 24, 2011.

On September 19, Underwood performed "You Really Got a Hold on Me" in tribute to Smokey Robinson, as he was presented with the Ella Award at the Society of Singers annual dinner. Robinson returned the favor to Underwood by singing "My Girl" to her. At the same event, they sang together with Stevie Wonder, Natalie Cole and other artists a medley of multiple songs. In 2010, Underwood was reported by Forbes to have earned over $13 million from May 2009 to May 2010, being the top-earning Idol. In July 2011, Forbes reported that Underwood earned over $20 million between May 2010 and May 2011, being the top-earning American Idol alumnus for the fourth consecutive year. She earned $5 million between 2011 and 2012.

On February 4, 2012, Underwood joined Steven Tyler to record CMT's Crossroads at the Pepsi Coliseum during the Pepsi Super Bowl Fan Jam of Super Bowl XLVI. It was the highest-rated episode in seven years. On February 12, 2012, Underwood and Tony Bennett performed their duet "It Had to Be You" at the 54th Annual Grammy Awards. They also sang the song on the season two premiere of Blue Bloods in September 2011.

=== 2012–2013: Blown Away and global tour ===
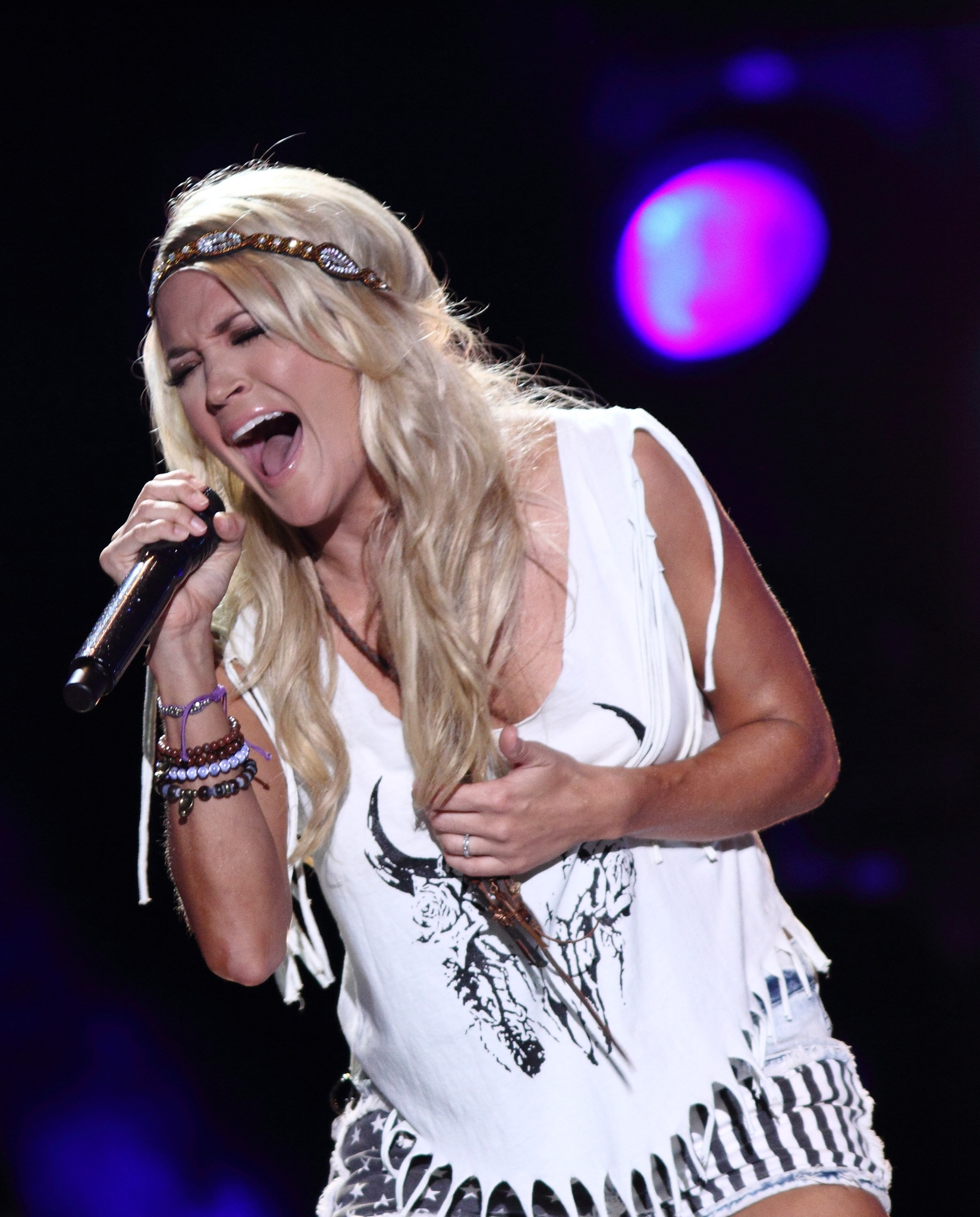
Underwood performing at the 2013 CMA Music Festival

Blown Away, Underwood's fourth album, was released on May 1, 2012. Underwood has said that this album features songs with a "darker storyline". "Blown Away" debuted at number 1 on the Billboard 200, the Country Albums Chart and the Digital Albums chart in the US, selling more than 267,000 in its first week. The first single, "Good Girl", was released on February 23, 2012. It was officially released to Country radio on February 27, 2012. The music video for "Good Girl" premiered on Entertainment Tonight and on VEVO on March 12, 2012. The song peaked at number one on the Hot Country Songs chart, giving Underwood her twelfth number-one on the chart, and was certified triple Platinum and has sold over three million copies. The song "Blown Away" was released as the second single from the album on July 9, 2012. It was a massive success, selling over 5 million copies, being certified five-times Platinum, reaching the top twenty of the Billboard Hot 100, the number-one spot on the Billboard Country Airplay and number two on the Top Country Songs, where it became Underwood's 16th top ten hit on Hot Country Songs chart, a record among women in the tally's 68-year history. The album was the 7th best-selling album of 2012, the second best-selling country album of the year and the second best-selling release by a female artist in 2012. It has been certified Triple Platinum by the RIAA and sold over 1.7 million copies in the United States alone. Underwood had her very own VH1 Unplugged (called "VH1 Presents: Carrie Underwood Unplugged") and VH1 Behind The Music episodes, which premiered October 2, 2012. For the episode, Underwood included a cover of the Coldplay song "Fix You".

"Two Black Cadillacs", the third single from the album, was released on November 26. It became Underwood's 17th top ten hit on the Billboard Hot Country Songs, extending her own record, later peaking at number two on Billboard's Country Airplay chart and was certified two-times Platinum. In March 2013, "See You Again" was released as the album's fourth single; it has peaked at number 2 on Country Airplay chart and has been certified two-times Platinum by the RIAA.

At the 2012 CMT Music Awards, Underwood won the awards for Video of the Year, for "Good Girl", and Collaborative Video of the Year, for "Remind Me", her duet with Brad Paisley. She also performed "Good Girl" at the ceremony. At the 2012 American Music Awards, she won the award for Favorite Album – Country, for Blown Away, and performed "Two Black Cadillacs". In early 2013, Underwood won the prize for Top Selling International Album of the Year at the 41st Country Music Awards of Australia. Also in February 2013, Underwood won her sixth Grammy Award, for Best Country Solo Performance, for "Blown Away". She performed a medley of "Blown Away" and "Two Black Cadillacs" at the awards show ceremony featuring an LED-powered dress. On February 13, Underwood received two nominations for the Academy of Country Music Awards. She won International Album of the Year at the 2013 British Country Music Awards. At the 2013 CMT Music Awards, Underwood won her 10th award, becoming the most awarded artist ever in CMT Music Awards history. She won Video of the Year for "Blown Away" for the fourth time, which also makes her the artist with the most wins ever in the category. During the ceremony, she paid tribute to tornado victims in Oklahoma, by performing "See You Again" backed by a choir from Nashville's Christ Church.

The first leg of the Blown Away Tour started at the Royal Albert Hall in London on June 21, 2012, which sold out in 90 minutes, and five shows in Australia, including a sold-out date at the Sydney Opera House, on July 2. The first leg of the Blown Away Tour made Underwood the best-selling female country touring artist of 2012, grossing over $29.2 million and bringing her career tour revenues to over $95 million. The tour had its own exhibition at the Country Music Hall of Fame, called "Carrie Underwood: The Blown Away Tour Exhibition", which ran from June 5 through November 10, 2013. The second leg of the tour started in February 2013, with shows in Ireland, an additional show in England, as part of the C2C: Country to Country festival, and several shows in North America. All dates of the second leg of the Blown Away Tour were sold out, breaking records. Underwood wrapped the Blown Away Tour in late May 2013, playing to one million fans across three continents and six countries. Her three headline arena tours have played to over 3.2 million fans combined. Underwood released The Blown Away Tour: LIVE, a DVD with nearly 100 minutes of performance footage, behind-the-scene looks, interviews, and music videos from the album Blown Away. The DVD was released on August 13, 2013, and is Underwood's first official DVD concert.

On February 22, 2013, Billboard ranked Underwood as the 16th money maker for the period from February 2012 to February 2013. She earned close to $12 million, being American Idol's Top Earner and second for female country artists. In June 2013, Forbes placed Underwood at number 46 on The Celebrity 100 list, reporting that she earned more than $31 million between June 2012 and June 2013, being the top-earning American Idol, and also being one of the ten highest-paid women in music of 2013.

On January 21, 2013, "Can't Stop Lovin' You", a song by rock band Aerosmith with featured vocals by Underwood, was released as a single. On May 25, Underwood joined the Rolling Stones onstage during the stop of the band's 50 and Counting Tour in Toronto, Canada. They performed "It's Only Rock 'n Roll (But I Like It)". On September 22, 2013, at the 65th Primetime Emmy Awards, she was part of the Emmy Awards' special tribute honoring the 50th Anniversary of 1963 Television Milestones, which includes the assassination coverage of President John F. Kennedy and The Beatles' first US appearance. She performed one of The Beatles' iconic songs, "Yesterday".

=== 2014–2015: Greatest Hits: Decade #1 ===
Underwood confirmed that she began planning a new album in August 2013 and would start prep work sometime in 2014. Underwood told Billboard, "After The Sound of Music, I feel like I can really buckle down and start working on the next album." Underwood also stated she has been planning another tour, which might be toned down from her earlier ones, stating, "I haven't thought about it much because I don't know what the next album is going to sound like, but I like just standing there and singing, too. I may take a different approach, a more simple approach on the next one. I loved the energy that rock concerts had", Underwood told Billboard. Underwood was featured on "Somethin' Bad" from Miranda Lambert's album Platinum. Released as a single, "Somethin' Bad" reached number one on the Hot Country Songs chart, becoming Underwood's 13th number-one on the chart. The same week, the song vaulted to number 19 on the Billboard Hot 100.

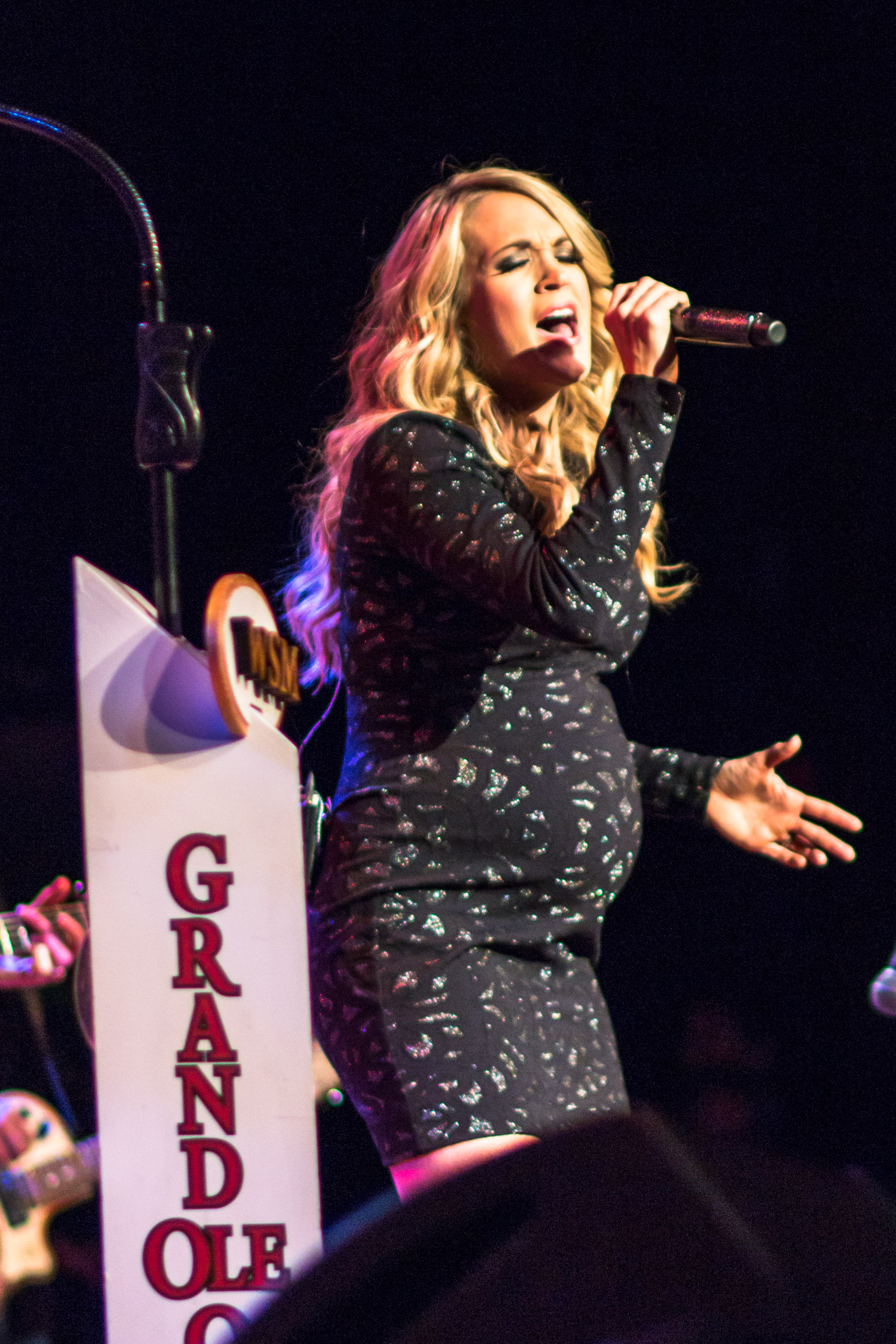
Underwood performing at the Grand Ole Opry in December 2014

In early 2014, she performed on the Rock and Roll Hall of Fame Induction Ceremony, paying tribute to Linda Ronstadt. Her performances were highly acclaimed by critics and even by Stevie Nicks, who performed with Underwood. In September, Underwood headlined the 2014 Global Citizen Festival, alongside Jay-Z, No Doubt and other music acts. Her cover of R.E.M.'s "Everybody Hurts" during her performance was highly praised. She headlined the 2014 Concert for Valor in November, alongside Eminem, Metallica, Foo Fighters, and other music acts, where she was backed by the Singing Sergeants of the US Air Force during the performance of "Something in the Water". Underwood was asked by Bono himself to front U2's World AIDS Day (RED) Concert, alongside U2, Bruce Springsteen, Coldplay's Chris Martin, and Kanye West, on December 1, 2014. She was joined on stage by U2 guitarist The Edge during a performance of her song "Change", which received acclaim.

The Academy of Country Music awarded Underwood the Gene Weed Special Achievement Award, for her widespread exposure through NFL Sunday Night Football, the live NBC broadcast of The Sound of Music Live!, her worldwide Blown Away Tour and her charity work with the American Red Cross and her C.A.T.S. Foundation. At the 2014 Billboard Music Awards, Underwood won the Milestone Award, for which she had been nominated due to her chart success, especially her record of having the best starting run ever by a woman on the Country Airplay chart (18 top ten hits on the chart). Time listed Underwood as one of the 100 most influential people in the world, placing her in the "Icons" category. She won the award for Favorite Female Country Artist at the American Music Awards, marking her eighth career AMA. She was named 2014's top female Christian artist by Billboard. In 2015 at the 57th Grammy Awards, Underwood won Best Country Solo Performance for "Something in the Water", marking her seventh career Grammy Award. At the 2015 Billboard Music Awards, she won the award for Top Christian Song for "Something in the Water". At the 2015 CMT Music Awards, Underwood won three awards, including Video of the Year for "Something in the Water". She won her ninth American Music Award in 2015, winning Favorite Female Country Artist.

Underwood's first greatest hits compilation, Greatest Hits: Decade#1, was released on December 9. The album's lead single, "Something in the Water", became a crossover success. It reached number one on the Hot Country Songs chart, becoming her fourteenth number-one hit on that chart and her second in 2014. With fourteen number ones, she holds the record as the female country artist with the most number-one hits on the Hot Country Songs chart in the Nielsen SoundScan era (since 1991) in the Guinness Book. The song topped the Hot Christian Songs chart and has held the top spot for multiple consecutive weeks. It debuted at number 24 on the Hot 100 chart as well. The song set and broke multiple airplay records on Country radio in its first week. In February 2015, "Little Toy Guns" was released as the second single from the compilation. The track peaked at number 6 on Billboard's Hot Country Songs, number 2 on the Country Airplay Chart and number 47 on the Hot 100. The song was nominated for Best Country Solo Performance at the 58th Grammy Awards. The compilation debuted with the biggest sales debut for a hits collection in any genre of music in more than six years and the biggest first-week sales for a female hits album in any genre in over nine years. She earned $10 million between 2013 and 2014, topping Forbes' list of the top-earning American Idols, and $8 million between 2014 and 2015.

=== 2015–2017: Storyteller, label change, and injury ===
Underwood returned to the studio to finish her fifth studio album in the spring of 2015. Storyteller was released on October 23, 2015, and the lead single, "Smoke Break" was released to radio in August. Storyteller debuted at number 2 on the Billboard 200, making Underwood the first country artist to have their first five studio albums debut in the top two slots on the Billboard 200. In addition, the album debuted at number one on the Top Country Albums chart, earning Underwood another record as the first artist to score six consecutive number-one albums on that chart. Storyteller has since been certified Platinum by the RIAA.

The album's second single, "Heartbeat", became Underwood's 14th leader on the Country Airplay while the album's third single, "Church Bells", became her 15th career number one on the Country Airplay chart, both extending her record for the most number one's among women in the history of the chart. Underwood became the first female artist to score two number one hits on the Country Airplay chart in 2016. A fourth single, "Dirty Laundry", was released from the album in August 2016, eventually peaking at number two on the Billboard Country Airplay. Billboard ranked Underwood as the top female country artist for the year, and fifth overall.

Underwood launched the Storyteller Tour, her fifth headlining tour, in January 2016, with a second half picking up in August. The tour played to over 1 million fans, completing 92 shows across 7 countries while being named by Billboard the top country tour for the first half of the year. She earned $26 million between 2015 and 2016, ranking among Forbes' list of highest-paid country music acts, and $20 million between 2016 and 2017, ranking on Billboard's Top 50 Money Makers list.

In June 2016, Underwood received three nominations from the CMT Music Awards, taking home two honors for "Smoke Break", expanding her CMT Music Award total to 15—the most among all acts. She was named Female Vocalist of the Year by the American Country Countdown Awards in 2016, and also received the CMA Chairman's Award. In July, she picked up her fifth Teen Choice Award, for Choice Country Artist. Underwood also received two nominations from the Billboard Music Awards, including Top Country Artist. In September 2016, Underwood was the first artist to receive the ACM Lifting Lives Gary Haber Award, for her continuous work with charities.

On October 20, 2016, Underwood was honored as one of CMT Artists of the Year, marking her third year to receive the award. Underwood received four nominations for the 50th Annual Country Music Association Awards, including her first nomination for Entertainer of the Year. She walked away with Female Vocalist of the Year, her fourth time to win the award. She further received three nominations for the 2016 American Music Awards, including the top prize for Artist of the Year. She won Favorite Female Country Artist for the fourth time and Favorite Country Album (for Storyteller) for the fifth time, expanding her record as the only artist to win the award for all albums released.

Underwood was one of 30 artists to perform on "Forever Country", a mash-up track of "Take Me Home, Country Roads", "On the Road Again", and "I Will Always Love You" celebrating 50 years of the CMA Awards. The single debuted at number one on Billboard's Hot Country Songs. In December 2016, she joined Keith Urban for a series of concerts in Australia and New Zealand.

In January 2017, she received her ninth People's Choice award, winning Favorite Female Country Artist. Underwood received one nomination – Best Country Solo Performance – for her single "Church Bells" for the 59th Annual Grammy Awards. She and Keith Urban performed their new single, "The Fighter", at the Grammy ceremony. Their joint single peaked in the top two of the Hot Country Songs and top twenty of the adult contemporary chart and was certified platinum by the RIAA.

She received two nominations for the 52nd annual Academy of Country Music Awards, including Entertainer of the Year. She scored three more nominations for the 2017 CMT Music Awards in June, including Video of the Year for "Church Bells". She won Female Video of the year, extending her record for most wins in the show's history. Underwood scored two nominations for the 2017 Teen Choice awards, including Choice Country Artist, which she won for a third consecutive year. She received one nomination from the 45th annual American Music Awards in the Favorite Female Artist – Country category, which she won for the fourth year in a row, bringing her total to twelve American Music awards.

In January 2017, Underwood took time off at the beginning of the year to spend time with family, and would then, possibly, begin to write for her next album. In March 2017, Underwood signed with Universal Music Group's Capitol Records Nashville after being with Arista Nashville for nearly twelve years. Madame Tussauds unveiled a new figure of Underwood when the Nashville location opened in April 2017. Matthew West collaborated with Underwood, who performed background vocals on the song "Something Greater" from his album, All In (2017). Underwood and Brad Paisley hosted the CMA Awards in November, marking their 10th consecutive year as hosts. Underwood again received a nomination in the Female Vocalist category, her twelfth nomination to date. She performed "Softly and Tenderly" as part of a tribute to the victims of the 2017 Las Vegas shooting, and the performance received widespread acclaim.

Underwood released her second concert experience, The Storyteller Tour: Live from Madison Square Garden, on November 17. A few days after the 51st Annual Country Music Association Awards, Underwood sustained injuries in a fall at home that resulted in a broken wrist and several facial stitches. Underwood did not make any public appearances for several months following the incident.

=== 2018–2019: Cry Pretty ===
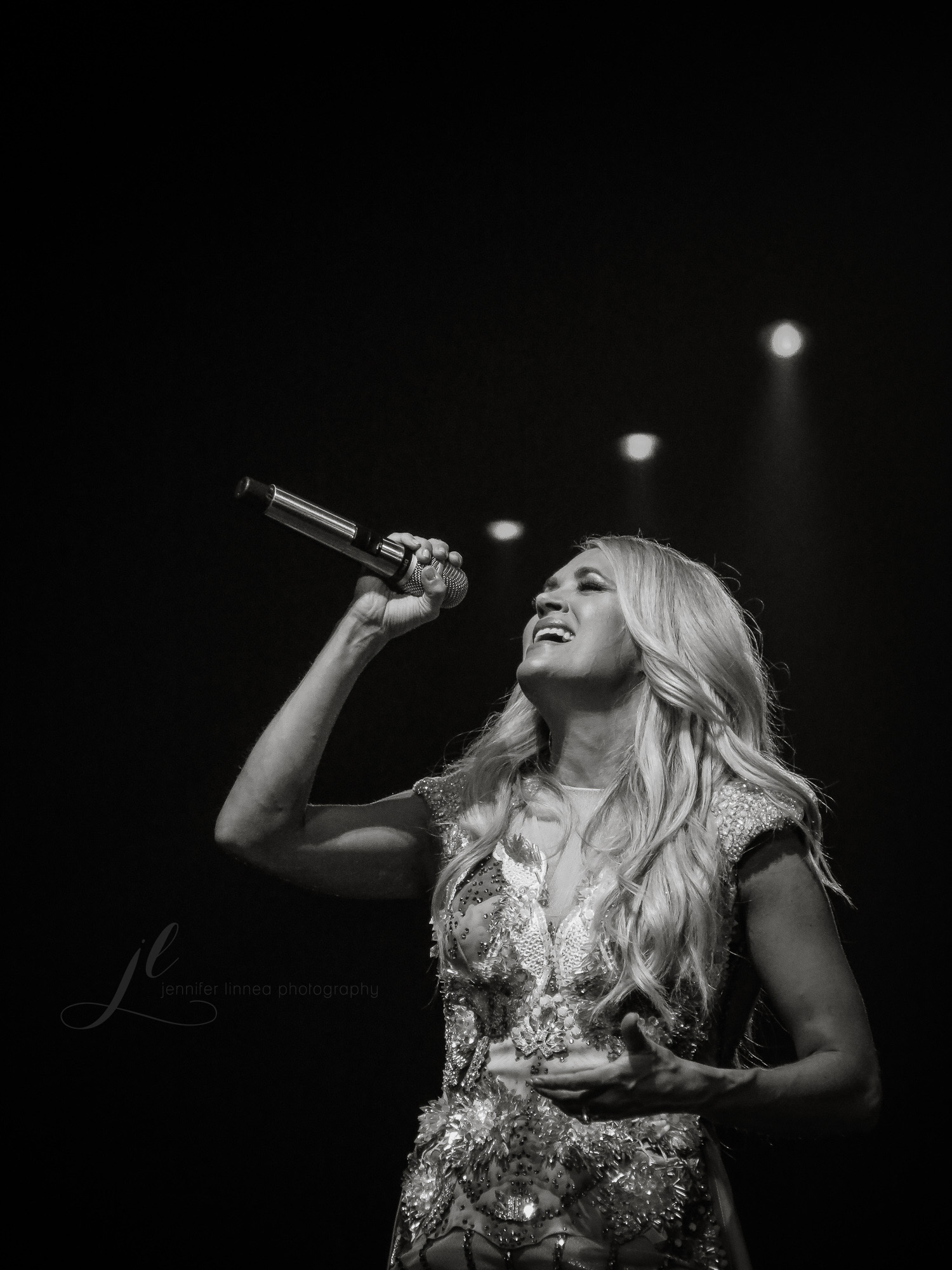
Underwood performs on the Cry Pretty Tour, September 2019

In January 2018, Underwood released "The Champion", a promotional duet single featuring Ludacris for Super Bowl LII. "The Champion" is Underwood's first under the pop genre. The song debuted at number 47 on the Billboard Hot 100 chart, powered by its launch at number 3 on the Digital Song Sales chart with 61,000 downloads. Underwood met songwriter/producer David Garcia in 2017, with whom she began co-producing her new album. Underwood returned to the stage for the first time since her accident and debuted her new single "Cry Pretty" at the 53rd Annual ACM Awards on April 15, where she received two nominations; she won the award for Vocal Event of the Year for "The Fighter" with Keith Urban. On May 11, she celebrated a decade of being an Opry member. On May 13, Underwood returned to American Idol, now rebooted on ABC, to mentor the top five of the season sixteen contestants. She performed "Cry Pretty", in addition to "See You Again" with the remaining top five contestants.

On May 8, Underwood received four nominations and one win for the 2018 CMT Music Awards. She performed "Cry Pretty" at the ceremony in June and expanded her record as the artist with the most wins in the show's history. She received a nomination for Choice Country Artist and "Cry Pretty" received a nomination for Choice Country Song for the Teen Choice awards, winning Choice Country Artist and expanding her record for most wins in the category. On June 22, Underwood was honored with the Hero award from the Radio Disney Music Awards, in recognition of her humanitarian efforts. She and Ludacris performed "The Champion" together at the awards ceremony.

Her sixth studio album, Cry Pretty, was released on September 14, 2018. The same week, the album's second single was confirmed to be "Love Wins", with the music video debuting on September 11. Cry Pretty debuted at number 1 on the Billboard 200, setting several records upon arrival. Underwood is the first woman to hit the top of the Billboard 200 chart with four country albums. Cry Pretty's debut frame of 266,000 units is the biggest week for any album by a woman and a country album in 2018. This was Underwood's seventh consecutive album to debut at number one on the Top Country Albums chart. Cry Pretty's debut week also marked the most first week streams by any female in country music at that time. The album finished 2018 as the best-selling solo female album and the seventh best-selling album overall, with over 401,000 copies sold. In February 2020, the album was certified Platinum.

Underwood performed "Spinning Bottles", a song from the album, at the 46th annual American Music Awards on October 9, also winning one award for Favorite Female Country Artist. Brad Paisley and Underwood hosted the 52nd Annual Country Music Association Awards on November 14, 2018, where she picked up her fifth win as the CMA's Female Vocalist of the Year. The same month, Underwood announced she would kick off the Cry Pretty Tour 360 in May 2019. As well as five other dates in United Kingdom arenas, it was announced that the leg of the tour would include a performance at the Glastonbury Festival.

Underwood received one nomination – Female Artist of the Year – for the 54th Academy of Country Music Awards taking place April 7. She performed with Chrissy Metz, Lauren Alaina, Mickey Guyton, and Maddie & Tae. She gave the debut performance of "Southbound", the official third single from the Cry Pretty album, during the show. Underwood further received two more nominations for the Billboard Music Awards, including Top Country Album for Cry Pretty and Top Female Country Artist, winning the latter, bringing her total career wins to 11. For the 2019 CMT Music Awards, Underwood's video for "Cry Pretty" received a nomination for Video of the Year and "Love Wins" received a nomination for Female Video of the Year, with the awards airing live June 5. Underwood performed "Southbound" at Centennial Park during the show's broadcast; the performance was free and open to the public. "Cry Pretty" won Video of the Year and "Love Wins" won Female Video, extending Underwood's lead as the most awarded artist in the show's history, and giving her a total of 20 CMT awards. On June 8, the official music video for "Southbound" premiered on Underwood's YouTube channel.

On May 19, 2019, she returned to American Idol to perform "Southbound" during the season's finale episode. On June 7, Underwood headlined the second day of CMA Music Fest in Nashville, where Joan Jett made a surprise appearance on stage. In July 2019, she performed at the Glastonbury Festival, as part of her Cry Pretty 360 Tour. Underwood co-hosted the 53rd Annual Country Music Association Awards for her twelfth year, this time with Dolly Parton and Reba McEntire. She received her second nomination for Entertainer of the Year and debuted "Drinking Alone", the final single from the Cry Pretty album. Following the ceremony, Underwood announced she would be stepping down as co-host for the awards. On November 24, Underwood picked up two more American Music Awards, extending her record as the most-awarded artist in the Favorite Album – Country category with Cry Pretty. In December 2019, Underwood was one of several artists who attended the Kennedy Center Honors; she paid tribute to recipient Linda Ronstadt by performing two of her songs.

=== 2020–2021: Find Your Path, My Gift, and My Savior ===
Underwood released her debut book, Find Your Path, on March 3, 2020, went on a book tour, and appeared on television shows, including Rachael Ray. She received two nominations for the 55th Academy of Country Music Awards; Entertainer of the Year and Female Artist of the Year. She later won the award for Entertainer of the Year; the win made her the most-awarded woman in that category. Underwood tied with Thomas Rhett, making it the first time in history two artists would share the award. For the 54th Annual Country Music Association Awards, Underwood received two nominations, including Entertainer of the Year, her third year being nominated in the category. Underwood extended her own record for most wins in CMT Music Awards history; the video for "Drinking Alone" earned two awards including Video of the Year when the ceremony aired live on October 21. In August 2020, Underwood hosted her own Apple Radio Show, entitled XO Radio.

Her first Christmas album, My Gift, was released on September 25, 2020. It was her record-setting eighth consecutive career-opening number-one album on the Billboard Top Country Albums chart, also debuting at number-one on the Top Christian Albums and Top Holiday Albums, and at number 8 on the Billboard 200. The album later peaked at number 5 on the Billboard 200. On December 3, 2020, Underwood starred in and executive produced a holiday special airing on HBO Max, performing all of the songs from My Gift. The album earned Underwood two number one songs atop the Hot Christian Songs chart and was the top-selling new Christmas album of the year. On September 24, 2021, a special edition of the album was released, containing three additional tracks, including a version of "Favorite Time of Year".

On March 26, Underwood released My Savior, a gospel cover album.My Savior debuted at number one on both of Billboard's Top Country Albums and Top Christian Albums charts, and number 4 on the Billboard 200, marking her record-setting ninth consecutive number one. Underwood performed a virtual concert on Easter Sunday from the Ryman Auditorium, with over $100,000 raised for the charity Save the Children. In December 2020, Spanish singer David Bisbal released his duet with Underwood, "Tears of Gold", featuring a music video that was filmed in Los Angeles. At the Latin American Music Awards of 2021 on April 15, Underwood joined Bisbal for the debut televised performance of the song in Sunrise, Florida; the pair were nominated for Favorite Video of the Year.

At the 56th Academy of Country Music Awards, Underwood received one nomination for Video of the Year, "Hallelujah" featuring John Legend; she performed a medley of songs from My Savior, with a guest appearance by CeCe Winans. The video for "Hallelujah" also received two nominations and one win at the 2021 CMT Music Awards. Underwood received four nominations at the 2021 Billboard Music Awards, and one win, Top Christian Album, for My Gift. Needtobreathe released "I Wanna Remember", a duet track with Underwood, and its music video in May. They gave the debut performance of the song at the CMT Music Awards in June. Underwood's Las Vegas residency, Reflection, launched in December 2021, in collaboration with Resorts World Las Vegas. Due to high demand, Underwood added six more shows, extending the residency through April 2022.

Underwood collaborated with Dan + Shay on a cover of "Only Us" for the soundtrack album of the 2021 film adaptation of Dear Evan Hansen that was released as a single on September 3, 2021. She also appeared on the duet single "If I Didn't Love You", with Jason Aldean, the third collaboration of the year for Underwood. The single spent two weeks at number one atop the Billboard's Country Airplay chart. The pair debuted the live televised performance of the song at the 55th Annual Country Music Association Awards, where Underwood received a nomination for Entertainer of the Year. On November 21, Underwood scored two more wins at the American Music Awards of 2021, making her one of the most-awarded artists in the show's history. She and Aldean again performed their duet at the ceremony. In July, Underwood was the closing headliner at Nashville's CMA Summer Jam, which included a performance with Dwight Yoakam, with the event airing in September in place of the canceled CMA Music Fest.

In November, Underwood released "Stretchy Pants", a comedic holiday single benefitting the Nashville-based organization, The Store, which provides free shopping for qualifying families. She was a headliner for CMA Country Christmas airing on November 29. On November 25, she performed "Favorite Time of Year" live from Nashville, Tennessee, as part of Macy's Thanksgiving Day Parade. On December 1, Underwood was one of several performers for the annual Rockefeller Center Christmas Tree lighting ceremony. She performed two songs, including "Let There Be Peace" from the My Gift album. Underwood received two Grammy nominations for the 64th Annual Grammy Awards, winning one for Best Gospel Album for My Savior when they aired in April 2022.

On March 7, Underwood won one ACM award, Single of the Year, for her collaboration with Jason Aldean, "If I Didn't Love You", also joining him to perform the song.

=== 2022–present: Denim & Rhinestones ===
On March 18, 2022, Underwood released the single, "Ghost Story"; the song served as lead single from Underwood's ninth studio album, Denim & Rhinestones, which was released on June 10, 2022. The single peaked within the top ten on the Country Airplay. On April 3, 2022, Underwood won the Grammy Award for Best Roots Gospel Album. When speaking to the press a tearful Underwood expressed "I feel it's one of the most important bodies of work I've wanted to do literally my whole career, and I got to." She gave the debut performance of "Ghost Story" at the ceremony. At the 2022 CMT Music Awards, Underwood won in two categories, including Video of the Year, for "If I Didn't Love You" with Jason Aldean, continuing her run as the most-awarded artist in the show's history. She also gave the second live performance of "Ghost Story", while being suspended several feet above the stage. On April 30, Underwood headlined at Stagecoach Festival and performed with Axl Rose. She went on Denim & Rhinestones Tour with opening guest Jimmie Allen.

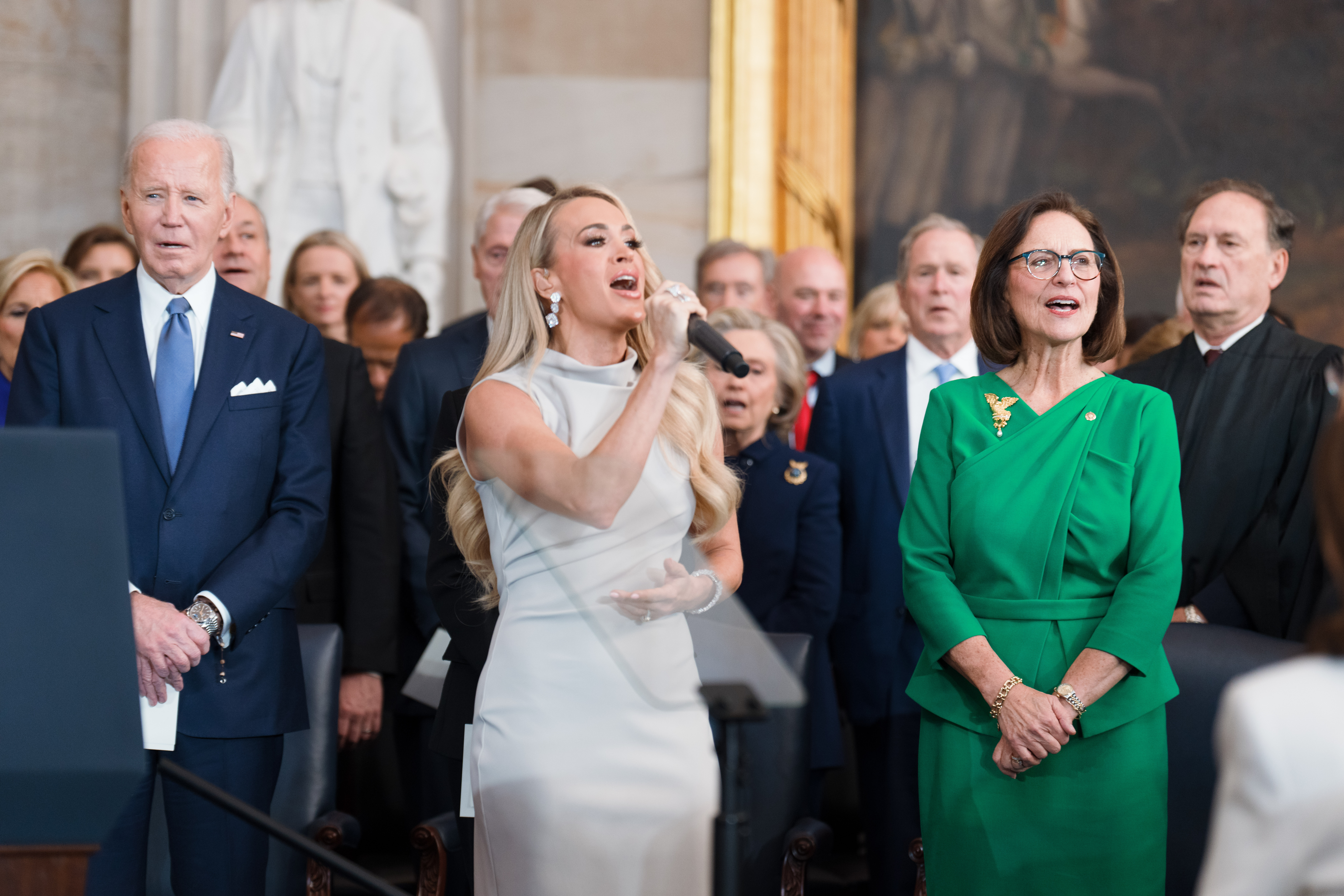
Underwood performing "America the Beautiful" at U.S. President Donald Trump's second inauguration in January 2025

Underwood was scheduled to perform on the twentieth season finale of American Idol on May 22; however, she was forced to cancel the appearance due to COVID-19 exposure within the band. On June 11, she headlined for day three of CMA Music Fest. Denim & Rhinestones opened at number ten on Billboard's Top Album Sales chart, moving 31,000 units and marking Underwood's tenth consecutive top ten album. It debuted at number two on Billboard's Top Country Albums, marking ten top three albums from her career. At the end of June, Underwood made a surprise appearance at a Guns N' Roses concert in London, where she had been promoting her album. On July 15, Apple Music released a Sessions EP featuring Underwood performing three songs, including "Ghost Story", "Blown Away" and "Mama, I'm Coming Home"; Underwood stated, "I have always been an Ozzy Osbourne fan and 'Mama, I'm Coming Home' is one of my all-time favorite songs." On July 30, Underwood took part in a tribute show for Barbara Mandrell, performing "I Was Country When Country Wasn't Cool".

Underwood received three nominations for the Country Music Association Awards, including Entertainer of the Year, airing November 9, 2022. On September 16, Underwood joined several artists to honor Vince Gill for a CMT Giants 90 minute special. The second single from the album, "Hate My Heart", was released to radio on October 31. The music video premiered November 2. She received two nominations for the American Music Awards of 2022, that aired on November 20. She won the award for The Country Artist at the 48th People's Choice Awards, which aired December 6. On March 10, 2023, Underwood released a new single, "Out of That Truck". The single was sent to country radio in June. Underwood received two nominations and was announced to perform for the CMT Music Awards, airing April 2. When Guns N' Roses announced their 2023 North American tour, Underwood was announced as the opening act for three dates, including one show in Nashville.

On June 7, Underwood shared a snippet of a new song, "Take Me Out", included on the deluxe edition of the Denim & Rhinestones album, which was released in September. On June 9, Underwood launched her own SiriusXM channel, Carrie's Country, which features multiple genres, including classic rock and the latest in country, as well as personal insight from Underwood on her career. She added 18 more dates for her Vegas residency, Reflection, through August 2024. In July 2024, it was announced she had extended her residency, and would replace Katy Perry as judge on American Idol in 2025, respectively.

On August 2, Underwood released a duet with American rock band Papa Roach, "Leave a Light On (Talk Away the Dark)", that was originally featured on their album Ego Trip. The charity single was released in collaboration with the American Foundation for Suicide Prevention for suicide awareness. Underwood was featured on the duet "I'm Gonna Love You" with Cody Johnson, released to country radio in September 2024. The single opened at number one on Billboard's Digital Songs sales chart and peaked within the top ten of both Billboard’s Country Airplay and Hot Country Songs.

In January 2025, Underwood performed "America the Beautiful" at the second inauguration of U.S. President Donald Trump. She performed a cappella, following complications with the planned musical accompaniment. ABC News affiliate KABC-TV called the performance a "unifying moment". Following "intense backlash" from fans and mixed reaction from media, Underwood called her decision to perform at the inauguration an answer to a call "at a time when we must all come together in the spirit of unity and looking to the future." In August of that year, it was announced that Underwood would return as a judge on American Idol for another season.

On 12 May 2026, Underwood returned to American Idol to perform truncated versions of Mötley Crüe's "Home Sweet Home" and "Kickstart My Heart" with the band on the show's finale. It was not her first connection to the song; Underwood had previously recorded a cover of "Home Sweet Home" as American Idol's end-title theme in 2009. The performance continued a pattern of rock covers throughout her career, including Guns N' Roses' "Welcome to the Jungle," Motörhead's "Ace of Spades," and Ozzy Osbourne's "Mama, I'm Coming Home" in concert, and a 2025 duet with an American Idol contestant covering Drowning Pool's "Bodies."

== Artistry ==
=== Voice ===
Underwood has been highly acclaimed for her vocals. David Wild of Rolling Stone has praised her voice, saying that "she can hit any note". Her vocal range has been described as "enormous", with critics highlighting her ability to hold notes for an extended period of time. Billboard describes her vocal ability as "freakish". Concert critics have pointed out that "she'll let loose with an improbably long note that runs through more octaves than you knew existed". When asked if it ever becomes difficult to belt at such high intensity during her 90–120 minute live shows, Underwood responded, "I'm too proud to drop keys. I won't do it. Maybe the older I get, I'll write some songs in lower keys so it'll be easier. I've always been pretty good as far as stamina onstage. Being able to work out and stay physically strong is important ... So far, it's worked for me. I'm just blessed at being able to be loud for long periods of time." Her voice has also been praised as "versatile". She has performed live versions of gospel songs like "How Great Thou Art", in which Yahoo! critics noticed her ability to move an audience with a "powerful performance", and rock songs like Guns N' Roses' "Paradise City", with Rolling Stone critics saying it was a "standout performance", adding that "when the song reached its crescendo, the singer went right over the edge with it, twirling like a tornado and tossing in more than a few banshee wails" and even saying "if the original members of Guns N' Roses ever wanted to reunite without Axl Rose, they might be wise to ask Carrie Underwood to fill his bandana". In 2023, Rolling Stone ranked Underwood at number 158 on its list of the 200 Greatest Singers of All Time.

=== Influences ===
Underwood has credited "music as a whole" as her major influence, since she "grew up listening to music" and "there were songs, different kind of songs coming at me from everywhere". She has mentioned pop and rock acts like Queen, Guns N' Roses, George Michael, the Rolling Stones, My Chemical Romance and Papa Roach as influences. In a 2014 interview Underwood spoke on the late Queen frontman, "I've always been a huge fan and lover of Freddie Mercury. I would listen to him when I was a kid. He could do so many amazing things with his voice. People like that — who had incredible voices — I was always drawn to." In July 2022 she joined Guns N' Roses on stage during their concert at Tottenham Hotspur Stadium in London where she performed with another of her idols, band frontman Axl Rose, saying after, "I've covered enough Guns N' Roses stuff, and it was people like him who taught me how to sing". During the audition phase of American Idol in 2025, a contestant sang nu metal songs such as Korn's "Freak on a Leash" and Drowning Pool's "Bodies". Underwood expressed her excitement and revealed that she listened to a lot of nu metal while in high school.

Among country artists, she has listed George Strait, Dolly Parton, Randy Travis, Martina McBride, Reba McEntire, and Garth Brooks as influences. Although never publicly mentioning Faith Hill and Shania Twain as musical influences, critics have linked Underwood's musical style to those of Hill and Twain. Her music is generally country and country pop with a rock influence that resembles Kelly Clarkson, as noticed by Rolling Stone. She has also released songs with a Christian music influence.

== Legacy ==
Since her debut in 2005, Underwood has been praised by both veteran artists and music critics. In 2014, Rolling Stone described Underwood as "the female vocalist of her generation of any genre", while a 2012 issue of Billboard magazine referred to her as Country Music's reigning Queen.

Time featured her in its 2014 list of the 100 most influential people in the world, in which Brad Paisley wrote "not only has she earned her place, she's also raised the bar: she's a prolific songwriter, a trendsetter and an Opry member"; Paisley further called her "the best singer in any format of music." In 2015, Grady Smith of The Guardian praised her, saying "Carrie Underwood has emerged as the leader of country music". Vince Gill has also stated: "The possibility of Carrie's longevity is through the roof. There are fine singers, and there are gifted, great singers, and she's one of those. Her vocal skills are off the hook". She has further received public commendation from Stevie Nicks, Melissa Etheridge, Steven Tyler, Tony Bennett, Dolly Parton, and Loretta Lynn. David Wild of Rolling Stone has stated that "Carrie Underwood is the greatest thing that American Idol ever gave us". She was inducted into the Oklahoma Hall of Fame in 2017, and the Hollywood Walk of Fame in 2018, for her achievements in music.

Underwood has influenced pop girl group Fifth Harmony, singer Mollie King of British pop girl group the Saturdays, singer Kelsea Ballerini, The Voice winner Danielle Bradbery, American Idol runner-up Lauren Alaina, and singer and actress Lucy Hale.

== Achievements ==
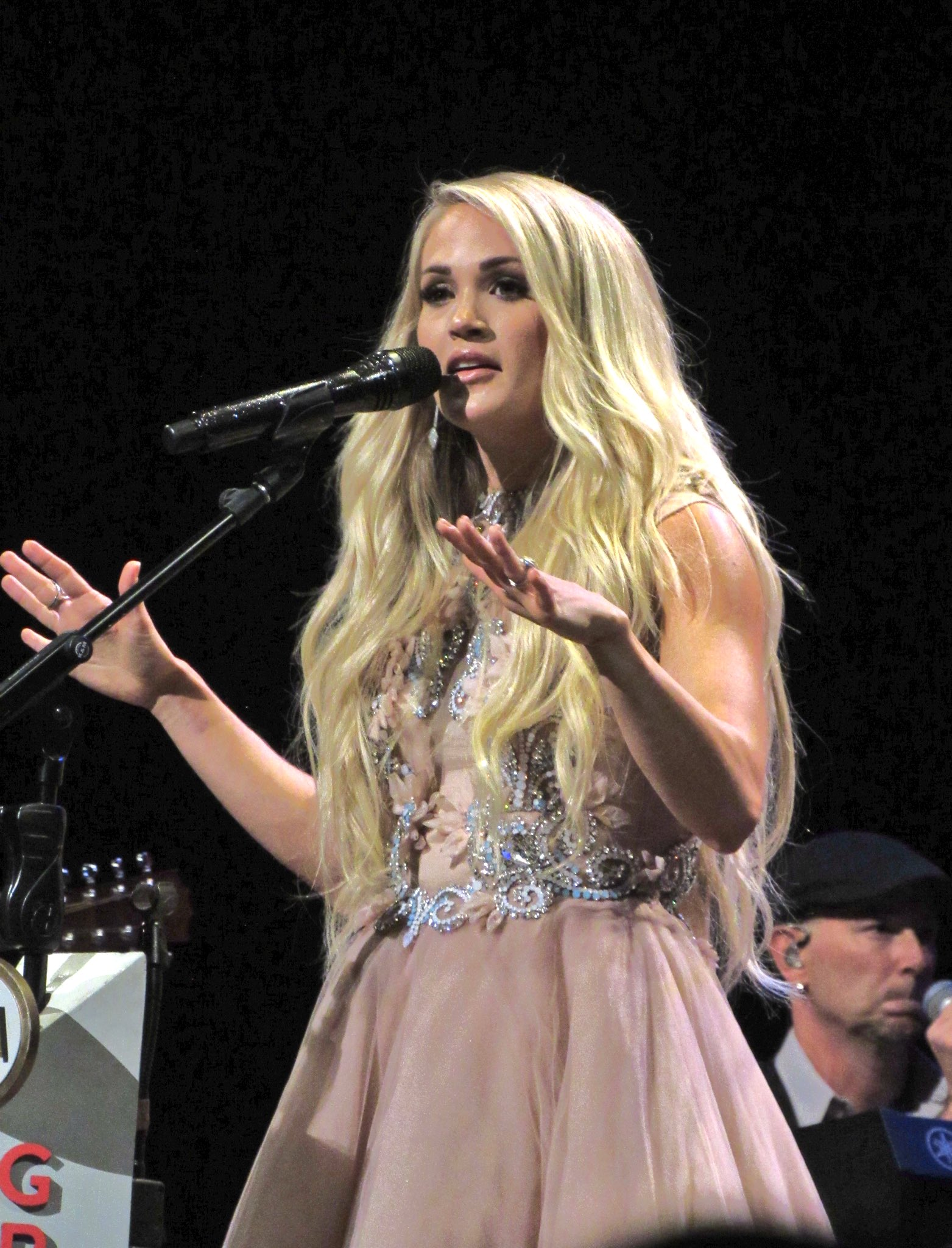
Underwood celebrating her ten-year anniversary of becoming a member of the Grand Ole Opry in 2018

The most awarded country artist of all time, Underwood has been the recipient of eight Grammy Awards, twelve Billboard Music Awards, sixteen Academy of Country Music Awards, seventeen American Music Awards, nine Country Music Association Awards, seven Teen Choice Awards, five CMT Artists of the Year awards, and twenty-three CMT Music Awards, among others. As a songwriter, she has also received a Golden Globe Award nomination and won ten BMI Awards. Underwood was inducted into the Grand Ole Opry in 2008, for her many accomplishments in country music, and into the Oklahoma Music Hall of Fame in 2009. She was inducted into the Oklahoma Hall of Fame in 2017, the highest honor one can receive from the state. In September 2020, Underwood won her third Entertainer of the year award from the Academy of Country Music, making her the first woman in history to do so.

In December 2009, she was awarded the Harmony Award from the Nashville Symphony Orchestra for her achievements in music across many genres. In 2013, she received the Artist Achievement Award at the 38th Annual New York Honors Gala held by the T.J. Martell Foundation. In 2014, she was honored by the Country Radio Broadcasters' Board of Directors with the CRB Artist Humanitarian Award at the 2014 Country Radio Seminar.

She is regarded as one of the most successful artists in any musical genre. The Recording Industry Association of America recognizes Underwood as the overall highest-certified female country artist of all time, with over 95 million certified units sold in the US alone, including 22.5 million albums and 72.5 million singles, across solo titles and collaborations. Further on the RIAA Top Artists (Digital Songs) ranking, she is also the highest-certified female country artist, boasting 63 million certified song units across her solo catalog. Underwood was also the highest-certified country album artist to debut in the 21st century (a record later surpassed). She is the best-selling artist of the American Idol franchise, with a 2015 Billboard article calling her the ultimate Idol success story. Forbes declared Underwood the most successful American Idol winner of all time in 2017, with more albums sold and more revenue generated than any of the other contestants across the show's initial 15 seasons.

Underwood experienced quick commercial success in the industry, with her debut album, Some Hearts, becoming the fastest-selling debut country album in the history of the SoundScan era, the best-selling solo female debut album in country music history, the best-selling Country album of the last 14 years, and the best-selling album by an American Idol alum in the US. With her debut single, "Inside Your Heaven", she also broke Billboard chart history as the first country music artist ever to debut at number 1 on the Hot 100 and the song became the first song from a country artist to go to number 1 on the Hot 100 since country group Lonestar's "Amazed" did so in 2000. "Inside Your Heaven" is the only single by a solo country artist in the 2000 decade to reach number 1 on the Hot 100 chart.

With the singles from her second album, Carnival Ride, she became the first female country artist since Shania Twain in 1995 to have four tracks from one album top the Billboard Hot Country Songs. In 2010, with the singles of her third album, Play On, she achieved ten career number-one singles on the Hot Country Songs, an achievement for which she was named by the Guinness Book of World Records as the female country artist with the most number-one hits on the Billboard Hot Country Songs chart (since accurate sales records were introduced in the US in 1991), tied with Reba McEntire. She therefore became the only female artist in country music history to have eleven consecutive top two singles on that chart. At that time, she had twelve official country singles, including ten number-ones. She also became the first woman to score ten number-ones on such a chart since Rosanne Cash in 1988. She then broke and expanded her Guinness Book record by scoring four more number-one singles on the Hot Country Songs between 2011 and 2014, for a total of fourteen number-ones. She is also the woman with the most number-ones in the history of the Billboard Country Airplay chart, having had 15 leaders. In October 2021, she scored her sixteenth number one on the Country Airplay, with the joint single "If I Didn't Love You".

Underwood's first twenty-seven singles promoted to country radio all reached the top ten of both the Hot Country Songs and Country Airplay charts, the longest streak of top ten singles by a country artist from the start of a career. Since May 2011, Underwood is the Biggest American Idol Earner, with tour revenues and records sales combined. She is the fourth biggest album seller of the past 10 years in the United States. With her sixth studio album opening at number 1 on Billboard's Top 200 Albums chart, Underwood broke several records: she was the first woman to launch four country albums to number 1 there, as well as the first female country artist to top Billboard's The Artist 100 chart. In September 2018, Underwood received a star on the Hollywood Walk of Fame, for her numerous achievements in music.

After taking home over 20 awards from 2006 to 2019, Underwood became the most awarded artist in the history of the CMT Music Awards. As of October 2018, she has a net worth estimated at US$200 million. She has been the top-earning American Idol alum of all time since 2014. At the turn of the 2010 decade, Billboard named Underwood the top female country artist and seventh overall country artist. The magazine later ranked her at number 13 on its 2025 "Top 100 Women Artists of the 21st Century" list. In 2022, Pollstar said she was among the 15 all-genre top female touring artists of the past four decades, having sold over 4.3 million concert tickets and grossed around $265 million with her headlined tours. With Cry Pretty, Underwood became the first and only artist in American Music Award history to have all six consecutive albums win the Favorite Album award.

== Other ventures ==
=== Product endorsements ===
Underwood has had many endorsements throughout her career. She has signed multimillion-dollar deals with Skechers, Target, Nintendo, Olay, Nicole by OPI, Hershey's, Almay and Dick's Sporting Goods. In 2005, Underwood appeared in a Skechers global advertising campaign. In 2007, Underwood appeared in Target advertisements promoting her album Carnival Ride (2007). The limited edition of the album which included a behind the scenes DVD was exclusively sold at Target. In 2008, Underwood worked with Nintendo for the launch of their Nintendo DS appearing in various television commercials. That same year, Underwood became the spokesperson for Vitamin Water starring in television and magazine advertisements. Underwood also hosts a guide to a healthy lifestyle on Vitamin Water's website. In 2010, Underwood became the spokesperson for the Pedigree adoption drive. In 2011, she became the first celebrity brand ambassador for Olay skin care. Underwood has appeared in the global advertising campaign for their facial wash.

In January 2014, Underwood signed a deal with Nicole by OPI to launch 14 new nail lacquers. In the same month, Underwood had signed a deal to serve as Almay's global brand ambassador, where she would appear in TV and print advertisements for the brand later that month. In March 2015, Underwood released a fitness clothing line named CALIA by Carrie Underwood. In collaboration with Dick's Sporting Goods, the line features clothing that is intended to be suitable for both active and casual wear.

=== Philanthropy ===
Underwood established the Checotah Animal, Town, and School Foundation in 2009. The foundation helps with general causes, needs and services in the area of Checotah to impact the community. "My hometown is extremely supportive of me and I feel blessed to be able to create something as a way of giving back; to say thank you", said Underwood.

Underwood is a supporter of arts education. In 2009, Underwood's foundation "Checotah Animal, Town & School Foundation" and the Academy of Country Music foundation "ACM Lifting Lives" partnered to give students in Checotah, Oklahoma a gift valued at more than $120,000 in new instruments for their music programs. Underwood held a surprise concert at a local high school and then unveiled the gifts. The instruments will be shared throughout the Checotah school district and were ordered through Yamaha Corporate Artist Affairs at a special philanthropic price. During the 2011 holiday season, her foundation donated $350,000 to the Checotah schools.

Underwood launched the Academy of Country Music Lifting Lives Temporary Home Fund in 2010. The Fund specifically benefits victims of the Tennessee floods of early 2010 and it was kicked off with grants that Underwood received from ACM as Entertainer of the Year. She also teamed up with Brooks and Dunn to support the new Fund by recording a Public Service Announcement (PSA). Underwood is involved with several organizations that benefit children. In January 2010, she partnered with Country Cares for St. Jude Kids visiting the St. Jude Children's Research Hospital. In February 2011, Underwood donated $140,125 to Save the Children. This charitable initiative was inspired by the "36 cents" written in the lyrics of Underwood's album track "Change" on her album Play On, which addresses how even the smallest bit of spare change that one might have can add up to make a difference and help "change" the world.

Underwood is a supporter of the United Service Organization, Clothes Off Our Back, and Habitat For Humanity. To benefit cancer research, in August 2008, Underwood joined Beyoncé, Mariah Carey, Mary J. Blige, Miley Cyrus, and other female artists to record the song "Just Stand Up!" The proceeds benefited Stand Up to Cancer (SU2C). As a result of their fund raising efforts, the SU2C scientific advisory committee, overseen by the American Association for Cancer Research was able to award $73.6 million towards novel, groundbreaking research. The song peaked at number 11 on Billboard's Hot 100 Songs.

In 2012, Underwood donated $1 of every ticket sold on the North American leg of the Blown Away Tour to the Canadian and American Red Cross. On May 24, 2013, Underwood donated $1 million in proceeds from her recent Blown Away Tour to the Red Cross for relief efforts in response to the Oklahoma tornado.

=== Activism ===
Underwood is a supporter of animal welfare and of the Humane Society of the United States (HSUS), and has done several public service announcements for the organization. Underwood has also done a "Protect Your Pets" public service announcement for Do Something. In 2010, Underwood became the official spokesperson for the Pedigree adoption drive. On March 29, 2010, Underwood and Pedigree partnered to donate $10,000 to a New York City Animal Shelter. In April 2011, Underwood opened the Happy Paws Animal Shelter in her hometown. On January 10, 2012, it was reported but had previously been blogged by Underwood herself on her official fan-site, that the singer rescued an abandoned dog along a highway.

Underwood and her husband made a video for the "Do It for Daron" campaign urging young people to stop bullying. In July 2012, she publicly supported same-sex marriage, emphasizing that her evangelical church, GracePointe Church in Nashville, was gay-friendly. She told The Independent, "As a married person myself, I don't know what it's like to be told I can't marry somebody I love and want to marry", she said. "I can't imagine how that must feel. I definitely think we should all have the right to love, and love publicly, the people that we want to love." Underwood went on to say, "Our church is gay-friendly. Above all, God wanted us to love others. It's not about setting rules, or [saying] 'everyone has to be like me'. No. We're all different. That's what makes us special. We have to love each other and get on with each other. It's not up to me to judge anybody."

=== Acting ===
Underwood appeared on How I Met Your Mother in March 2010. She played the role of Tiffany, a medical sales rep that forms a relationship with Ted. This was the second highest rated episode for season five, gaining 10.48 million viewers. Brian Zoromski of IGN gave the episode 8.5 out of 10. He was surprised how well Underwood performed in her first acting role. A few months earlier, she appeared in an episode of the PBS children's television series Sesame Street, performing a voice-over as "Carrie Underworm" a worm who sings a song about worm pride before an auto race Sesame Street is holding.

Underwood made her film debut in Soul Surfer in April 2011. She played Sarah Hill, the church youth leader who helped Bethany Hamilton overcome the obstacles she faced after the shark attack.

Underwood played Maria von Trapp in NBC's The Sound of Music Live!. The three-hour telecast aired on December 5, 2013, partnering NBC with the producing team of Craig Zadan and Neil Meron. "To have a star like Carrie Underwood perform Maria in The Sound of Music, and in such a very special and unique production, is exciting beyond words", said Ted Chapin, president of the Rodgers & Hammerstein Organization. "Part of the magic of Rodgers and Hammerstein is how their work has adapted itself to so many different incarnations, and I am certain the fresh spirit Underwood brings to her own songs will transition into exciting versions of the classic songs we all know and love." Underwood played herself during the fourth season of Cobra Kai.

=== Writing ===
Underwood released her debut book, Find Your Path, on March 3, 2020, published by Dey Street Books. It became a New York Times best seller, debuting at number two on the How-To and Miscellaneous list. The book contains insight into Carrie's lifestyle and some of her favorite recipes, aiming to help people find their lifestyle.

== Personal life ==
=== Relationships ===
Underwood was first linked to NHL player Mike Fisher after they met at one of her concerts in late 2008, and they became engaged in December 2009. According to The Canadian Press, Fisher proposed in Ottawa on December 20, 2009. Underwood's engagement ring features a yellow diamond and was valued at $150,000. On July 10, 2010, Underwood and Fisher wed at the Ritz-Carlton Lodge in Greensboro, Georgia, with more than 250 people in attendance. The couple's first son was born on February 27, 2015. Their second son was born on January 21, 2019.

Between the births of her two sons, Underwood had three miscarriages. In 2018, she told CBS News that this was the basis for her song "Cry Pretty", as "I would have these horrible things going on in my life, and then have to go smile and, like, do some interviews or, like, do a photo shoot or something". On February 11, 2011, an Ottawa radio station, 105.3 KISS-FM, stated that it would ban the playing of Underwood's music because her husband, Mike Fisher, was traded to the Nashville Predators the day before. Due to Underwood's fans' threats on Facebook to never tune into the radio station, the station later apologized for its actions, saying that its statements were meant to be taken as a joke, as it does not play Underwood's country songs anyway, and it was its "tongue-in-cheek way of wishing Fisher the best of luck in Nashville." Fisher later criticized the station saying "obviously Carrie had nothing to do with the move or the trade or anything so to imply something like that was just wrong", and noting that both he and Underwood were disappointed in the negativity the radio station created. Underwood was selected by The Hockey News on its annual list of the 100 People of Power and Influence in Ice Hockey. For the 2012 list, Underwood ranked at number 85.

In 2010, Underwood and Fisher bought a mansion on eleven acres near Ottawa in the luxurious Spruce Ridge district. The couple later put the mansion up for sale at an asking price of $2.2 million. In 2012, the couple bought a cottage outside of Nashville. They use the cottage for weekend getaways. Oprah Winfrey toured the cottage and interviewed Underwood and Fisher there for their appearance on Oprah's Next Chapter.

=== Personal interests ===
Underwood is a practicing Evangelical Christian, and a vegetarian. She stopped eating meat at the age of 13 because she could not stand the thought of eating one of her own animals. She was voted "World's Sexiest Vegetarian" by PETA in 2007 for the second time, the first being in 2005 alongside Coldplay frontman Chris Martin, who was himself a vegetarian at the time.

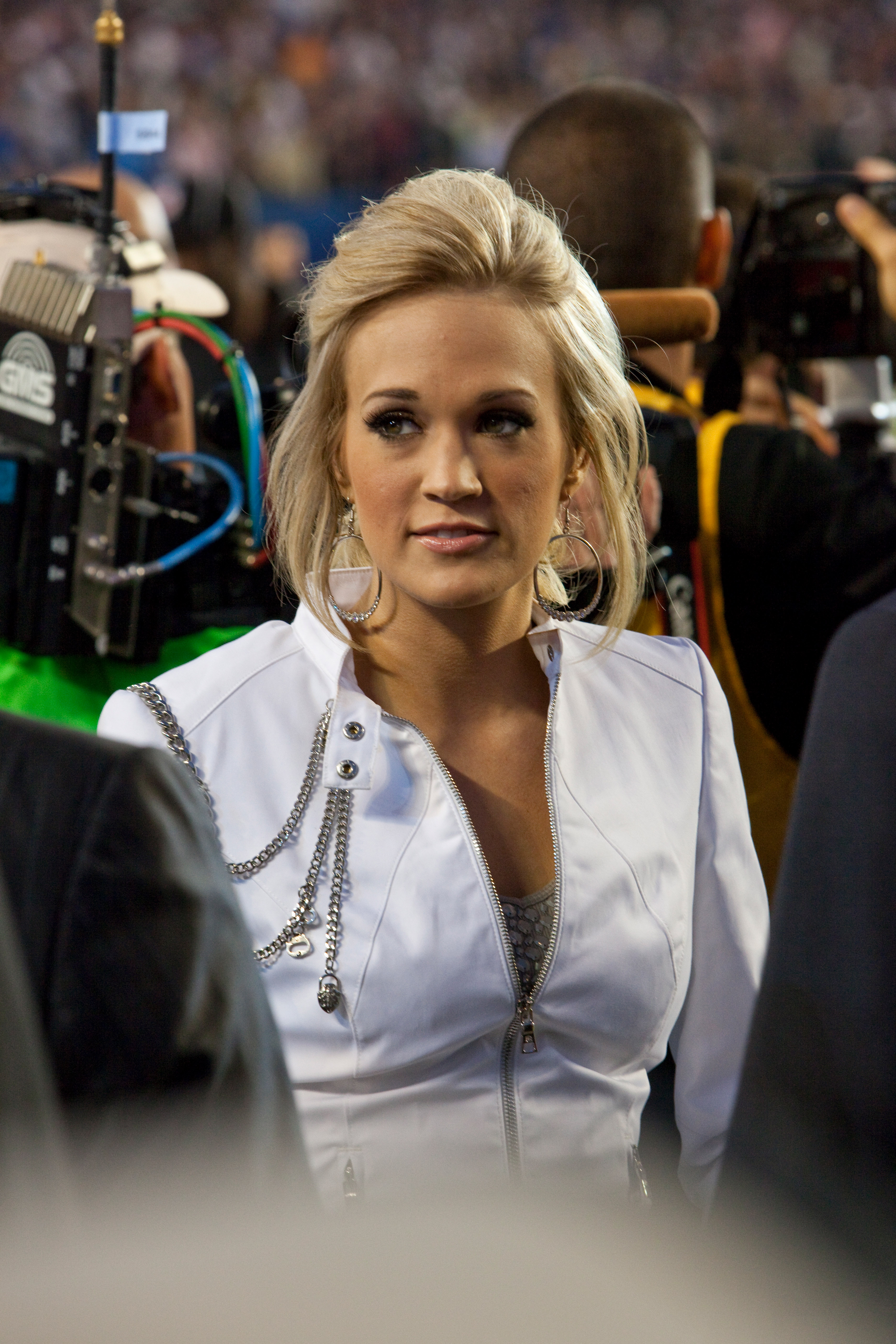
Underwood performs at Super Bowl XLIV in February 2010

In a 2007 interview with PETA, Underwood stated, "Ever since I was little I loved animals ... If you told me I could never sing again, I'd say that was horrible, but it's not my life. If you told me I could never be around animals again, I would just die." In April 2022, Underwood shared the loss of her dog, Ace, whom she had adopted in 2007. Ten months later, Underwood shared she had adopted a new dog, named Charlie, who she met backstage while touring in Charlotte, North Carolina.

In April 2013, Underwood spoke out with disapproval regarding the Tennessee "Ag Gag bill". The bill makes it a crime to videotape animal cruelty or abuse and then fail to turn in the evidence to authorities within 48 hours. This is to stop animal rights activists from accumulating enough documentation to prove that animal cruelty is routine in big agribusiness. Underwood tweeted, "Shame on TN lawmakers for passing the Ag Gag bill. If Gov. Bill Haslam signs this, he needs to expect me at his front door. Who's with me?" State Rep. Andy Holt responded to her tweet, saying, "I would say that Carrie Underwood will stick to singing, I'll stick to lawmaking." Underwood later responded via Twitter, "I should stick to singing? Wow...sorry, I'm just a tax-paying citizen concerned for the safety of my family. #NoAgGag". She also tweeted Tennessee governor Bill Haslam, saying "Please don't sign the Ag Gag bill. Think about the welfare of the animals as well as the consumers. I'm begging you..."

Underwood has stated that she has a great interest in sports. She has participated in the annual City of Hope Celebrity Softball tournament for charity for many years. The event takes place in Nashville, Tennessee, and benefits research for life-threatening diseases. In 2005, she performed the "Star-Spangled Banner" at Game 4 of the NBA Finals between the San Antonio Spurs and Detroit Pistons, and in 2006 at the NBA All-Star Game. She performed at halftime of the 2006 Thanksgiving Day football game at Texas Stadium in Irving, Texas, and was friends with Dallas Cowboys quarterback Tony Romo. She also performed the "Star-Spangled Banner" at the NFC Championship Game between the Seattle Seahawks and Carolina Panthers in 2006, as well as at the 2006 edition of NASCAR's Coca-Cola 600, the MLB All Star Game in Pittsburgh, and at Game 3 of the 2007 World Series between the Boston Red Sox and Colorado Rockies. On February 7, 2010, Underwood performed the National Anthem for Super Bowl XLIV.

Underwood has performed the opening theme song for NBC Sunday Night Football since 2013. Faith Hill, whom Underwood replaced, later expressed full support for Underwood, congratulating her via Twitter and stating that it was "an awesome choice" by NBC/SNF and that Underwood "will rock it". Underwood's original song was a modification of her song "Oh, Sunday Night", but was changed to an original song, "Game On", for the 2018 NFL season. She sang the National Anthem for the Nashville Predators prior to their victory over the Chicago Blackhawks in Game 3 of the first round of the 2017 Stanley Cup Playoffs, and prior to their victory over the Winnipeg Jets in Game 2 of the second round of the 2018 Stanley Cup Playoffs.

== Discography ==
- Some Hearts (2005)
- Carnival Ride (2007)
- Play On (2009)
- Blown Away (2012)
- Storyteller (2015)
- Cry Pretty (2018)
- My Gift (2020)
- My Savior (2021)
- Denim & Rhinestones (2022)

== Tours and residencies ==
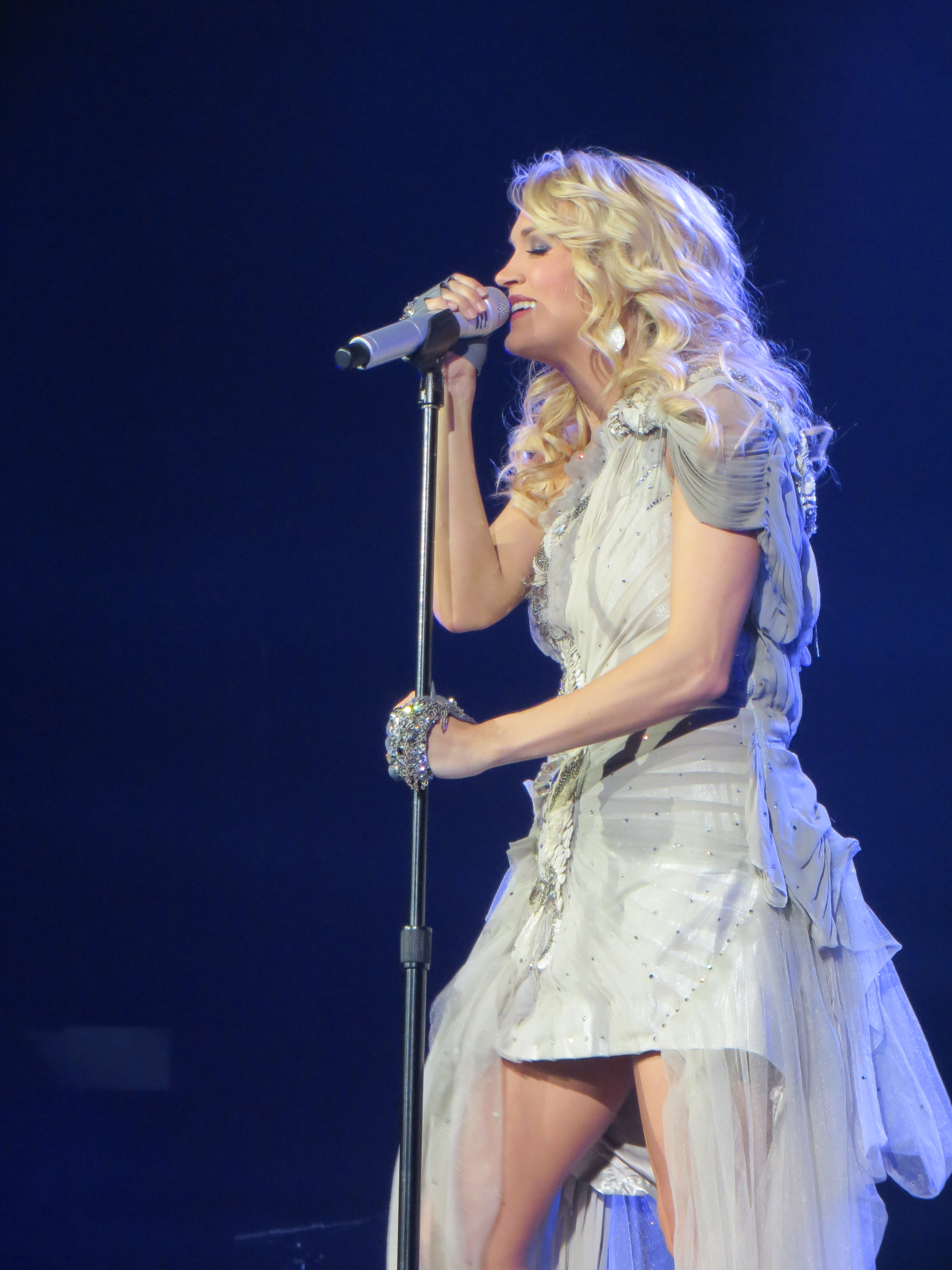
Underwood performing during the Blown Away World Tour in May 2013

=== Headlining ===
- Carrie Underwood: Live in Concert (2006)
- Carnival Ride Tour (2008)
- Play On Tour (2010–2011)
- Blown Away Tour (2012–2013)
- Storyteller Tour: Stories in the Round (2016)
- Cry Pretty Tour 360 (2019)
- Denim & Rhinestones Tour (2022–2023)

=== Residencies ===
- Reflection (2021–2025)

=== Co-headlining ===
- American Idols Live! Tour 2005 (2005)
- Love, Pain and the Whole Crazy Carnival Ride Tour (2008) (with Keith Urban)
- C2C: Country to Country with Tim McGraw (2013) and with Miranda Lambert / Eric Church (2016)
- Ripcord World Tour – Oceania Leg (with Keith Urban) (2016)

== Filmography ==
Film and television performances
Year	Title	Role	Notes
2005	American Idol	Contestant	Season four winner
2007, 2008	Saturday Night Live	Musical guest	Two episodes
2008	Stand Up to Cancer	Herself	TV special
2008–2019	Country Music Association Awards	Herself/co-host	Alongside Brad Paisley; Reba McEntire and Dolly Parton in 2019; Also Writer
2009	Carrie Underwood: An All-Star Holiday Special	Herself	
2009	Sesame Street	Carrie Underworm (voice)	"Squirmadega Car Race" (Dec. 28); song: "The Worm Anthem"
2009	CMT Invitation Only	Herself	Autumn 2009
2010	How I Met Your Mother	Tiffany	Episode: "Hooked"
2010	The Buried Life	Herself	
2010	Extreme Makeover: Home Edition	Herself	
2011	Blue Bloods	Herself	Episode: "Mercy"
2011	Soul Surfer	Sarah Hill	Film debut
2012	Zendaya: Behind the Scenes	Herself	Documentary
2012	CMT Crossroads	Herself	With Steven Tyler
2013–present	NBC Sunday Night Football	Herself	Theme song performer
2013, 2014	Nashville	Herself	Episodes: "I'll Never Get Out of This World Alive", "You're Lookin' at Country"
2013	The Sound of Music Live!	Maria Rainir/von Trapp	NBC original production
2014	CMA Country Christmas	Herself	TV special
2016	Talking Dead	Herself	Discussion of The Walking Dead episode "No Way Out"
2016	Popstar: Never Stop Never Stopping	Herself	
2017	Living Every Day: Luke Bryan	Herself	TV special
2018	American Idol	Herself	Season 16; opening narration, advising appearance (Carrie Underwood/Mothers' Day Dedications)
2019	Elvis: All Star Tribute	Herself	TV special
2019	Live with Kelly and Ryan	Herself	Guest Host
2019	Dolly Parton: Here She Comes Again!	Herself	TV special
2019	Brad Paisley Thinks He's Special	Herself	TV special
2019	Kennedy Center Honors	Herself	TV special (tribute to Linda Ronstadt)
2020	ACM Presents: Our Country	Herself	TV special
2020	Mike and Carrie: God & Country	Herself	I Am Second Original Series (4 episodes)
2020	My Gift: A Christmas Special from Carrie Underwood	Herself	HBO Max Special; Also executive producer
2021	Cobra Kai	Herself	Episode: "The Fall"
2024	Nate Bargatze's Nashville Christmas	Herself	Christmas Special
2024	Dick Clark's New Year's Rockin' Eve	Herself/Performer	New Year's Special
2025	American Idol	Herself	Judge

== See also ==
- List of artists who reached number one in the United States
- List of artists who reached number one on the U.S. country chart
- List of best-selling music artists in the United States
- List of Idols winners

Awards
Preceded by Emmylou Harris	Grammy Award for Best Female Country Vocal Performance; 2007–2009	Succeeded by Taylor Swift
Preceded by Taylor Swift; Darius Rucker	Grammy Award for Best Country Solo Performance; 2013; 2015	Succeeded by Darius Rucker; Chris Stapleton
Preceded by Dierks Bentley	Country Music Association Award for Horizon Award; 2006	Succeeded by Taylor Swift
Preceded by Gretchen Wilson; Miranda Lambert; Miranda Lambert	Country Music Association Award for Female Vocalist of the Year; 2006–2008; 2016; 2018	Succeeded by Taylor Swift; Miranda Lambert; Kacey Musgraves
Preceded by Sara Evans	Academy of Country Music Award for Female Vocalist of the Year; 2007–2009	Succeeded by Miranda Lambert
Preceded by Kenny Chesney; Keith Urban	Academy of Country Music Award for Entertainer of the Year; 2009–2010; 2020	Succeeded by Taylor Swift current with Thomas Rhett
