= Something in the Water (Carrie Underwood song) =

Single by Carrie Underwood

from the album Greatest Hits: Decade #1
- Released: September 29, 2014
- Recorded: 2014
- Genre: Christian; country
- Length: 3:56
- Label: Arista Nashville
- Songwriters: Carrie Underwood; Chris DeStefano; Brett James; (Note: Contains uncredited sample of "Amazing Grace" by John Newton.)
- Producer: Mark Bright

Carrie Underwood singles chronology
"Somethin' Bad" (2014)	"Something in the Water" (2014)	"Little Toy Guns" (2015)

Music video
- "Something in the Water" on YouTube

"Something in the Water" is a song co-written and recorded by American country music artist Carrie Underwood, from her compilation album Greatest Hits: Decade #1. The song was released on September 29, 2014, as the album's lead single through Arista Nashville. It was written by Underwood, Chris DeStefano, Brett James, and produced by Mark Bright.

A crossover success, "Something in the Water" reached No. 1 on both the Billboard Hot Country Songs and Hot Christian Songs charts. It is Underwood's 14th career leader on Hot Country Songs and her second in 2014. It topped the former chart for seven weeks and the latter for 26 weeks, and also debuted at number 24 on the Billboard Hot 100. It also peaked at number 29 in Canada. It set and broke multiple airplay records on country radio in its first week. It was the second-bestselling Christian song of 2014 in the US, the bestselling Christian song of 2015 in the US, and the fifth-bestselling Christian song of the 2010s decade in the US.

The song won the Grammy Award for Best Country Solo Performance.

== Background ==
""Something in the Water" is so inspirational. It's so joyous! I can't help but smile when I hear it. I hope it has the same effect on everyone who listens to it."

—Underwood on the song

The song was written by Underwood along with Chris DeStefano and Brett James, and produced by Underwood's longtime producer Mark Bright. It also has a sample of Amazing Grace at the closing of the song, sung by Underwood.

James told Country Weekly that, when he arrived at Underwood's cabin in Leiper's Fork, Tennessee, for a songwriter's session, she and DeStefano already had a track ready, when Underwood suggested "Something in the Water" as a title. They then chose to make the song themed after a person whose life changes after baptism. James said that he found Underwood's demo of the song "emotional", and praised Underwood's singing and songwriting style. He later called it "one of the most perfect writing days I have had in my life".

== Critical reception ==
"Something in the Water" was met with widespread critical acclaim. Rolling Stone praised the song stating that "Underwood sings in the soaring song showcasing her heavenly high vocal range" and called the song a "spiritual heartstring-tugger". Billboard praised the song with 4 out of 5 stars, stating: "Carrie Underwood offers a message of faith in times of trouble". Music Times praised the song by saying that Underwood "pulls out all of her strongest, boldest notes for the religious anthem" and that the song "builds to some of the greatest heights Underwood has reached to date". All Access Music also praised the song, stating that "It's a welcome – and bold – move for Underwood that flies in the face of Country's recent direction. Her vocals soar and to no one's surprise she powerfully delivers the message". AXS called "Something in the Water" a "mighty offering" while praising Underwood for a "righteously powerful performance."

Website Taste of Country praised Underwood's vocals and the songs's lyrics and production, saying "Mark Bright creates a complex and rich tapestry that swirls between the rare breathes Underwood takes. Her vocal performance is typically stunning and personal" and also predicted the song "to clean up come 2015 awards season". Website Popdust gave the song a rating of 4.5/5, saying, "assembled with an orchestral arrangement and a backing of a harmoniously sanctified choir, this track...is a game changer." The website also praised Underwood bringing faith back into her song.

On February 8, 2015, at the 57th Grammy Awards, Underwood won Best Country Solo Performance for "Something in the Water", marking her seventh career Grammy Award.

== Awards and nominations ==
=== Billboard Music Awards ===
Year	Nominee / work	Award	Result
2015	"Something in the Water"	Top Christian Song	Won

=== Country Music Association Awards ===
Year	Nominee / work	Award	Result
2015	"Something in the Water"	Music Video of the Year	Nominated

=== CMT Music Awards ===
Year	Nominee / work	Award	Result
2015	"Something in the Water"	Video of the Year	Won
2015	"Something in the Water"	Female Video of the Year	Won

=== Grammy Awards ===
Year	Nominee / work	Award	Result
2015	"Something in the Water"	Best Country Solo Performance	Won

=== Music Row Awards ===
Year	Nominee / work	Award	Result
2015	"Something in the Water"	Song of the Year	Nominated

=== Inspirational Country Music Awards ===
Year	Nominee / work	Award	Result
2015	"Something in the Water"	Mainstream Inspirational Song of the Year	Won
2015	"Something in the Water"	Inspirational Video of the Year	Won

== Chart performance ==
"Something in the Water" sold over 125,000 copies in its first week, becoming the biggest opening-week sales of any female country artist in 2014 and the singer's highest sales frame since 2009, when "I Told You So", featuring Randy Travis, sold 126,000 copies. It is also Underwood's best debut sales week for a digital song. It debuted at No. 4 on Billboard's Digital Songs chart. The song's massive airplay in its first week prompted it to also debuted at No. 17 on the Billboard Country Airplay chart, achieving the highest debut for a solo artist in 2014 and surpassing Underwood's previous record of No. 20 with "So Small" in 2007. Additionally, it set an all-time record by amassing 144 total stations on impact date on Mediabase. The song debuted at No. 1 on the Billboard Hot Christian Songs, becoming the singer's first song to top such a chart, and rose from No. 48 to number two on the Billboard Hot Country Songs in its second week on the chart. It also debuted at No. 24 on the Billboard Hot 100 chart.

In its seventh week on the charts, "Something in the Water" reached No.1 on the Billboard Hot Country Songs, becoming Underwood's 14th career leader on the chart and her second in 2014. It became her fastest climbing single on the Hot Country Songs chart. With 14 chart-toppers on such a chart, she expands her record as the female country artist with the most number one hits on the Hot Country Songs chart in the Nielsen SoundScan era (1991–present), breaking her own Guinness Book record of ten, set in 2010. It has topped the Hot Country Songs for seven weeks, becoming her longest No.1 reign on the chart and the third longest No.1 reign among women in the chart's history. The song has also topped the Hot Christian Songs for 26 consecutive weeks,setting a record for the longest reign on that chart by a woman and also the third longest running number one. The song's record was broken by Lauren Daigle's "You Say.". The song was certified 2× Platinum by the RIAA on July 23, 2020. As of April, 2016, the song has sold over 1,100,000 copies in the United States.

The song won Top Christian Song at the 2015 Billboard Music Awards.

== Music video ==
""We took it in a direction that was probably not what most people would think." "We made it joyful and happy and uplifting."

—Underwood describing the video to Entertainment Tonight

The music video was directed by Raj Kapoor and premiered on November 4, 2014, on Twitter during the 48th Annual CMA Awards. Emmy nominated choreographer Travis Wall choreographed the video.

Underwood performed with dancers from the Shaping Sound dance academy dancing in the background and "required 16 choir members, 12 dancers, three costume changes and a custom-built tank of recycled water to create its dance spectacle."

== Live performances ==
Underwood performed the song at 2014 CMA Awards and on April 7, 2016, at the fifteenth season finale of American Idol. The song is also performed as the encore of her "Storyteller Tour: Stories in the Round".

== Track listing ==
Digital download

1. "Something in the Water" – 3:45

== Charts and certifications ==
=== Weekly charts ===
Chart (2014–2015)	Peak position
Canada (Canadian Hot 100)	29
Canada Country (Billboard)	3
Scotland Singles (OCC)	88
UK Singles (Official Charts Company)	192
US Billboard Hot 100	24
US Christian Airplay (Billboard)	26
US Country Airplay (Billboard)	3
US Hot Christian Songs (Billboard)	1
US Hot Country Songs (Billboard)	1

=== Year-end charts ===
Chart (2014)	Position
US Country Airplay (Billboard)	84
US Hot Christian Songs (Billboard)	2
US Hot Country Songs (Billboard)	58

Chart (2015)	Position
US Country Airplay (Billboard)	49
US Hot Country Songs (Billboard)	36
US Hot Christian Songs (Billboard)	1

=== Decade-end charts ===
Chart (2010s)	Position
US Christian Songs (Billboard)	5

=== Certifications ===
Region	Certification	Certified units/sales
United States (RIAA)	2× Platinum	1,100,000

== Release history ==
Region	Date	Format(s)	Label	Ref
Canada	September 29, 2014	Digital download	Arista Nashville; 19	
United Kingdom	September 29, 2014	Digital download	Arista Nashville; 19	
United States	September 29, 2014	Digital download	Arista Nashville; 19	
United States	October 6, 2014	Country radio	Arista Nashville; 19	
