= Little Toy Guns =

Single by Carrie Underwood

from the album Greatest Hits: Decade #1
- Released: February 16, 2015
- Recorded: 2014
- Genre: Country pop; country rock
- Length: 3:31
- Label: Arista Nashville; 19
- Songwriters: Carrie Underwood; Chris DeStefano; Hillary Lindsey
- Producer: Mark Bright

Carrie Underwood singles chronology
"Something in the Water" (2014)	"Little Toy Guns" (2015)	"Smoke Break" (2015)

Music video
- "Little Toy Guns" on YouTube

"Little Toy Guns" is a song recorded by American country music artist Carrie Underwood for her compilation album Greatest Hits: Decade #1. It was released on February 16, 2015, through Arista Nashville as the album's second single. It was written by Underwood, Chris DeStefano, and Hillary Lindsey, and produced by Mark Bright.

The song was nominated for Best Country Solo Performance at the 58th Grammy Awards.

== Background and composition ==
"I’ve seen it firsthand from different people in my life and seen how the tumultuous parental relationship [...] can affect a child. So that’s kind of what it’s about, but it’s a really tempo-driven song as well, so it’s kind of a bit of a juxtaposition as far as the story content and the music … It sounds rockin’, but it has a positive message."

— Carrie Underwood on the inspiration behind the song.

The song was written by Underwood with frequent collaborators Chris DeStefano and Hillary Lindsey, and was produced by Mark Bright. Drawing on country and rock influences in its composition, "Little Toy Guns" features a "heavy and orchestral" arrangement with emotionally resonant lyrics and an "uplifting" melody. Critics have also called the song a prequel of sorts to her 2012 hit "Blown Away" for the songs' similar thematic content and "stormy" sonic aesthetic. Lyrically, the song tells a story of domestic violence revolving around a young child overhearing her parents fighting and wanting to escape from the pain. Underwood narrates the chorus from the child's perspective, stating that she wishes the angry words were fake "like little toy guns" so they wouldn't hurt.

== Critical reception ==
The song received mostly positive reviews with acclaim going to Underwood's vocals, production of the song, and the lyrics. Allmusic editor Stephen Thomas Erlewine called this song "bombastic." News OK called this song "meaningful" and added that it "sounds fresh enough to have fans craving another new studio collection sooner rather than later." Pipy Ellwood concluded that the song is "a mid-tempo number that will appeal to fans of Underwood’s more uptempo moments." Renowned for Sound described that Underwood's "strong vocals create a vigorous atmosphere that fans old and new are going to love." Digital Journals editor Markos Padatados agreed, stating that, "yet again, [Underwood] showcases her trademark pipes."

== Commercial performance ==
"Little Toy Guns" entered the Billboard Hot Country Songs at number 40 and peaked at number six. It debuted at number 99 on the Hot 100 chart and peaked at number 47. It peaked at number 2 on the Country Airplay Chart, number seven on the Canadian Country Chart, and number 70 on Canadian Hot 100. As of September 2015, the single has sold 437,000 copies in the US.

The song was officially certified Platinum by the RIAA on July 23, 2020.

== Music video ==
Underwood posted a teaser video to her social media accounts on January 28, 2015, with the caption "Friday..." and the hashtags #LittleToyGuns and #CUX1 (Carrie Underwood Decade 1, an initialism for her greatest hits album), which was later confirmed as a preview for the "Little Toy Guns" video premiering via Facebook on January 30, 2015. The video was directed by P. R. Brown, who has previously collaborated with Underwood's on her "Two Black Cadillacs" video. The video managed to reach 7.5 million Facebook views on its debut week before being deleted off Facebook and being officially released to Vevo and YouTube. The video received positive feedback and was nominated for "Female Video of the Year" at the 2015 CMT Music Awards; however, it lost to another of Carrie's videos, the one for her previous single "Something in the Water" (which also won "Video of the Year" at the ceremony).

The video stars Grace Rundhaug, who starred alongside Underwood in The Sound of Music Live! television special, as a girl who escapes her parents' fighting by mentally transporting herself to a "storybook land" where she plays a mythical hero and reunites her captive parents. Sara Antonio plays the mother and Kris Wente plays the father, who start the video with a "vicious fight (sans any music at all)." Underwood can be seen in between, singing the song in various locations of the forest. Beville Dunkerley at Rolling Stone noted that the end of the video provides a more peaceful resolution than the lyrics of the song.

== Awards and nominations ==
=== CMT Music Awards ===
Year	Nominee / work	Award	Result
2015	"Little Toy Guns"	Female Video of the Year	Nominated

=== Grammy Awards ===
Year	Nominee / work	Award	Result
2016	"Little Toy Guns"	Best Country Solo Performance	Nominated

=== Teen Choice Awards ===
Year	Nominee / work	Award	Result
2015	"Little Toy Guns"	Choice Country Song	Won

== Charts ==
Chart (2015)	Peak position
Canada Hot 100 (Billboard)	70
Canada Country (Billboard)	7
US Billboard Hot 100	47
US Country Airplay (Billboard)	2
US Hot Country Songs (Billboard)	6

=== Year-end charts ===
Chart (2015)	Position
US Country Airplay (Billboard)	47
US Hot Country Songs (Billboard)	22

== Certifications ==
Region	Certification	Certified units/sales
United States (RIAA)	Platinum	1,000,000^{‡}
^{‡} Sales+streaming figures based on certification alone.
