= Greatest Hits: Decade Number 1 =

Greatest Hits: Decade #1

Greatest hits album by Carrie Underwood
- Released: December 9, 2014
- Recorded: 2005–2014
- Genre: Country pop
- Label: Arista Nashville; 19
- Producer: Mark Bright; Desmond Child; Frank Rogers

Carrie Underwood chronology
Blown Away (2012)	Greatest Hits: Decade #1 (2014)	Storyteller (2015)

Singles from Greatest Hits: Decade Number 1
- 1. "Something in the Water" Released: September 29, 2014; 2. "Little Toy Guns" Released: February 16, 2015

Greatest Hits: Decade #1 is the first greatest hits double album by American singer Carrie Underwood, released on December 9, 2014, by Arista Nashville. The release contains every single from Underwood's first four studio albums: Some Hearts (2005), Carnival Ride (2007), Play On (2009), and Blown Away (2012), except "Some Hearts" from its album of the same name. Two newly recorded songs were included: "Something in the Water" and "Little Toy Guns". The album also contains four additional tracks.

The compilation debuted at number four on the Billboard 200 and at number one on the Top Country Albums charts, and set several records upon release, including having the biggest sales debut for a hits collection in any genre of music in more than six years and the biggest first-week sales for a female hits album in any genre in over nine years. It went on to become the largest selling greatest hits album of 2015, and has been certified Platinum by the RIAA.

The album's first single, "Something in the Water" won the 2014 Grammy Award for Best Country Solo Performance. The following year, "Little Toy Guns" was nominated for the same award.

== Background and content ==
I can't believe it's been a decade since I auditioned for American Idol. Looking back at the songs I've released over the years lets me relive my amazing journey. Even better I get to include new music for the fans! So much has happened since then. In some ways it feels like it was a million years ago; in some ways it feels like it was just yesterday. I remember as a kid just being so excited whenever someone would come out with a greatest hits because it was all my favorites in one little package. I'm honored that I've had that much love and support over the past 10 years that I get to have one. I'm blessed, and I'm so happy that I still get to do what I love.

— Underwood on her first decade in the business and her first compilation

On September 26, 2014, during an appearance on The Today Show, Underwood announced her plans to release Greatest Hits: Decade #1 on December 9, 2014, as a celebration of her tenth anniversary of winning the fourth season of American Idol. The same day, she announced the compilation's first single, "Something in the Water". About the content of the compilation, Underwood said, "I don't think it would be quite as exciting if I didn't have something new for the album".

== Packaging ==
The compilation contains 25 tracks in two discs, 19 of which are previously released singles. It comes with two newly recorded songs, "Something in the Water" and "Little Toy Guns". About including "How Great Thou Art" on her collection, Underwood stated the song had taken "on a life of its own", noting that fans frequently told her they loved that performance and revisited it "online all the time". She said this response made it important to include the song on an album, describing the performance as "a really amazing moment" that she and Vince Gill both felt. It also features four additional tracks, including her previously unreleased, live version of "How Great Thou Art" with Vince Gill, a song they performed together for the ACM Presents: Girls' Night Out TV concert. The other three additional tracks are songwriting worktape versions of "So Small", "Last Name" and "Mama's Song". On including these, Underwood explained that they were included as an alternative form of "extras", stating that they were recorded on the day the songs were written and describing them as "pretty special".

== Singles ==
"Something in the Water" was released as the first single from the compilation, on September 29, 2014. The song was written by Underwood along with Chris DeStefano and Brett James, and produced by Underwood's longtime producer Mark Bright. It also has a sample of "Amazing Grace" at the end of the song, sung by Underwood. It became a crossover success, having topped the Billboard Hot Country Songs chart for seven weeks and the Hot Christian Songs chart for 26 consecutive weeks. It also reached No. 24 on the Billboard Hot 100 chart. On August 10, 2015, "Something in the Water" was certified Platinum by RIAA. At the 57th Grammy Awards, the song won the Grammy award for Best Country Solo Performance.

In February 2015,"Little Toy Guns" was released as the second single from the compilation. The song was released to country radio on February 16, 2015. The track peaked at number six on Billboard's Hot Country Songs, being her 21st top 10 songs from the chart. It also peaked at number two on the Country Airplay Chart and number 47 on the Hot 100. On August 10, 2015, it was certified Gold by RIAA. The song was nominated for Best Country Solo Performance at the 58th Grammy Awards.

== Commercial performance ==
Greatest Hits: Decade Number #1 sold 94,000 copies in its first week, debuting at number four on the Billboard 200 and at number one on the Top Country Albums charts. It is the biggest sales debut for a hits collection in any genre of music in more than six years, when Frank Sinatra's Nothing But the Best arrived in May 2008, and the biggest first-week sales for a female hits album in any genre in over nine years, when Reba McEntire's Reba #1's opened in November 2005. Furthermore, it is the biggest debut sales week for a country best-of title since Toby Keith's 35 Biggest Hits debuted in May 2008, and logs the biggest sales week for a best-of since Whitney Houston's Whitney: The Greatest Hits shifted 112,000 on the chart dated March 17, 2012. The album was certified Platinum on January 8, 2016, as 500,000 copies shipped but counted as a million for double album. Greatest Hits: Decade #1 became the largest-selling greatest hits album of 2015. The album has sold 564,300 copies as of April 2017.

In terms of chart positions, on the Billboard 200, Greatest Hits: Decade #1 has the highest ranking for a newly released greatest hits album since Kenny Chesney's Greatest Hits II debuted and peaked at number three in May 2009. It's the highest-charting greatest hits album since Frank Sinatra's 2008 collection Nothing but the Best rebounded to number three in August 2012. On the Top Country Albums chart, Underwood scored her fifth consecutive number one bow, of five career releases, as Greatest Hits: Decade #1 debuted atop the chart. She is only the second artist to arrive with five number one debuts on Top Country Albums (which premiered in 1964), with Miranda Lambert being the other one. Underwood is first female artist to debut at number one on the Top Country Albums chart with a greatest hits album since Shania Twain's Greatest Hits had 11 weeks on top from November 2004 to January 2005. In the United Kingdom, the collection debuted at number two on the Country Compilation Album chart and a year later it reached number one, on November 13, 2015.

== Critical reception ==
Professional ratings
Review scores
Source	Rating
AllMusic	4/5 stars
Vice (Expert Witness)	(2-star Honorable Mention)

Reviewing for AllMusic, Stephen Thomas Erlewine said "the 21 singles – which are supplemented by three demos that reveal Carrie works well in a stark setting, too – are of a piece, expertly constructed post-Shania and Faith Hill country-pop proving that Underwood is the new-millennial heir to their throne." Robert Christgau was less enthusiastic in Vice. He highlighted "Mama's Song", "Two Black Cadillacs", and "Remind Me", while briefly summarizing the album with the following commentary on Underwood: "Big enough to command great songs, even to put her hand to a feminist few, but not big enough to trust her indoor voice".

== Track listing ==
Disc one
No.	Title	Writer(s)	Original album	Length
1.	"Something in the Water"	Underwood; Chris DeStefano; Brett James; (Note: Contains uncredited sample of "Amazing Grace" by John Newton.)	New recording	3:58
2.	"Little Toy Guns"	Underwood; DeStefano; Hillary Lindsey	New recording	3:31
3.	"Inside Your Heaven"	Andreas Carlsson; Pelle Nylén; Savan Kotecha	Non-album single (2005)	4:04
4.	"Jesus, Take the Wheel"	Lindsey; James; Gordie Sampson	Some Hearts (2005)	3:46
5.	"Don't Forget to Remember Me"	Ashley Gorley; Morgane Hayes; Kelley Lovelace	Some Hearts	4:00
6.	"Before He Cheats"	Josh Kear; Chris Tompkins	Some Hearts	3:20
7.	"Wasted"	Lindsey; Marv Green; Troy Verges	Some Hearts	4:34
8.	"So Small"	Underwood; Lindsey; Luke Laird	Carnival Ride (2007)	3:46
9.	"All-American Girl"	Underwood; Gorley; Lovelace	Carnival Ride	3:33
10.	"Last Name"	Underwood; Lindsey; Laird	Carnival Ride	4:02
11.	"Just a Dream"	Lindsey; Sampson; Steve McEwan	Carnival Ride	4:45
12.	"I Told You So" (featuring Randy Travis)	Randy Travis	Carnival Ride	4:17
Total length:				47:29

Disc two
No.	Title	Writer(s)	Original album	Length
1.	"Cowboy Casanova"	Underwood; James; Mike Elizondo	Play On (2009)	3:56
2.	"Temporary Home"	Underwood; Laird; Zac Maloy	Play On	4:28
3.	"Undo It"	Underwood; Laird; Kara DioGuardi; Marti Frederiksen	Play On	2:57
4.	"Mama's Song"	Underwood; Laird; DioGuardi; Frederiksen	Play On	4:01
5.	"Remind Me" (duet with Brad Paisley)	Paisley; Lovelace; Chris DuBois	This Is Country Music (2011)	4:14
6.	"Good Girl"	Underwood; DeStefano; Gorley	Blown Away (2012)	3:25
7.	"Blown Away"	Kear; Tompkins	Blown Away	4:00
8.	"Two Black Cadillacs"	Underwood; Kear; Lindsey	Blown Away	4:58
9.	"See You Again"	Underwood; Lindsey; David Hodges	Blown Away	4:07
10.	"How Great Thou Art" (with Vince Gill) (Live from ACM Presents: Girls Night Out)	Carl Gustav Boberg; Stuart Hine	Previously unreleased	4:47
11.	"So Small" (Writing Session Worktape 1/24/07)		Previously unreleased	4:07
12.	"Last Name" (Writing Session Worktape 1/22/07)		Previously unreleased	4:00
13.	"Mama's Song" (Writing Session Worktape 2/5/09)		Previously unreleased	3:51
Total length:				52:51

US iTunes Store bonus video
No.	Title	Director	Length
1.	"Something in the Water" (music video)	Raj Kapoor	3:59
Total length:			104:19

== Personnel ==
Credits were adapted from AllMusic.

Musicians

- Robert Bailey Jr. – background vocals
- Eddie Bayers – drums
- Joe Chemay – background vocals
- Perry Coleman – background vocals
- Eric Darken – percussion
- Chris DeStefano – background vocals
- Stuart Duncan – fiddle, acoustic guitar, mandolin
- Steve Gibson – acoustic guitar
- Vince Gill – vocals on "How Great Thou Art"
- Kenny Greenberg – electric guitar
- Vicki Hampton – background vocals
- Brett James – background vocals
- John Barlow Jarvis – piano
- Charlie Judge – synthesizer
- Hillary Lindsey – background vocals
- Chris McHugh – drums
- Brent Mason – electric guitar
- Jimmy Nichols – piano
- Brad Paisley – duet vocals and electric guitar on "Remind Me"
- Kim Parent – background vocals
- Larry Paxton – bass guitar
- Jimmie Lee Sloas – bass guitar
- Edgar Struble – acoustic guitar, keyboards
- Ilya Toshinsky – banjo, acoustic guitar
- Randy Travis – duet vocals on "I Told You So"
- Carrie Underwood – lead vocals, background vocals
- Tommy White – steel guitar

Technical personnel

- Adam Ayan – mastering
- Derek Branson – digital editing, engineer, mixing
- Mark Bright – producer
- Desmond Child – production
- Jeremy Cowart – photography
- Mike "Frog" Griffith – production coordination
- Charlie Judge – programming
- Frank Rogers – production
- Chris Small – assistant engineer, digital editing
- Kirsten Wines – production assistant

== Charts ==
=== Weekly charts ===
Chart (2014)	Peak position
Australian Albums (ARIA)	49
Canadian Albums (Billboard)	15
UK Country Compilation Albums (OCC)	1
US Billboard 200	4
US Top Country Albums (Billboard)	1

=== Year-end charts ===
Chart (2015)	Position
Australian Country Albums (ARIA)	27
US Billboard 200	28
US Top Country Albums (Billboard)	7
Chart (2016)	Position
US Billboard 200	98
US Top Country Albums (Billboard)	25
Chart (2017)	Position
US Top Country Albums (Billboard)	35
Chart (2018)	Position
US Top Country Albums (Billboard)	26
Chart (2019)	Position
US Top Country Albums (Billboard)	67
Chart (2020)	Position
US Top Country Albums (Billboard)	52
Chart (2021)	Position
US Top Country Albums (Billboard)	31
Chart (2023)	Position
US Top Country Albums (Billboard)	37
Chart (2024)	Position
US Top Country Albums (Billboard)	59

== Certifications ==
Region	Certification	Certified units/sales
United Kingdom (BPI)	Gold	100,000^{‡}
United States (RIAA)	Platinum	564,300
^{‡} Sales+streaming figures based on certification alone.
