= Shania Twain videography =

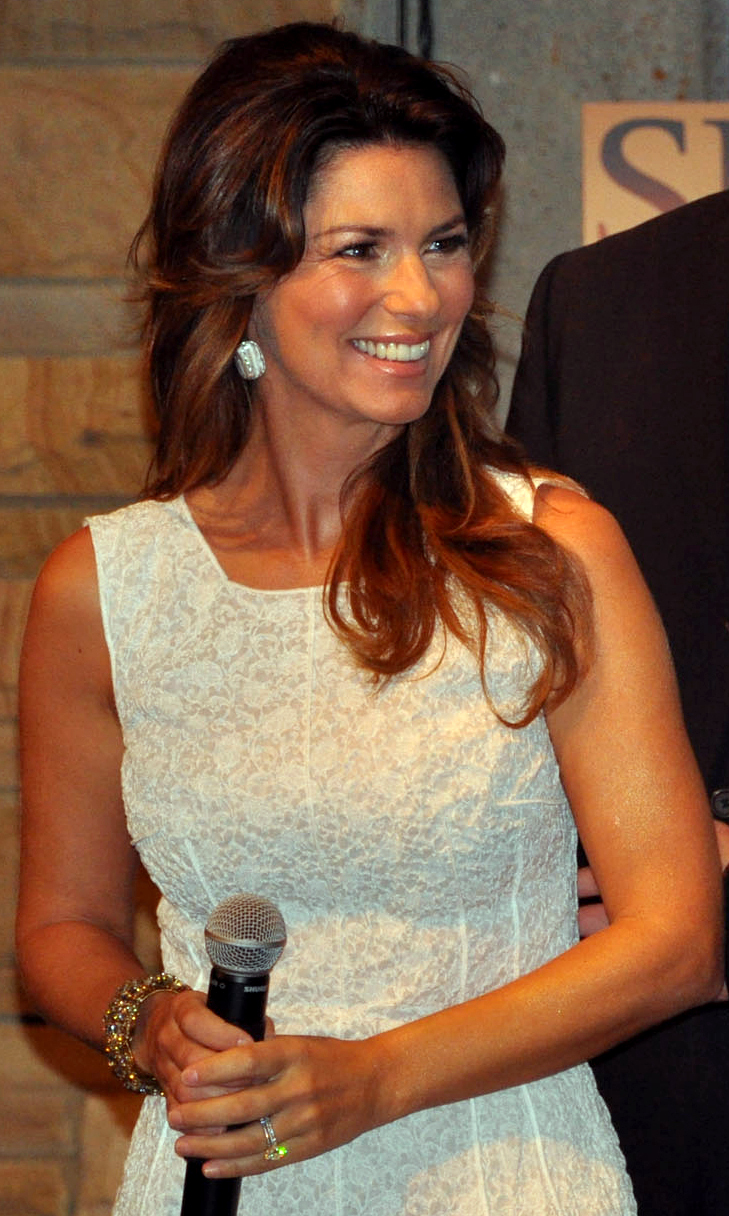
Twain in 2011

This is a list of music videos by Canadian singer Shania Twain. It contains all 41 music videos, with their respective directors, filming locations, release dates and alternate versions for each video.

Billboard listed Twain as the "13th Best Music Video Female Artist of all time (42nd overall)". Her music videos also became an inspiration to some of her contemporaries like Halsey and Harry Styles.

With the exception of "When", which was released exclusively to the United Kingdom, all of the videos released from the albums Shania Twain (1993), The Woman in Me (1995) and Come On Over (1997) are available on Twain's DVD The Platinum Collection. Videos from the albums Up! (2002) and Greatest Hits (2004) are available on select enhanced CD singles and a special DVD-Audio version of Up!. Videos from the albums Now (2017) and Queen of Me (2023) are commercially unavailable. Many of Twain's music videos have won various awards.

== Music videos ==
Song/Album	Information	Versions
"What Made You Say That"; Shania Twain	Director: Steven Goldmann; Location: Miami Beach, U.S. Filmed: January 12, 1993; Released: February 5, 1993	*Album Version
"Dance with the One That Brought You"; Shania Twain	Director: Sean Penn; Location: Los Angeles, U.S. Filmed: May 2, 1993; Released: May 24, 1993	*Album Version
"You Lay a Whole Lot of Love on Me"; Shania Twain	Director: Steven Goldmann; Location: Montreal, Quebec, Canada; Filmed: August 19 & 20, 1993; Released: September 7, 1993	*Album Version
"Whose Bed Have Your Boots Been Under?"; The Woman in Me	Director: John Derek; Location: Santa Ynez, U.S. Filmed: December 19 to 21, 1994; Released: January 11, 1995	*Album Version
"Any Man of Mine"; The Woman in Me	Director: John Derek & Charley Randazzo; Location: Santa Ynez, U.S. Filmed: February 23, 1995; Released: April 26, 1995	*Video Version; *Alternate Mix
"The Woman in Me (Needs the Man in You)"; The Woman in Me	Director: Markus Blunder; Location: Cairo/Saqqara, Egypt; Filmed: July 1995; Released: August 9, 1995	*Album Version; *Steel Guitarless Mix
"(If You're Not in It for Love) I'm Outta Here!"; The Woman in Me	Director: Steven Goldmann; Location: New York City, U.S. Filmed: November 4, 1995; Released: November 15, 1995	*Album Version; *Mutt Lange Mix; *Dance Mix
"You Win My Love"; The Woman in Me	Director: Steven Goldmann; Location: Orlando, U.S. Filmed: January 14 & 15, 1996; Released: January 27, 1996	*Album Version; *Mutt Lange Mix
"No One Needs to Know"; The Woman in Me	Director: Steven Goldmann; Location: Spring Hill, U.S. Filmed: April 3, 1996; Released: May 15, 1996	*Album Version (Performance Only); *Album Version (Twister Version)
"Home Ain't Where His Heart Is (Anymore)"; The Woman in Me	Director: Steven Goldmann; Location: Montreal, Quebec, Canada; Filmed: July 9, 1996; Released: July 24, 1996	*Album Version
"God Bless the Child"; The Woman in Me	Director: Larry Jordan; Location: Nashville, U.S. Filmed: October 3, 1996; Released: October 26, 1996	*Single Mix (With Banjo); *Single Mix (Without Banjo)
"Love Gets Me Every Time"; Come On Over	Director: Timothy White; Location: New York City, U.S. Filmed: September 3, 1997; Released: September 24, 1997	*Original Album Version
"Don't Be Stupid (You Know I Love You)"; Come On Over	Director: Larry Jordan; Location: New York City, U.S. Filmed: October 18 & 19, 1997; Released: November 12, 1997	*Original Album Version; *Dance Mix; *International Album Version
"You're Still the One"; Come On Over	Director: David Hogan; Location: Malibu & Los Angeles, U.S. Filmed: December 4 & 5, 1997; Released: January 26, 1998	*Original Album Version (Black & White); *International Album Version (Black & White); *Original Album Version Radio Edit (Black & White); *International Single Mix (Black & White); *Original Album Version (Blue Tint); *International Album Version (Blue Tint); *Original Album Version Radio Edit (Blue Tint); *International Single Mix (Blue Tint)
"When"; Come On Over	Director: Markus Blunder; Location: New York City, U.S. Released: August 1998	*Original Album Version; *International Album Version
"Honey, I'm Home"; Come On Over	Director: Larry Jordan; Location: Louisville, U.S. Filmed: July 8, 1998; Released: August 19, 1998	*Live (dubbed with Original Album Version); *Live (dubbed with International Single Mix)
"From This Moment On"; Come On Over	Director: Paul Boyd; Location: New York City, U.S. Filmed: August 27, 1998; Released: September 27, 1998	*The Right Mix Radio Edit
"That Don't Impress Me Much"; Come On Over	Director: Paul Boyd; Location: El Mirage/Barstow, U.S. Filmed: November 3 & 4, 1998; Released: December 2, 1998	*Original Album Version; *Dance Mix Edit
"Man! I Feel Like a Woman!"; Come On Over	Director: Paul Boyd; Location: New York City, U.S. Filmed: January 11, 1999; Released: March 3, 1999	*Original Album Version; *Alternate Mix; *International Album Version
"You've Got a Way"; Come On Over	Director: Paul Boyd; Location: Los Angeles, U.S. Filmed: May 2, 1999; Released: May 24, 1999	*Original Album Version; *Original Album Version (All Performance); *Notting Hill Remix; *Notting Hill Remix (All Performance)
"Come on Over"; Come On Over	Director: Larry Jordan; Location: Dallas, U.S. Filmed: September 12, 1998; Released: October 6, 1999	*Live
"Rock This Country!"; Come On Over	Director: Larry Jordan; Location: Dallas, U.S. Filmed: November 25, 1999; Released: December 23, 1999	*Live
"I'm Gonna Getcha Good!"; Up!	Director: Paul Boyd; Location: London, UK; Filmed: August 22 & 23, 2002; Released: October 4, 2002	*Red Radio Edit; *Green Radio Edit; *Red Radio Edit (SFX Edit); *Green Radio Edit (SFX Edit); *Blue Album Version (SFX Edit); *Red Album Version (All Performance)
"Up!"; Up!	Director: Antti J Location: Madrid, Spain; Filmed: January 2003; Released: January 11, 2003	*Red Album Version; *Green Album Version; *Blue Album Version
"Ka-Ching!"; Up!	Director: Antti J Location: Madrid, Spain & Mexico City; Filmed: January 2003; Released: February 25, 2003	*Red Album Version; *Red (Silver Outfit Version); *Red (Red Dress Version)
"Forever and for Always"; Up!	Director: Paul Boyd; Location: Bethells Beach, New Zealand; Filmed: March 2003; Released: April 26, 2003	*Red Radio Edit; *Green Radio Edit; *Blue Radio Edit; *Red Radio Edit (All Performance); *Green Radio Edit (All Performance)
"Thank You Baby! (for Makin' Someday Come So Soon)"; Up!	Director: Paul Boyd; Location: Vancouver, British Columbia, Canada; Released: July 28, 2003	*Red Album Version
"When You Kiss Me"; Up!	Director: Paul Boyd; Location: Takapuna, New Zealand; Filmed: March 2003; Released: October 17, 2003	*Red Album Version; *Red (One Take Version)
"She's Not Just a Pretty Face"; Up!	Director: Beth McCarthy-Miller; Location: Chicago, U.S. Filmed: July 27, 2003; Released: October 24, 2003	*Live (Red Album Version)
"It Only Hurts When I'm Breathing"; Up!	Director: Beth McCarthy-Miller; Location: Chicago, U.S. Filmed: July 27, 2003; Released: February 13, 2004	*Live (Green Album Version)
"Party for Two"; Greatest Hits	Director: Marcus Raboy; Location: London, UK; Filmed: August 28 & 29, 2004; Released: September 27, 2004	*Country Version with Billy Currington; *Pop Version with Mark McGrath
"Don't!"; Greatest Hits	Director: Wayne Isham; Location: Oaxaca, Mexico; Filmed: October 24, 2004; Released: December 30, 2004	*Album Version
"I Ain't No Quitter"; Greatest Hits	Director: Wayne Isham; Location: Tijuana, Mexico; Filmed: March 2005; Released: May 5, 2005	*Album Version
"Today Is Your Day"	Released: June 23, 2011	*Album Version
"Endless Love"; Tuskegee	Director: Paul Boyd; Location: The Bahamas; Filmed: February 2012; Released: March 23, 2012	*Album Version
"Man! I Feel Like a Woman!"; Still the One: Live from Vegas	Director: Mark D. Allen; Released: February 20, 2015	*Live
"Life's About to Get Good"; Now	Director: Matthew Cullen; Location: Dominican Republic; Filmed: June 2017; Released: July 27, 2017	*Album Version
"Swingin' with My Eyes Closed"; Now	Released: September 29, 2017	*Album Version
"Soldier"; Now	Released: July 2, 2018	*Album Version
"Waking Up Dreaming"; Queen of Me	Director: Isaac Rentz; Location: Toronto, Canada; Filmed: August 2022; Released: September 23, 2022	*Album Version
"Giddy Up!" Queen of Me	Released: January 23, 2023	*Album Version

== Video albums ==
Year	Title	US certification
1995	The Woman in Me: Released: September 26, 1995	Platinum
1996	The Complete Woman in Me Video Collection: Released: November 19, 1996	Platinum
1999	VH1 Behind the Music: Shania Twain: Released: March 2, 1999	Platinum
1999	Live: Released: May 11, 1999	Platinum
1999	Come On Over: Video Collection: Released: November 9, 1999	Platinum
2001	The Platinum Collection: Released: November 6, 2001	Platinum
2001	The Specials/Live in Miami: Released: November 20, 2001	
2002	A Collection of Video Hits: Released: November 2002	
2003	Up! Live in Chicago: Released: November 18, 2003	Platinum
2004	Up! Close and Personal: Released: November 9, 2004	Platinum
2015	Still the One: Live from Vegas: Released: March 3, 2015	
