= Shania Twain Live =

Live

Video by Shania Twain
- Released: December 7, 1999
- Recorded: September 12, 1998
- Venue: Reunion Arena (Dallas, Texas)
- Genre: Country; Pop
- Length: 119:25
- Label: Mercury Nashville
- Director: Lawrence Jordan
- Producer: Jon Landau (exec.); Barbara Carr (exec.); Lee Rolontz; Jack Gulick; George Travis

Shania Twain chronology
VH1 Behind the Music (1999)	Live (1999)	Come on Over Video Collection (1999)

Shania Twain: Live is a TV concert special released by singer Shania Twain from her Come On Over Tour. Released on VHS and DVD, it was filmed on September 12, 1998, in Dallas, Texas, and aired live on DirecTV for free. The music video for Twain's single "Come On Over" was taken from this special. The video was certified platinum by the RIAA in 1999.

Shania Twain: Live was also released in Australia in 1999, but only on the VHS format.

== Setlist ==
No.	Title	Length
1.	"Man! I Feel Like a Woman!"
2.	"Honey, I'm Home"
3.	"You Win My Love"
4.	"Whose Bed Have Your Boots Been Under?"
5.	"You're Still the One"
6.	"I Won't Leave You Lonely"
7.	"Come on Over"
8.	"Love Gets Me Every Time"
9.	"I'm Holdin' on to Love (to Save My Life)"
10.	"When"
11.	"Medley: Home Ain't Where His Heart Is (Anymore)"/"The Woman in Me (Needs the Man in You)"/"You've Got a Way"
12.	"That Don't Impress Me Much"
13.	"If It Don't Take Two"
14.	"Black Eyes, Blue Tears"
15.	"God Bless the Child"
16.	"To Daddy"
17.	"What Made You Say That"
18.	"No One Needs to Know"
19.	"Any Man of Mine"
20.	"Don't Be Stupid (You Know I Love You)"
21.	"From This Moment On"
22.	"(If You're Not in It for Love) I'm Outta Here!"
23.	"Any Man of Mine" (reprise)
24.	"Rock This Country!"

== Personnel ==
- Marc Muller – Lap steel guitar, pedal steel guitar
- Randall Waller – Guitar
- Andy Cichon – Bass guitar
- Brent Barcus – Guitar
- Allison Cornell – Fiddle, mandolin, keyboards
- Roddy Chiong – Fiddle, guitar, mandolin
- Hardy Hemphill – Keyboards, harmonica, percussion
- JD Blair – Drums
- Cory Churko – Guitar, mandolin, fiddle
- Marcus High School Drumline

== Certifications and sales ==
Region	Certification	Certified units/sales
Brazil (Pro-Música Brasil)	Gold	25,000^{*}
United Kingdom (BPI)	2× Platinum	100,000^{*}
United States (RIAA)	Platinum	100,000^{^}
^{*} Sales figures based on certification alone.^{^} Shipments figures based on certification alone.
