= List of awards and nominations received by Shania Twain =

Shania Twain awards and nominations
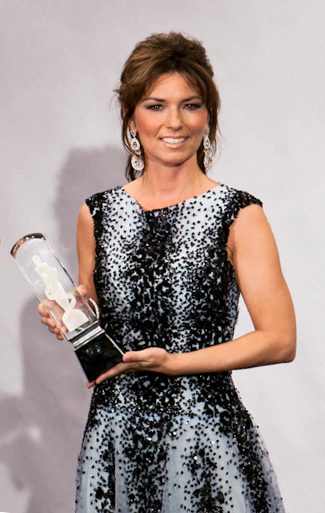
- Twain at the 2011 Juno Awards
Awards and nominations
Award	Wins	Nominations
American Music Awards	6	17
Billboard	11	21
CMT	3	6
Echo	1	1
Grammy	5	18
Juno	13	30
Much	3	3
People's Choice	3	3
World Music	2	2
Academy of Country Music Awards	5	7

Totals (Note: Certain award groups do not simply award one winner. They acknowledge several different recipients, have runners-up, and have third place. Since this is a specific recognition and is different from losing an award, runner-up mentions are considered wins in this award tally. For simplification and to avoid errors, each award in this list has been presumed to have had a prior nomination.)
- Wins: 224

Canadian singer Shania Twain has been honored numerous times since her debut. Her self-titled debut studio album Shania Twain (1993), was certified platinum by the RIAA. Her follow up The Woman In Me (1995), sold over 12 million copies in the US (Diamond) and 20 million copies worldwide. Twain's third studio album Come On Over (1997), is the best selling album in country music history and the best selling album of all time by a female artist in any genre, having sold over 40 million copies worldwide and being certified 2× Diamond in the US. Her fourth release Up! (2002), was also certified Diamond in the US. In 2003, she was the only female artist to have 3 consecutive albums certified Diamond in the US. Afterwards, Twain released her Greatest Hits (2004) package, which was certified 4× platinum in the US. Thirteen years later, she released her fifth studio album Now (2017), and it was certified platinum in the US. The following is a list of awards Twain has won throughout her career. In total, she has won 224 awards.

== Academy of Country Music Awards ==
Year	Nominated work / Recipient	Category	Result
1996	Shania Twain	Top New Female Vocalist	Won
1996	Shania Twain	Top Female Vocalist	Nominated
1996	The Woman in Me	Album of the Year	Won
1996	"Any Man of Mine"	Single Record of the Year	Nominated
1997	Shania Twain	Top Female Vocalist	Nominated
1998	Come On Over	Album of the Year	Nominated
1999	Shania Twain	Entertainer of the Year	Nominated
1999	Shania Twain	Top Female Vocalist	Nominated
1999	"You're Still The One"	Single Record of the Year	Nominated
1999	The Woman In Me and Come On Over	Double-Diamond Award	Won
2000	Shania Twain	Top Female Vocalist	Nominated
2000	Shania Twain	Entertainer of the Year	Won
2003	Shania Twain	Top Female Vocalist	Nominated
2004	Shania Twain	Top Female Vocalist	Nominated
2005	"Party for Two" (with Billy Currington)	Vocal Event of the Year	Nominated
2022	Shania Twain	Poet's Award	Won

== American Music Awards ==
Year	Nominated work / Recipient	Category	Result
1996	Shania Twain	Favorite Country New Artist	Won
1996	Shania Twain	Favorite Country Female Artist	Nominated
1996	The Woman in Me	Favorite Country Album	Nominated
1997	Shania Twain	Favorite Country Female Artist	Won
1997	The Woman in Me	Favorite Country Album	Nominated
1998	Shania Twain	Favorite Country Female Artist	Nominated
1999	Shania Twain	Artist of the Year	Nominated
1999	Shania Twain	Favorite Pop/Rock Female Artist	Nominated
1999	Shania Twain	Favorite Country Female Artist	Won
1999	Shania Twain	Favorite Adult Contemporary Artist	Nominated
1999	Come On Over	Favorite Pop/Rock Album	Nominated
1999	Come On Over	Favorite Country Album	Nominated
2000	Shania Twain	Favorite Pop/Rock Female Artist	Won
2000	Shania Twain	Favorite Country Female Artist	Won
2000	Shania Twain	Favorite Adult Contemporary Artist	Nominated
2003	Shania Twain	Favorite Country Female Artist	Nominated
2003	Shania Twain	International Artist of the Year	Nominated
2003	Up!	Favorite Country Album	Nominated

== Amigo Awards ==
Year	Nominated work / Recipient	Category	Result
2000	Shania Twain	International Female Artist Of The Year	Nominated

== Bambi Award ==
Year	Nominated work / Recipient	Category	Result
2004	Shania Twain	International Pop Artist of the Year	Won

== Billboard Music Awards ==
Year	Nominated work / Recipient	Category	Result
1996	Shania Twain	Female Country Artist	Won
1996	Shania Twain	Top Country Artist	Nominated
1996	The Woman in Me	Country Album of the Year	Won
1998	Shania Twain	Top Artist	Nominated
1998	Shania Twain	Top Female Artist	Won
1998	Shania Twain	Top Hot 100 Artist	Nominated
1998	Shania Twain	Hot 100 Singles Artist	Won
1998	"You're Still the One"	Top Hot 100 Song	Nominated
1998	"You're Still the One"	Best Selling Country Single	Won
1998	"You're Still the One"	Best Country Clip	Won
1998	Come On Over	Top Country Album	Nominated
1999	Shania Twain Twain	Top Female Artist	Nominated
1999	Shania Twain Twain	Top Artist	Nominated
1999	Come On Over	Top Billboard 200 Album	Nominated
2000	Come On Over	Top Country Album	Nominated
2003	Shania Twain	Top Country Artist	Won
2003	Shania Twain	Top Female Country Artist	Won
2003	Shania Twain	Top Country Album Artist	Won
2003	Up!	Top Billboard 200 Album	Nominated
2003	Up!	Top Country Album	Won
2005	Greatest Hits	Country Album of the Year	Won

== BMI Songwriter Awards ==
Year	Nominated work / Recipient	Category	Result
1996	"Any Man of Mine"	One of the Most Performed Songs of the Year (Country)	Won
1996	"Any Man of Mine"	One of the Most Performed Songs of the Year (Pop)	Won
1996	"Whose Bed Have Your Boots Been Under?"	One of the Most Performed Songs of the Year (Country)	Won
1996	"(If You're Not in It for Love) I'm Outta Here!"	One of the Most Performed Songs of the Year (Country)	Won
1997	"Any Man of Mine"	One of the Most Performed Songs of the Year (Pop)	Won
1997	"No One Needs To Know"	One of the Most Performed Songs of the Year (Country)	Won
1998	"Love Gets Me Every Time"	One of the Most Performed Songs of the Year (Country)	Won
1999	Shania Twain	Country Songwriter of the Year	Won
1999	Shania Twain	Pop Songwriter of the Year	Won
1999	"You're Still the One"	One of the Most Performed Songs of the Year (Country)	Won
1999	"You're Still the One"	One of the Most Performed Songs of the Year (Pop)	Won
1999	"You're Still the One"	Song of the Year (Country)	Won
1999	"You're Still the One"	Song of the Year (Pop)	Won
1999	"Don't Be Stupid (You Know I Love You)"	One of the Most Performed Songs of the Year (Country)	Won
1999	"From This Moment On"	One of the Most Performed Songs of the Year (Country)	Won
1999	"From This Moment On"	One of the Most Performed Songs of the Year (Pop)	Won
1999	"Honey, I'm Home"	One of the Most Performed Songs of the Year (Country)	Won
1999	"Love Gets Me Every Time"	One of the Most Performed Songs of the Year (Pop)	Won
2000	Shania Twain	Country Songwriter of the Year	Won
2000	Shania Twain	Pop Songwriter of the Year	Won
2000	"You're Still the One"	One of the Most Performed Songs of the Year (Pop)	Won
2000	"From This Moment On"	One of the Most Performed Songs of the Year (Pop)	Won
2000	"That Don't Impress Me Much"	One of the Most Performed Songs of the Year (Country)	Won
2000	"That Don't Impress Me Much"	One of the Most Performed Songs of the Year (Pop)	Won
2000	"Man! I Feel Like A Woman"	One of the Most Performed Songs of the Year (Country)	Won
2000	"Man! I Feel Like A Woman"	One of the Most Performed Songs of the Year (Pop)	Won
2000	"Come On Over"	One of the Most Performed Songs of the Year (Country)	Won
2000	"You've Got A Way"	One of the Most Performed Songs of the Year (Pop)	Won
2001	"You've Got A Way"	One of the Most Performed Songs of the Year (Country)	Won
2003	"I'm Gonna Getcha Good"	One of the Most Performed Songs of the Year (Country)	Won
2004	"Forever and For Always"	Song of the Year	Won
2004	"Forever and For Always"	Song of the Year (Europe)	Won
2004	"Forever and For Always"	One of the Most Performed Songs of the Year (Country)	Won
2004	"Forever and For Always"	One of the Most Performed Songs of the Year (Pop)	Won
2004	"I'm Gonna Getcha Good"	One of the Most Performed Songs of the Year (Pop)	Won
2004	"She's Not Just a Pretty Face"	One of the Most Performed Songs of the Year (Country)	Won
2005	"It Only Hurts When I'm Breathing"	One of the Most Performed Songs of the Year (Country)	Won
2005	"Party For Two"	One of the Most Performed Songs of the Year (Country)	Won
2005	"Forever and For Always"	One of the Most Performed Songs of the Year (Pop)	Won

== Country Music Association Awards ==
Year	Nominated work / Recipient	Category	Result
1995	Shania Twain	Female Vocalist of the Year	Nominated
1995	Shania Twain	Horizon Award	Nominated
1995	"Any Man of Mine"	Song of the Year	Nominated
1995	"Any Man of Mine"	Music Video of the Year	Nominated
1996	Shania Twain	Female Vocalist of the Year	Nominated
1996	Shania Twain	Horizon Award	Nominated
1998	Come On Over	Album of the Year	Nominated
1999	Shania Twain	Female Vocalist of the Year	Nominated
1999	Shania Twain	Entertainer of the Year	Won
1999	Shania Twain	CMA International Artist Achievement	Won
2005	Shania Twain	Musical Event of the Year (with Billy Currington)	Nominated

== Canadian Country Music Association Awards ==
Year	Nominated work / Recipient	Category	Result
1993	Shania Twain	Rising Star	Nominated
1993	Shania Twain	Album Design of the Year	Nominated
1993	"What Made You Say That"	Video of the Year	Nominated
1994	Shania Twain	Rising Star	Nominated
1995	Shania Twain	Female Vocalist of the Year	Won
1995	Shania Twain	Songwriter of the Year (for "Whose Bed Have Your Boots Been Under?")	Won
1995	"Whose Bed Have Your Boots Been Under?"	Single of the Year	Nominated
1995	"Whose Bed Have Your Boots Been Under?"	Video of the Year	Nominated
1995	"Any Man of Mine"	Single of the Year	Won
1995	"Any Man of Mine"	Video of the Year	Won
1995	The Woman in Me	Album of the Year	Won
1996	Shania Twain	Female Artist of the Year	Won
1996	Shania Twain	Fan's Choice Award	Won
1996	Shania Twain	Songwriter of the Year (for "(If You're Not in It for Love) I'm Outta Here!")	Nominated
1996	"(If You're Not in It for Love) I'm Outta Here!"	Single of the Year	Nominated
1996	"(If You're Not in It for Love) I'm Outta Here!"	Video of the Year	Won
1996	"(If You're Not in It for Love) I'm Outta Here!"	Video Director of the Year (for Steve Goldman)	Nominated
1996	"You Win My Love"	Video of the Year	Nominated
1996	"You Win My Love"	Video Director of the Year (for Steve Goldman)	Won
1997	The Woman in Me	Top Selling Album of the Year	Won
1997	Shania Twain	Fan Choice Award	Nominated
1997	Shania Twain	Female Artist of the Year	Nominated
1997	Shania Twain	Special Achievement Award	Won
1998	Shania Twain	Fan's Choice Award	Won
1998	Shania Twain	Female Artist of the Year	Won
1998	Shania Twain	Songwriter of the Year (for Don't Be Stupid (You Know I Love You)	Nominated
1998	Shania Twain	All Star Band- Fiddle (for Cory Churko)	Nominated
1998	Shania Twain	Duo of the Year with Bryan White (for From This Moment On)	Nominated
1998	Come On Over	Top Selling Album of the Year	Won
1998	Come On Over	Album of the Year	Won
1998	"Don't Be Stupid (You Know I Love You)"	Video of the Year	Won
1998	"You're Still The One"	Single of the Year	Won
1999	Shania Twain	Fan's Choice Award	Won
1999	Shania Twain	Female Artist of the Year	Won
1999	Shania Twain	Songwriter of the Year (for "That Don't Impress Me Much")	Nominated
1999	Shania Twain	All Star Band- Fiddle (for Cory Churko)	Nominated
1999	Shania Twain	Duo of the Year with Bryan White (for "From This Moment On")	Won
1999	"That Don't Impress Me Much"	Single of the Year	Nominated
1999	"That Don't Impress Me Much"	Video of the Year	Won
2000	Shania Twain	Fan's Choice Award	Nominated
2000	Shania Twain	Female Artist of the Year	Nominated
2000	Shania Twain	Songwriter of the Year (for "Rock This Country")	Nominated
2000	Shania Twain	All Star Band- Fiddle (for Cory Churko)	Nominated
2000	"Rock This Country"	Single of the Year	Nominated
2000	"Rock This Country"	Video of the Year	Nominated
2000	Come On Over	Top Selling Album of the Year	Nominated
2003	Shania Twain	Fan's Choice Award	Nominated
2003	Shania Twain	Female Artist of the Year	Won
2003	Shania Twain	Songwriter of the Year (for "Forever and For Always")	Nominated
2003	Shania Twain	All Star Band- Fiddle (for Cory Churko)	Won
2003	"Forever and For Always"	Single of the Year	Nominated
2003	"Forever and For Always"	Video of the Year	Nominated
2003	Up!	Top Selling Album of the Year	Won
2003	Up!	Album of the Year	Won
2003	"I'm Gonna Getcha Good"	Video of the Year	Won
2004	Shania Twain	Fan's Choice Award	Nominated
2004	Shania Twain	Female Artist of the Year	Nominated
2004	Shania Twain	Songwriter of the Year (for "It Only Hurts When I'm Breathing")	Nominated
2004	Shania Twain	All Star Band- Fiddle (for Cory Churko)	Won
2004	Up! Close and Personal	Country Music Program of the Year	Won
2005	Shania Twain	All Star Band - Fiddle (for Cory Churko)	Nominated
2005	Shania Twain	Female Artist of the Year	Nominated
2005	Greatest Hits	Top Selling Album of the Year	Won
2007	Shania Twain	All Star Band - Fiddle (for Cory Churko)	Nominated
2018	Shania Twain	Apple Music Fan's Choice Award	Won
2018	Shania Twain	Female Artist of the Year	Nominated
2018	Shania Twain	Generation Award	Won
2018	Now	Top Selling Album of the Year	Won
2018	Now	Top Selling Canadian Album of the Year	Won
2023	Shania Twain	Entertainer of the Year	Nominated
2023	Shania Twain	Female Artist of the Year	Nominated

== Danish Music Awards ==
Year	Nominated work / Recipient	Category	Result
2000	"That Don't Impress Me Much"	Foreign Hit Of The Year	Won

== Echo Awards ==
Year	Nominated work / Recipient	Category	Result
2004	Shania Twain	Best International Rock/Pop Female Artist	Won

== Edison Music Awards ==
Year	Nominated work / Recipient	Category	Result
2000	Shania Twain	Best International Female Artist	Won

== Juno Awards ==
Year	Nominated work / Recipient	Category	Result
1994	Shania Twain	Country Female Vocalist of the Year	Nominated
1996	Shania Twain	Country Female Vocalist of the Year	Won
1996	Shania Twain	Female Vocalist of the Year	Nominated
1996	Shania Twain	Songwriter of the Year	Nominated
1996	Shania Twain	Levi's Entertainer of the Year	Won
1996	The Woman in Me	Album of the Year	Nominated
1996	The Woman in Me	Best Selling Album	Nominated
1996	"Any Man of Mine"	Single of the Year	Nominated
1997	Shania Twain	Country Female Vocalist of the Year	Won
1997	Shania Twain	International Achievement Award	Won
1998	Shania Twain	Country Female Vocalist of the Year	Won
1998	Shania Twain	Female Vocalist of the Year	Nominated
1998	Come On Over	Album of the Year	Nominated
1999	Come On Over	Best Selling Album	Nominated
1999	Shania Twain	Best Country Female Vocalist	Won
1999	Shania Twain	Songwriter of the Year (for Don't Be Stupid, You're Still The One, From This Moment On)	Nominated
2000	Shania Twain	Best Country Female Vocalist	Won
2000	Shania Twain	Songwriter of the Year (for Man! I Feel Like A Woman, You've Got A Way, That Don't Impress Me Much)	Won
2001	Shania Twain	Best Female Country Vocalist	Nominated
2003	"I'm Gonna Getcha Good"	Country Recording of the Year	Won
2003	Up!	Album of the Year	Nominated
2003	Shania Twain	Songwriter of the Year ("I'm Gonna Getcha Good")	Nominated
2003	Shania Twain	Artist of the Year	Won
2003	Shania Twain	JUNO Fan Choice Award	Won
2004	Shania Twain	JUNO Fan Choice Award	Nominated
2004	Up!	Country Recording of the Year	Won
2005	"Party For Two"	Country Recording of the Year	Nominated
2005	"Party For Two"	Single of the Year	Nominated
2005	Shania Twain	JUNO Fan Choice Award	Nominated
2011	Shania Twain	Canadian Music Hall of Fame	Won
2018	Now	Album of the Year	Nominated
2018	Shania Twain	Artist of the Year	Nominated
2024	Queen of Me	Pop Album of the Year	Nominated
2024	Shania Twain	Artist of the Year	Nominated

== Grammy Awards ==
Year	Nominated work / Recipient	Category	Result
1996	"Any Man of Mine"	Best Female Country Vocal Performance	Nominated
1996	"Any Man of Mine"	Best Country Song	Nominated
1996	The Woman in Me	Best Country Album	Won
1996	Shania Twain	Best New Artist	Nominated
1999	"You're Still The One"	Record of the Year	Nominated
1999	"You're Still The One"	Song of the Year	Nominated
1999	"You're Still The One"	Best Female Country Vocal Performance	Won
1999	"You're Still The One"	Best Country Song	Won
1999	Come On Over	Album of the Year	Nominated
1999	Come On Over	Best Country Album	Nominated
2000	"Man! I Feel Like A Woman!"	Best Female Country Vocal Performance	Won
2000	"Come On Over"	Best Country Song	Won
2000	"You've Got A Way"	Song of the Year	Nominated
2004	"Forever and For Always"	Best Female Country Vocal Performance	Nominated
2004	"Forever and For Always"	Best Country Song	Nominated
2004	Up!	Best Country Album	Nominated
2005	"Coat of Many Colors"	Best Country Collaboration with Vocals with Alison Krauss & Union Station	Nominated
2005	"She's Not Just A Pretty Face"	Best Female Country Vocal Performance	Nominated

== Ivor Novello Awards ==
Year	Nominee / work	Award	Result
2000	"You're Still The One"	Best Song Musically and Lyrically	Nominated
2000	"That Don't Impress Me Much"	Most Performed Work	Nominated
2000	"That Don't Impress Me Much"	International Hit of the Year	Nominated
2000	"That Don't Impress Me Much"	Best Selling UK Single	Nominated

== MTV Video Music Awards ==
Year	Nominated work / Recipient	Category	Result
1998	"You're Still The One"	Best Female Video	Nominated

== MTV Europe Music Awards ==
Year	Nominated work / Recipient	Category	Result
2023	"Herself"	Best Canadian Act	Won

== NRJ Music Awards ==
Year	Nominated work / Recipient	Category	Result
2001	Shania Twain	International Female Artist of the Year	Nominated
2001	Come On Over	International Album of the Year	Nominated
2003	Shania Twain	International Female Artist of the Year	Nominated
2004	Up!	International Album of the Year	Nominated

== World Music Awards ==
Year	Nominated work / Recipient	Category	Result
1996	Shania Twain	World's Best Selling Female Country Artist	Won
2001	Shania Twain	World's Best Selling Canadian Artist	Won

== Awards by Year ==
=== 1993 ===
- CMT - (Europe): Rising Star

=== 1995 ===
- ABC Radio Networks Country Music Awards: Female Video Artist of the Year
- Canadian Country Music Association Awards (CCMA's): Album of the Year - The Woman in Me
- Canadian Country Music Association Awards (CCMA's): Female Vocalist of the Year
- Canadian Country Music Association Awards (CCMA's): Single of the Year - "Any Man of Mine"
- Canadian Country Music Association Awards (CCMA's): SOCAN Song of the Year - "Whose Bed Have Your Boots Been Under?"
- Canadian Country Music Association Awards (CCMA's): Video of the Year - "Any Man of Mine"
- Country Music Radio Awards: Best Female Artist
- Country Music Radio Awards: Single of the Year - "Any Man of Mine"
- RPM's Big Country Music Awards - (Canada): Outstanding New Artist of the Year

=== 1996 ===
- Academy of Country Music Awards (ACMA's): Album of the Year - The Woman in Me
- Academy of Country Music Awards (ACMA's): Top New Female Vocalist
- American Music Awards (AMA's): Favorite New Country Artist
- AOL Online Music Awards: Hottest Country Video - "Any Man of Mine"
- Billboard Music Awards: Country Album of the Year - The Woman in Me
- Billboard Music Awards: Female Country Artist of the Year
- Blockbuster Entertainment Awards: Favorite New Country Artist
- BMI COUNTRY Songwriter Awards - (U.S.): One of the Most Performed Songs of the Year - "Any Man of Mine"
- BMI COUNTRY Songwriter Awards - (U.S.): One of the Most Performed Songs of the Year - "(If You're Not in It for Love) I'm Outta Here!"
- BMI POP Songwriter Awards - (U.S.): One of the Most Performed Songs of the Year - "Any Man of Mine"
- BMI POP Songwriter Awards - (U.S.): One of the Most Performed Songs of the Year - "Whose Bed Have Your Boots Been Under?"
- Canadian Country Music Association Awards (CCMA's): NCN Fan's Choice Entertainer of the Year
- Canadian Country Music Association Awards (CCMA's): Female Vocalist of the Year
- Canadian Country Music Association Awards (CCMA's): Video of the Year - "(If You're Not in It for Love) I'm Outta Here!"
- CMT - (Canada): Female Video Artist of the Year
- CMT - (Europe): Female Artist of the Year
- CMT - (Europe): Video of the Year - "Any Man of Mine"
- CMT - (U.S.): Female Artist of the Year
- First Americans in the Arts: Outstanding Musical Achievement Award
- Golden Pick Awards: Favorite Album - The Woman In Me
- Golden Pick Awards: Favorite Video - "The Woman in Me (Needs the Man in You)"
- Grammy Awards: Best Country Album - The Woman in Me
- Great British Country Music Awards: International Rising Star
- Jukebox Awards: Country Single of the Year - "Any Man of Mine"
- Jukebox Awards: Songwriter of the Year
- Juno Awards: Country Female Vocalist of the Year
- Juno Awards: Levi's Entertainer of the Year
- Online Music Award: Best New Country Artist
- Radio & Records' Trade Magazine Poll: Best Album - The Woman In Me
- Radio & Records' Trade Magazine Poll: Best Female Vocalist
- Radio & Records' Trade Magazine Poll: Best New Artist
- RPM's Big Country Music Awards - (Canada): Album of the Year - The Woman In Me
- RPM's Big Country Music Awards - (Canada): Canadian Country Artist of the Year
- RPM's Big Country Music Awards - (Canada): Female Artist of the Year
- RPM's Big Country Music Awards - (Canada): Song of the Year - "Any Man of Mine"
- RPM's Big Country Music Awards - (Canada): Songwriters of the Year - Shania Twain and R.J. "Mutt" Lange
- SOCAN Awards: One of the Most Performed Songs of the Year - "Any Man of Mine"
- SOCAN Awards: One of the Most Performed Songs of the Year - "Whose Bed Have Your Boots Been Under?"
- World Music Awards: World's Best Selling Female Country Artist

=== 1997 ===
- American Music Awards (AMA's): Favorite Female Country Artist
- BMI COUNTRY Songwriter Awards - (U.S.): One of the Most Performed Songs of the Year - "No One Needs to Know"
- BMI POP Songwriter Awards - (U.S.): One of the Most Performed Songs of the Year - "Any Man of Mine"
- Canadian Country Music Association Awards (CCMA's): Special Achievement Award - The Woman in Me (Top selling album by a female country artist ever, selling over 12 million copies worldwide)
- Canadian Country Music Association Awards (CCMA's): Top Selling Album - The Woman In Me
- Juno Awards: Country Female Vocalist of the Year
- Juno Awards: Juno International Achievement Award
- RPM's Big Country Music Awards - (Canada): Songwriters of the Year - Shania Twain and R.J. "Mutt" Lange
- SOCAN Awards: One of the Most Performed Songs of the Year - "(If You're Not in It for Love) I'm Outta Here!"
- SOCAN Awards: One of the Most Performed Songs of the Year - "No One Needs to Know"

=== 1998 ===
- Billboard Music Awards: Best Selling Country Single - "You're Still the One"
- Billboard Music Awards: Female Artist of the Year (All categories)
- Billboard Music Awards: Hot 100 Singles Female Artist
- Billboard Music Video Awards: Best Country Clip - You're Still The One
- BMI COUNTRY Songwriter Awards - (U.S.): One of the Most Performed Songs of the Year - "Love Gets Me Every Time"
- Canadian Country Music Association Awards (CCMA's): CMT Maple Leaf Foods Fan's Choice Award - Entertainer of the Year
- Canadian Country Music Association Awards (CCMA's): Female Vocalist of the Year
- Canadian Country Music Association Awards (CCMA's): Album of the Year - Come on Over
- Canadian Country Music Association Awards (CCMA's): Single of the Year - "You're Still the One"
- Canadian Country Music Association Awards (CCMA's): Top Selling Album - Come on Over
- Canadian Country Music Association Awards (CCMA's): Video of the Year - "Don't Be Stupid (You Know I Love You)"
- CMT - (Canada): Female Video Artist of the Year
- CMT - (Latin America): Female Artist of the Year
- CMT - (Latin America): Video of the Year - "You're Still the One"
- CMT - (Pacific): Female Artist of the Year
- CMT - (U.S.): Female Artist of the Year
- Juno Awards: Country Female Vocalist of the Year
- MTV Video Music Awards: Nominated for Female Video of the Year - "You're Still the One"
- Nashville Songwriters Association International (NSAI): Songwriter/Artist of the Year
- RPM's Big Country Music Awards - (Canada): Album of the Year - Come on Over
- RPM's Big Country Music Awards - (Canada): Canadian Country Artist of the Year
- VH1 Viewer's Choice Awards: Sexiest Video - "You're Still the One"

=== 1999 ===
- Academy of Country Music Awards (ACMA's): Double-Diamond Award - The Woman in Me and Come on Over
  - (Back to back albums selling over 10 million copies each in the U.S.)
- American Music Awards (AMA's): Favorite Female Country Artist
- APRA Music Awards: Most Performed Foreign Work – "You're Still the One"
- Blockbuster Entertainment Awards: Favorite Female Country Artist
- Blockbuster Entertainment Awards: Favorite Single - "You're Still the One
- BMI COUNTRY Songwriter Awards - (U.S.): Country Songwriter of the Year
- BMI COUNTRY Songwriter Awards - (U.S.): Song of the Year - "You're Still the One"
- BMI COUNTRY Songwriter Awards - (U.S.): One of the Most Performed Songs of the Year - "You're Still the One"
- BMI COUNTRY Songwriter Awards - (U.S.): One of the Most Performed Songs of the Year - "Don't Be Stupid (You Know I Love You)"
- BMI COUNTRY Songwriter Awards - (U.S.): One of the Most Performed Songs of the Year - "From This Moment On"
- BMI COUNTRY Songwriter Awards - (U.S.): One of the Most Performed Songs of the Year - "Honey, I'm Home"
- BMI POP Songwriter Awards - (U.S.): Pop Songwriter of the Year
- BMI POP Songwriter Awards - (U.S.): Song of the Year - "You're Still the One"
- BMI POP Songwriter Awards - (U.S.): One of the Most Performed Songs of the Year - "You're Still the One"
- BMI POP Songwriter Awards - (U.S.): One of the Most Performed Songs of the Year - "From This Moment On"
- BMI POP Songwriter Awards - (U.S.): One of the Most Performed Songs of the Year - "Love Gets Me Every Time"
- Canadian Country Music Association Awards (CCMA's): CMT Maple Leaf Foods Fan's Choice Award - Entertainer of the Year
- Canadian Country Music Association Awards (CCMA's): Female Vocalist of the Year
- Canadian Country Music Association Awards (CCMA's): Video of the Year - "That Don't Impress Me Much"
- Canadian Country Music Association Awards (CCMA's): Vocal/Instrumental Collaboration of the Year - "From This Moment On"
- Country Music Association Awards (CMA's) - (U.S.): CMA International Artist Achievement
- Country Music Association Awards (CMA's) - (U.S.): Entertainer of the Year
- CMT - (U.S.): Female Artist of the Year
- Gazette Net Country Awards: Most Popular Female Artist
- Grammy Awards - (U.S.): Best Country Song - "You're Still the One"
- Grammy Awards - (U.S.): Best Female Country Vocal Performance - "You're Still the One"
- Juno Awards: Best Country Female Vocalist
- Modern Screen Magazine's Readers Ballot Awards: Favorite Female Vocalist
- National Association of Record Merchandisers (NARM): Best Selling Country Record of the Year - Come on Over
- Playboy's Reader Poll: Best Country Album - Come on Over
- Playboy's Reader Poll: Female Country Artist of the Year
- Radio & Records Magazine: Female Country Artist of the Year
- RPM's Big Country Music Awards - (Canada): Canadian Country Artist of the Year
- RPM's Big Country Music Awards - (Canada): Female Vocalist of the Year
- SOCAN Awards: One of the Most Performed Songs of the Year - "Don't Be Stupid (You Know I Love You)"
- SOCAN Awards: One of the Most Performed Songs of the Year - "From This Moment On"
- SOCAN Awards: One of the Most Performed Songs of the Year - "You're Still the One"
- WB Radio Music Awards: Country/Young Country Artist of the Year
- Yahoo! Internet Life Online Music Awards: Favorite Country Artist

=== 2000 ===
- Academy of Country Music Awards (ACMA's): Entertainer of the Year
- American Music Awards (AMA's): Favorite Female Country Artist
- American Music Awards (AMA's): Favorite Female Pop/Rock Artist
- Blockbuster Entertainment Awards: Favorite Female Country Artist
- BMI COUNTRY Songwriter Awards - (U.S.): Country Songwriter of the Year
- BMI COUNTRY Songwriter Awards - (U.S.): One of the Most Performed Songs of the Year - "Come on Over"
- BMI COUNTRY Songwriter Awards - (U.S.): One of the Most Performed Songs of the Year - "Man! I Feel Like a Woman!"
- BMI COUNTRY Songwriter Awards - (U.S.): One of the Most Performed Songs of the Year - "That Don't Impress Me Much"
- BMI POP Songwriter Awards - (U.S.): Pop Songwriter of the Year
- BMI POP Songwriter Awards - (U.S.): One of the Most Performed Songs of the Year - "You're Still the One"
- BMI POP Songwriter Awards - (U.S.): One of the Most Performed Songs of the Year - "From This Moment On"
- BMI POP Songwriter Awards - (U.S.): One of the Most Performed Songs of the Year - "Man! I Feel Like a Woman!"
- BMI POP Songwriter Awards - (U.S.): One of the Most Performed Songs of the Year - "That Don't Impress Me Much"
- BMI POP Songwriter Awards - (U.S.): One of the Most Performed Songs of the Year - "You've Got a Way"
- Edison Awards - (Netherlands): Best International Female Artist
- Grammy Awards - (U.S.): Best Country Song - "Come on Over"
- Grammy Awards - (U.S.): Best Female Country Vocal Performance - "Man! I Feel Like a Woman!"
- Grammy Awards - (Danish): Best Foreign Hit - "That Don't Impress Me Much"
- Juno Awards: Best Country Female Artist
- Juno Awards: Best Songwriter
- M6 Awards - (France): Best International Female Artist
- MuchMusic Video Awards - (Canada): MuchMoreMusic Video Award - "Man! I Feel Like a Woman!"
- People's Choice Awards - (U.S.): Favorite Female Musical Performer
- Playboy's Reader Poll: Female Country Artist of the Year
- Radio & Records' Trade Magazine Poll: Performer of the Year
- RPM's Big Country Music Awards - (Canada): Album of the Year - Come on Over
- RPM's Big Country Music Awards - (Canada): Song of the Year - "Man! I Feel Like a Woman!"
- SOCAN Awards: One of the Most Performed Songs of the Year - "From This Moment On"
- SOCAN Awards: One of the Most Performed Songs of the Year - "Man! I Feel Like a Woman!"
- SOCAN Awards: One of the Most Performed Songs of the Year - "That Don't Impress Me Much"
- SOCAN Awards: One of the Most Performed Songs of the Year - "You're Still the One"
- SOCAN Awards: One of the Most Performed Songs of the Year - "You've Got a Way"

=== 2001 ===
- BMI COUNTRY Songwriter Awards - (U.S.): One of the Most Performed Songs of the Year - "You've Got a Way"
- World Music Awards: World's Best Selling Canadian Artist

=== 2002 ===
- CMT's 40 Greatest Women In Country Music' Ranked #7.

=== 2003 ===
- Billboard Music Awards: Female Country Artist of the Year
- Billboard Music Awards: Country Artist of the Year
- Billboard Music Awards: Country Album of the Year - Up!
- Billboard Music Awards: Country Albums Artist of the Year
- BMI COUNTRY Songwriter Awards - (U.S.): One of the Most Performed Songs of the Year - "I'm Gonna Getcha Good!"
- Canadian Country Music Association Awards (CCMA's): Female Artist of the Year
- Canadian Country Music Association Awards (CCMA's): Video of the Year - "I'm Gonna Getcha Good!"
- Canadian Country Music Association Awards (CCMA's): Top Selling Album - Up!
- Canadian Country Music Association Awards (CCMA's): Album of the Year - Up!
- CMT Flameworthy Awards - (U.S.): Concept Video of the Year - "I'm Gonna Getcha Good!"
- Juno Awards: Country Recording of the Year - "I'm Gonna Getcha Good!"
- Juno Awards: Artist of the Year
- Juno Awards: Fan's Choice Award
- MuchMusic Video Awards - (Canada): MuchMoreMusic Video Award - "Up!"
- Radio & Records Magazine: Top Female Country Airplay Artist of the Year
- Roughstock Awards: Female Artist of the Year
- Sky Radio Airplay Award - (Holland): Sky Radio Airplay Award
- VIVA Comet Awards - (Germany): Best International Act

=== 2004 ===
- Bambi Awards - (Germany): International Pop Artist of the Year
- BMI COUNTRY Songwriter Awards - (U.S.): Song of the Year - "Forever and for Always"
- BMI COUNTRY Songwriter Awards - (U.S.): One of the Most Performed Songs of the Year - "Forever and for Always"
- BMI COUNTRY Songwriter Awards - (U.S.): One of the Most Performed Songs of the Year - "She's Not Just a Pretty Face"
- BMI POP Songwriter Awards - (U.S.): One of the Most Performed Songs of the Year - "Forever and for Always"
- BMI POP Songwriter Awards - (U.S.): One of the Most Performed Songs of the Year - "I'm Gonna Getcha Good!"
- BMI Songwriter Awards - (Europe): Song of the Year - "Forever and for Always"
- Canadian Country Music Awards (CCMA's): Country Music Program or Special of the Year - Up! Close and Personal
- Canadian Radio Music Awards: Songwriter Award
- Canadian Radio Music Awards: "Chart Topper" Award
- CMA Awards - (France): Best Live Performer
- CMT Flameworthy Awards - (U.S.): Female Video of the Year - "Forever and for Always"
- ECHO Awards - (Germany): Best International Female Artist
- Juno Awards: Country Recording of the Year - "Up!"

=== 2005 ===
- Billboard Music Awards: Album of the year - Greatest Hits
- Order of Canada: Officer
- BMI COUNTRY Songwriter Awards - (U.S.): One of the Most Performed Songs of the Year - "Party for Two"
- BMI COUNTRY Songwriter Awards - (U.S.): One of the Most Performed Songs of the Year - "It Only Hurts When I'm Breathing"
- BMI POP Songwriter Awards - (U.S.): One of the Most Performed Songs of the Year - "Forever and for Always"
- Canadian Country Music Association Awards (CCMA's): Top Selling Album - Greatest Hits
- Canadian Radio Music Awards: "Chart Topper" Award
- MuchMusic Video Awards - (Canada): MuchMoreMusic Video Award - "Party for Two"
- People's Choice Awards - (U.S.): Favorite Country Female Singer

=== 2006 ===
- Canadian Radio Music Awards: "Chart Topper" Awards

=== 2008 ===
- Billboard Hot-100 50th Anniversary
  - The Billboard Hot 100 All-Time Top Songs ranked #66 for "You're Still The One"
  - Top Billboard Hot 100 Country Songs ranked #3 for "You're Still The One"
  - Songs With The Most Weeks at No. 2 Without Reaching No. 1 ranked #4 for "You're Still The One"

=== 2015 ===
- Taste of Country Fan Choice Awards - Who had the best tour in 2015 - Shania Twain Rock This Country Tour

=== 2016 ===
- CMT Artists' of the Year: Artist of a Lifetime Award
- Billboard Women in Music: Icon Award

=== 2018 ===
- CMC Music Awards ARIA Award for Highest Selling International Album of the Year Now
- Canadian Country Music Association Awards (CCMA's): Generation Award
- Canadian Country Music Association Awards (CCMA's): Top Selling Album - Now
- Canadian Country Music Association Awards (CCMA's): Top Selling Canadian Album - Now
- Canadian Country Music Association Awards (CCMA's): Apple Music Fan's Choice Award

=== 2022 ===
- Academy of Country Music Awards (ACMA's): ACM Poet's Award
- People's Choice Awards - (U.S.): Music Icon Award

=== 2023 ===
- CMT Music Awards: CMT Equal Play Award
