= Now Tour (Shania Twain) =

2018 concert tour by Shania Twain

- Tour by Shania Twain
- Location: Europe; North America; Oceania; South America
- Associated album: Now
- Start date: May 3, 2018
- End date: December 22, 2018
- Legs: 4
- No. of shows: 77
- Box office: US$76 million

Shania Twain concert chronology
- Rock This Country Tour (2015); Now Tour (2018); Let's Go! (2019–22)

The Now Tour was the fourth headlining concert tour by Canadian recording artist Shania Twain, in support of her fifth studio album Now (2017). The tour began on May 3, 2018, in Tacoma, and was initially scheduled to conclude in Las Vegas on August 4, 2018 but was later extended to conclude in Dunedin on December 22, 2018. The tour marks Twain's first since 2015's Rock This Country Tour, which, at the time, Twain announced would be her final run out on the road.

== Background ==
During an interview with ET Canada, on June 29, 2017, Twain stated that she had a change of heart and was ready to hit the road again to support her upcoming album, Now, stating "Now that I've got new music, I'm really motivated to do that music live".

On August 16, 2017, while appearing on The Tonight Show, host Jimmy Fallon announced that Twain will be embarking on the Now Tour in 2018. The following day on August 17, 2017, Twain confirmed that she will be going on tour to support her upcoming album Now, through social media with tickets going on sale the following week.

Following on from various promotional appearances for Now in the UK, including an exclusive set at Radio 2 Live in Hyde Park, Twain announced the UK/Ireland dates on September 20, 2017. Revealing her excitement over her tour news, Shania said, "It's time to get back out there and give the music a chance to live a life!" Tickets for shows in Dublin and Belfast sold out within minutes, prompting Twain to add a second Dublin show. Additional dates for both Glasgow and London were announced after tickets for the initial dates quickly sold out. Due to demand, extra dates were added for Brisbane, Melbourne, Sydney and Auckland. An additional concert for New Zealand was added for December 22 in Dunedin after the first two in Auckland sold out.

On February 26, 2018, she was announced as headliner for the Festa do Peão de Barretos, her first concert in Brazil. Negotiations for this to happen took over 20 years and Twain was paid over 1.1 million to perform for 55,000 fans who came from multiple countries of South America.

At the end of 2018, the tour placed at number 34 on Pollstar's "2018 Year-End Top 100 Worldwide Tours" list, estimating that it grossed $51.5 million and that 596,972 people attended throughout the year. In July 2019, Pollstar ranked the tour on number 69 at the Mid Year Top 100 Worldwide Tours 2019 with $8.5 million and 74,533 of tickets sold in 7 shows.

Overall according to Pollstar, the tour grossed $60 million in 59 dates for a total attendance of 671,505 people in an average of 11,381 fans per concert paying $100.40 for each ticket. According to Touring Data, which combines published and non-published boxscores in Pollstar and Billboard magazine, the tour had an estimated gross of $76 million in 76 dates and 860,000 tickets sold worldwide.

The tour is the best-selling tour for a country female artist in 2018 and the seventh best-selling for a female artist overall in the same year. The Now Tour helped secure Twain's place as the second highest-grossing country female artist in the decade with over $190 million collected, only behind Taylor Swift.

== Critical reception ==
The tour opened to positive critical reception. Fish Griwkowsky of the Edmonton Journal called the tour Twain's best, while Matt Olsen of the StarPhoenix complimented the show saying it was "filled with extravagance and punctuated with genuine emotion".

== Opening acts ==
On April 11, 2018, Swiss singer Bastian Baker confirmed he would be the opening act for all of the tour's 77 dates. Baker previously opened for Twain on the final two dates of her 2015 Rock This Country Tour.

The Shires joined Twain and Baker for the UK and Ireland dates.

== Set list ==
This set list is representative of the show on May 3, 2018, at Tacoma Dome in Tacoma, Washington. It is not representative of all concerts for the duration of the tour.

1. "Life's About to Get Good"
2. "Come on Over"
3. "Up!"
4. "Poor Me"
5. "Don't Be Stupid (You Know I Love You)"
6. "That Don't Impress Me Much"
7. "Let's Kiss and Make Up"
8. "Any Man of Mine"
9. "Whose Bed Have Your Boots Been Under?"
10. "Honey, I'm Home"
11. "I'm Alright"
12. "Soldier"
13. "You're Still the One"
14. "More Fun"
15. "The Woman in Me (Needs the Man in You)" (Video Interlude) (contains elements of "You Win My Love", "Don't!" and "Forever and for Always")
16. "From This Moment On"
17. "I'm Gonna Getcha Good!"
18. "Party for Two"
19. "Swingin' with My Eyes Closed"
20. "(If You're Not in It for Love) I'm Outta Here!"
21. "Man! I Feel Like a Woman!"
22. "Rock This Country!"

Additional Notes

- "Rock This Country!" was cut from the set list beginning with the July 27 Denver show.
- "Let's Kiss and Make Up" was cut from the set list beginning with the August 1 Fresno show.
- Brazil's show was set with no moving cubes and a slight change to set list.
- "Soldier" was cut from the set list beginning with the September 19 Glasgow show.
- "Soldier" was replaced by an interlude of "Ka-Ching!" performed by the backup dancers and singers for the Europe leg of the tour.
- For the Europe leg, no encore number(s) were performed, and the final song is "Man! I Feel Like a Woman!"

== Shows ==
List of 2018 concerts
Date (2018)	City	Country	Venue	Attendance	Revenue
May 3	Tacoma	United States	Tacoma Dome	13,753 / 13,753	$979,630
May 5	Vancouver	Canada	Rogers Arena	26,375 / 26,375	$2,301,320
May 6	Vancouver	Canada	Rogers Arena	26,375 / 26,375	$2,301,320
May 9	Edmonton	Canada	Rogers Place	26,183 / 26,183	$2,756,837
May 10	Edmonton	Canada	Rogers Place	26,183 / 26,183	$2,756,837
May 12	Saskatoon	Canada	SaskTel Centre	12,533 / 12,533	$1,310,375
May 13	Winnipeg	Canada	Bell MTS Place	11,552 / 11,552	$1,175,928
May 15	Saint Paul	United States	Xcel Energy Center	14,167 / 14,167	$1,266,557
May 16	Sioux Falls	United States	Denny Sanford Premier Center	8,950 / 8,950	$737,774
May 18	Omaha	United States	CenturyLink Center Omaha	13,236 / 13,236	$1,023,280
May 19	Chicago	United States	United Center	12,451 / 12,451	$1,134,116
June 1	Sunrise	United States	BB&T Center	8,172 / 8,172	$630,470
June 2	Tampa	United States	Amalie Arena	12,524 / 12,524	$1,195,568
June 4	Duluth	United States	Infinite Energy Arena	8,661 / 8,661	$653,875
June 6	Dallas	United States	American Airlines Center	12,194 / 12,194	$1,168,083
June 7	Austin	United States	Frank Erwin Center	7,771 / 10,630	$664,423
June 9	Houston	United States	Toyota Center	10,118 / 10,118	$966,244
June 10	New Orleans	United States	Smoothie King Center	10,959 / 10,959	$899,089
June 12	North Little Rock	United States	Verizon Arena	11,118 / 11,118	$648,185
June 13	St. Louis	United States	Scottrade Center	12,025 / 12,025	$947,964
June 15	Detroit	United States	Little Caesars Arena	12,357 / 12,357	$1,118,221
June 16	Cleveland	United States	Quicken Loans Arena	12,706 / 14,353	$1,135,361
June 25	Ottawa	Canada	Canadian Tire Centre	13,430 / 13,430	$1,195,923
June 26	Montreal	Canada	Bell Centre	12,467 / 14,402	$1,060,608
June 28	Quebec City	Canada	Videotron Centre	12,189 / 13,415	$1,008,070
June 30	Hamilton	Canada	FirstOntario Centre	12,043 / 12,787	$1,212,035
July 3	London	Canada	Budweiser Gardens	17,198 / 17,198	$1,483,923
July 4	London	Canada	Budweiser Gardens	17,198 / 17,198	$1,483,923
July 6	Toronto	Canada	Scotiabank Arena	28,360 / 29,233	$2,718,044
July 7	Toronto	Canada	Scotiabank Arena	28,360 / 29,233	$2,718,044
July 11	Boston	United States	TD Garden	12,818 / 12,818	$1,169,006
July 12	Philadelphia	United States	Wells Fargo Center	11,932 / 14,276	$677,648
July 14	New York City (Note: Labeled as Brooklyn in promotional material)	United States	Barclays Center	10,286 / 13,678	$850,953
July 15	Washington, D.C.	United States	Capital One Arena	12,076 / 13,541	$964,316
July 17	Pittsburgh	United States	PPG Paints Arena	12,482 / 13,465	$759,533
July 18	Grand Rapids	United States	Van Andel Arena	10,601 / 10,601	$818,874
July 20	Louisville	United States	KFC Yum! Center	13,433 / 15,171	$987,841
July 21	Nashville	United States	Bridgestone Arena	16,264 / 16,264	$1,441,204
July 24	Kansas City	United States	Sprint Center	12,671 / 12,671	$1,055,738
July 25	Des Moines	United States	Wells Fargo Arena	11,858 / 13,051	$1,036,654
July 27	Denver	United States	Pepsi Center	12,075 / 12,823	$1,029,394
July 28	Salt Lake City	United States	Vivint Smart Home Arena	10,256 / 10,776	$916,303
July 30	Phoenix	United States	Talking Stick Resort Arena	12,822 / 12,822	$1,177,835
August 1	Fresno	United States	Save Mart Center	9,830 / 10,993	$613,419
August 3	Los Angeles	United States	Staples Center	11,954 / 13,293	$919,244
August 4	Las Vegas	United States	MGM Grand Garden Arena	11,516 / 11,516	$1,008,100
August 18	Barretos	Brazil	Parque do Peão	55,000 / 55,000	$1,400,000
September 19	Glasgow	Scotland	SSE Hydro	21,125 / 21,238	$2,097,620
September 21	Glasgow	Scotland	SSE Hydro	21,125 / 21,238	$2,097,620
September 22	Manchester	England	Manchester Arena	14,331 / 14,548	$1,425,280
September 24	Birmingham	England	Arena Birmingham	10,713 / 10,713	$1,055,379
September 26	Dublin	Ireland	3Arena	24,606 / 24,606	$2,157,346
September 27	Dublin	Ireland	3Arena	24,606 / 24,606	$2,157,346
September 29	Belfast	Northern Ireland	SSE Arena	9,543 / 9,543	$704,094
October 2	London	England	The O_{2} Arena	20,652 / 25,485	$2,009,010
October 3	London	England	The O_{2} Arena	20,652 / 25,485	$2,009,010
October 5	Munich	Germany	Olympiahalle	—N/a	—N/a
October 6	Prague	Czech Republic	O_{2} Arena	—N/a	—N/a
October 8	Cologne	Germany	Lanxess Arena	4,500 / 4,500	$350,174
October 10	Antwerp	Belgium	Sportpaleis	—N/a	—N/a
October 11	Amsterdam	Netherlands	Ziggo Dome	—N/a	—N/a
October 13	Hamburg	Germany	Barclaycard Arena	—N/a	—N/a
October 14	Copenhagen	Denmark	Royal Arena	—N/a	—N/a
October 16	Oslo	Norway	Oslo Spektrum	—N/a	—N/a
October 17	Stockholm	Sweden	Ericsson Globe	—N/a	—N/a
November 30	Perth	Australia	Perth Arena	11,499 / 12,633	$1,310,410
December 2	Adelaide	Australia	Botanic Park	—N/a	—N/a
December 5	Brisbane	Australia	Brisbane Entertainment Centre	17,831 / 17,831	$2,208,308
December 6	Brisbane	Australia	Brisbane Entertainment Centre	17,831 / 17,831	$2,208,308
December 8	Hunter Valley	Australia	Hope Estate	—N/a	—N/a
December 11	Melbourne	Australia	Rod Laver Arena	23,459 / 30,000	$2,597,647
December 12	Melbourne	Australia	Rod Laver Arena	23,459 / 30,000	$2,597,647
December 14	Sydney	Australia	Sydney SuperDome	21,744 / 22,000	$2,455,260
December 15	Sydney	Australia	Sydney SuperDome	21,744 / 22,000	$2,455,260
December 18	Auckland	New Zealand	Spark Arena	15,765 / 19,664	$1,739,870
December 19	Auckland	New Zealand	Spark Arena	15,765 / 19,664	$1,739,870
December 22	Dunedin	New Zealand	Forsyth Barr Stadium	—N/a	—N/a
Total				742,134 / 783,796 (95%)	$66,898,979
