= Rock This Country Tour =

2015 concert tour by Shania Twain

- Concert tour by Shania Twain
- Location: North America
- Start date: June 5, 2015
- End date: October 27, 2015
- Legs: 2
- No. of shows: 72
- Supporting act: Gavin DeGraw • Wes Mack
- Attendance: 703,148
- Box office: US$69 million

Shania Twain concert chronology
- Shania: Still the One (2012–14); Rock This Country Tour (2015); Now Tour (2018)

The Rock This Country Tour was the third concert tour by Canadian recording artist Shania Twain. The tour was Twain's first tour in eleven years and was billed as her farewell tour. The tour kicked off on June 5, 2015, in Seattle, and concluded in Kelowna on October 27, 2015. The trek preceded the release of Twain's fifth studio album. At the end of 2015, the tour placed 19th on Pollstar's "2015 Year-End Top 100 Worldwide Tours" list, grossing $69 million from 72 shows with a total attendance of 703,148.

== Background ==
On March 4, 2015, while appearing on Good Morning America, Twain announced the tour as well as her upcoming album. Since this is her last tour, Twain said that she wants to go out on bang and she's "ready to hang my hat up in that regard", which is touring. Twain also shared that this going to "be a real, kickin' hard-hitting, fun party show". Due to popular demand, nineteen additional dates were added in May 2015, forming the second North American leg.

In July 2015, Twain's agent said it was very likely an international leg of the tour would take place in the spring and summer of 2016.

On August 24, 2015, Shania Twain announced in an interview that she is not ready to give up touring and that she planned for a two-year return residency to Las Vegas.

== Concert synopsis ==
Twain performing during the tour at The Palace of Auburn Hills in July 2015

After a video introduction, Twain emerges onstage atop a rising platform in thigh-high leather boots, a red, sequined mini-dress and a black leather jacket singing "Rock This Country!" From there, Twain continues the opening portion of the show with "Honey, I'm Home" and "You Win My Love", number one country radio hits from 1998 and 1996, respectively, before launching into a punchy take on her first radio hit, "Whose Bed Have Your Boots Been Under?" After a chat with the audience, Twain keeps the show in full country mode with "I Ain't No Quitter", her 1997 five-week number one hit "Love Gets Me Every Time", and the fan favorite "Don't Be Stupid (You Know I Love You)".

After making her way through the audience during "Any Man of Mine", Twain disappears for a costume change while her seven-member band provides an interlude of her 2003 international hit "Ka-Ching!". Accompanied by a flurry of pyrotechnics, Twain reappears on stage in a black leather, body-hugging ensemble for "I'm Gonna Getcha Good!" After the breezy "Come On Over" and opening act accompanied duet of "Party for Two", Twain takes a moment to chat with the audience about the voice struggles she has had in recent years and how she thought she "would never sing again" and that it is a "miracle" she made it back onstage. Exclaiming that "there's no way but up from here", Twain ascends into the air on a saddle that takes her in a long, slow circle above the audience as she sings "Up!".

Once back onstage, Twain and her band begin an acoustic set, beginning with her most recent single at the time, 2011's "Today Is Your Day" and the infectious and light "No One Needs to Know". Twain is then left alone on center stage, and sings two of her biggest hits, 1998's multi-platinum and Grammy award-winning "You're Still the One", and "From This Moment On". The "From This Moment On" performance is considered the highlight of the nearly two-hour concert. Returning in thigh-high red leather boots and an oversized black shawl, Twain closes out the main portion of the show with the one-two punch of "That Don't Impress Me Much" and "(If You're Not in It for Love) I'm Outta Here!". She returns in a half-body catsuit for the fiery, firework filled finale of "Man! I Feel Like A Woman!".

== Opening acts ==
- Wes Mack (Seattle, select Canadian dates)
- Gavin DeGraw (United States, select Canadian dates)

== Setlist ==
This set list is representative of the show on July 25, 2015, at The Palace of Auburn Hills in Auburn Hills, Michigan. It is not representative of all concerts for the duration of the tour.

1. "Rock This Country!"
2. "Honey, I'm Home"
3. "You Win My Love"
4. "Whose Bed Have Your Boots Been Under?"
5. "I Ain't No Quitter"
6. "Love Gets Me Every Time"
7. "Don't Be Stupid (You Know I Love You)"
8. "Any Man of Mine"
9. "I'm Gonna Getcha Good!"
10. "Come On Over"
11. "Party for Two" (performed with Gavin DeGraw)
12. "Up!"
13. "Today Is Your Day"
14. "No One Needs to Know"
15. "You're Still the One"
16. "From This Moment On"
17. "That Don't Impress Me Much"
18. "(If You're Not in It for Love) I'm Outta Here!"
  Encore
19. "Video Sequence/Red Storm"
20. "Man! I Feel Like a Woman!"

== Shows ==
Date	City	Country	Venue	Opening act(s)	Attendance	Revenue
North America — Leg 1
June 5, 2015	Seattle	United States	KeyArena	Wes Mack	11,428 / 11,428	$1,123,180
June 7, 2015	Vancouver	Canada	Rogers Arena	Wes Mack	26,418 / 26,418	$2,436,050
June 9, 2015	Vancouver	Canada	Rogers Arena	Wes Mack	26,418 / 26,418	$2,436,050
June 11, 2015	Edmonton	Canada	Rexall Place	Wes Mack	26,892 / 26,892	$2,709,440
June 12, 2015	Edmonton	Canada	Rexall Place	Wes Mack	26,892 / 26,892	$2,709,440
June 14, 2015	Saskatoon	Canada	SaskTel Centre	Wes Mack	12,927 / 12,927	$1,271,280
June 15, 2015	Winnipeg	Canada	MTS Centre	Wes Mack	11,265 / 11,265	$1,145,700
June 19, 2015	London	Canada	Budweiser Gardens	Wes Mack	16,901 / 16,901	$1,977,840
June 20, 2015	London	Canada	Budweiser Gardens	Wes Mack	16,901 / 16,901	$1,977,840
June 22, 2015	Hamilton	Canada	FirstOntario Centre	Wes Mack	13,197 / 13,197	$1,375,830
June 24, 2015	Toronto	Canada	Air Canada Centre	Wes Mack	29,259 / 29,259	$2,819,350
June 25, 2015	Toronto	Canada	Air Canada Centre	Wes Mack	29,259 / 29,259	$2,819,350
June 27, 2015	Ottawa	Canada	Wesley Clover Parks	Wes Mack; Dan + Shay; The Doobie Brothers	18,426 / 18,426	$1,672,780
June 28, 2015	Montreal	Canada	Bell Centre	Wes Mack	14,141 / 14,141	$1,380,360
June 30, 2015	New York City	United States	Madison Square Garden	Gavin DeGraw	12,396 / 12,396	$1,425,828
July 1, 2015	Uniondale	United States	Nassau Veterans Memorial Coliseum	Gavin DeGraw	—N/a	—N/a
July 3, 2015	Uncasville	United States	Mohegan Sun Arena	Gavin DeGraw	6,293 / 7,161	$1,038,600
July 7, 2015	Newark	United States	Prudential Center	Gavin DeGraw	—N/a	—N/a
July 8, 2015	Boston	United States	TD Garden	Gavin DeGraw	10,644 / 11,822	$1,147,214
July 10, 2015	Pittsburgh	United States	Consol Energy Center	Gavin DeGraw	12,497 / 13,035	$1,162,682
July 11, 2015	Grand Rapids	United States	Van Andel Arena	Gavin DeGraw	9,729 / 10,202	$973,974
July 13, 2015	Indianapolis	United States	Bankers Life Fieldhouse	Gavin DeGraw	8,081 / 9,726	$742,758
July 15, 2015	Jacksonville	United States	Jacksonville Veterans Memorial Arena	Gavin DeGraw	7,905 / 8,649	$686,888
July 16, 2015	Miami	United States	American Airlines Arena	Gavin DeGraw	6,355 / 7,200	$526,433
July 18, 2015	Greenville	United States	Bon Secours Wellness Arena	Gavin DeGraw	7,922 / 8,730	$712,654
July 19, 2015	Charlotte	United States	Time Warner Cable Arena	Gavin DeGraw	9,003 / 10,386	$802,928
July 21, 2015	Washington, D.C.	United States	Verizon Center	Gavin DeGraw	9,126 / 11,119	$975,520
July 22, 2015	Philadelphia	United States	Wells Fargo Center	Gavin DeGraw	8,913 / 10,469	$926,338
July 25, 2015	Auburn Hills	United States	The Palace of Auburn Hills	Gavin DeGraw	12,833 / 12,833	$1,183,978
July 26, 2015	Moline	United States	iWireless Center	Gavin DeGraw	9,499 / 9,824	$888,554
July 28, 2015	Minneapolis	United States	Target Center	Gavin DeGraw	13,858 / 13,858	$1,227,618
July 29, 2015	Rosemont	United States	Allstate Arena	Gavin DeGraw	12,331 / 12,331	$1,265,461
July 31, 2015	Nashville	United States	Bridgestone Arena	Gavin DeGraw	13,495 / 13,495	$1,313,440
August 1, 2015	Atlanta	United States	Philips Arena	Gavin DeGraw	11,840 / 11,840	$1,137,640
August 3, 2015	Louisville	United States	KFC Yum! Center	Gavin DeGraw	10,730 / 11,406	$1,001,680
August 4, 2015	St. Louis	United States	Scottrade Center	Gavin DeGraw	10,767 / 11,203	$961,602
August 6, 2015	Des Moines	United States	Wells Fargo Arena	Gavin DeGraw	11,855 / 11,855	$1,064,870
August 7, 2015	Kansas City	United States	Sprint Center	Gavin DeGraw	13,154 / 13,154	$1,190,374
August 9, 2015	Austin	United States	Frank Erwin Center	Gavin DeGraw	10,083 / 11,571	$990,618
August 10, 2015	Dallas	United States	American Airlines Center	Gavin DeGraw	12,066 / 12,066	$1,127,536
August 12, 2015	Oklahoma City	United States	Chesapeake Energy Arena	Gavin DeGraw	9,436 / 10,342	$905,344
August 14, 2015	Denver	United States	Pepsi Center	Gavin DeGraw	10,823 / 10,823	$1,039,436
August 15, 2015	Salt Lake City	United States	EnergySolutions Arena	Gavin DeGraw	11,677 / 11,677	$854,366
August 17, 2015	San Jose	United States	SAP Center	Gavin DeGraw	8,517 / 10,290	$864,917
August 19, 2015	Anaheim	United States	Honda Center	Gavin DeGraw	7,307 / 9,236	$749,465
August 20, 2015	Los Angeles	United States	Staples Center	Gavin DeGraw	8,198 / 9,930	$790,511
August 22, 2015	San Diego	United States	Valley View Casino Center	Gavin DeGraw	7,647 / 8,989	$727,900
August 23, 2015	Fresno	United States	Save Mart Center	Gavin DeGraw	9,410 / 9,983	$914,788
North America — Leg 2
September 12, 2015	Spokane	United States	Spokane Arena	Gavin DeGraw	6,742 / 7,172	$548,642
September 13, 2015	Portland	United States	Moda Center	Gavin DeGraw	6,908 / 8,256	$659,428
September 15, 2015	Boise	United States	Taco Bell Arena	Gavin DeGraw	—N/a	
September 17, 2015	Calgary	Canada	Scotiabank Saddledome	Gavin DeGraw	19,191 / 21,128	$1,619,760
September 18, 2015	Calgary	Canada	Scotiabank Saddledome	Gavin DeGraw	19,191 / 21,128	$1,619,760
September 20, 2015	Winnipeg	Canada	MTS Center	Gavin DeGraw	10,786 / 11,313	$908,433
September 21, 2015	Fargo	United States	Fargodome	Gavin DeGraw	11,488 / 13,200	$1,079,078
September 23, 2015	Sioux Falls	United States	Denny Sanford Premier Center	Gavin DeGraw	9,925 / 9,925	$1,007,240
September 24, 2015	Lincoln	United States	Pinnacle Bank Arena	Gavin DeGraw	12,311 / 12,311	$1,098,114
September 26, 2015	Minneapolis	United States	Target Center	Gavin DeGraw	10,441 / 11,701	$832,988
September 27, 2015	Madison	United States	Kohl Center	Gavin DeGraw	8,774 / 9,845	$818,292
September 29, 2015	Peoria	United States	Peoria Civic Center	Gavin DeGraw	5,410 / 7,147	$450,300
September 30, 2015	Columbus	United States	Nationwide Arena	Gavin DeGraw	8,667 / 10,541	$697,222
October 2, 2015	Allentown	United States	PPL Center	Gavin DeGraw	7,442 / 8,326	$644,023
October 3, 2015	Buffalo	United States	First Niagara Center	Gavin DeGraw	9,468 / 10,443	$725,391
October 9, 2015	Quebec City	Canada	Videotron Centre	Gavin DeGraw	13,284 / 13,284	$1,288,990
October 11, 2015	Toronto	Canada	Air Canada Centre	Gavin DeGraw	14,639 / 14,639	$1,349,540
October 18, 2015	Regina	Canada	Brandt Centre	Wes Mack	8,586 / 9,540	$1,115,858
October 19, 2015	Regina	Canada	Brandt Centre	Wes Mack		
October 21, 2015	Grande Prairie	Canada	Revolution Place	Wes Mack	4,069 / 4,069	$641,508
October 22, 2015	Prince George	Canada	CN Centre	Wes Mack		
October 24, 2015	Victoria	Canada	Save on Foods Memorial Centre	Wes Mack	8,193 / 9,008	$1,114,298
October 25, 2015	Victoria	Canada	Save on Foods Memorial Centre	Wes Mack		
October 27, 2015	Kelowna	Canada	Prospera Place	Wes Mack	5,443 / 5,443	$769,893
Total					687,011 / 714,646	$66,602,720

=== Cancelled shows ===
List of cancelled concerts, showing date, city, country, venue and reason for cancellation
Date	City	Country	Venue	Reason
October 6, 2015	Manchester	United States	Verizon Wireless Arena	Respiratory Infection
October 7, 2015	Albany	United States	Times Union Center	Respiratory Infection
