= God Bless the Child (Shania Twain song) =

1996 single by Shania Twain

Single by Shania Twain

from the album The Woman in Me
- B-side: "The Woman in Me (Needs the Man in You)"; "Whose Bed Have Your Boots Been Under?"; "If It Don't Take Two"; "(If You're Not in It for Love) I'm Outta Here!"
- Released: October 26, 1996
- Recorded: 1994 (album version); 1996 (single version)
- Studio: A.R.P. Track Productions (Sainte-Anne-des-Lacs, Quebec, Canada); Sound Stage Recording Studios (Nashville, TN)
- Genre: Gospel; country
- Length: 3:49
- Label: PolyGram; Mercury Nashville
- Songwriters: Robert John "Mutt" Lange; Shania Twain
- Producer: Robert John "Mutt" Lange

Shania Twain singles chronology
"Home Ain't Where His Heart Is (Anymore)" (1996)	"God Bless the Child" (1996)	"Love Gets Me Every Time" (1997)

Music video
- "Shania Twain - God Bless The Child (Official Music Video)" on YouTube

Music video
- "Shania Twain - God Bless The Child (With Banjo)" on YouTube

"God Bless the Child" is a song co-written and recorded by Canadian country music artist Shania Twain. It was released on October 26, 1996 as the eighth and final single from her sophomore studio album The Woman in Me (1995). The album version was solely written by Twain and the single version was co-written by Mutt Lange. The album version is more a poem than a song, completely done a cappella. A country version and an alternate version without the banjo were later released for airplay. "God Bless the Child" is one of Twain's few songs to have a major gospel music influence.

"God Bless the Child" was the least successful single from The Woman in Me, failing to crack the top 40 at US country radio and only peaking at number 7 at Canada country radio. It was included on Twain's Come on Over Tour usually accompanied by a local choir, and on Australian and Asian tour editions of the Come On Over album. All singles sales from the United States were donated to Second Harvest/Kids Cafe, and from Canada to Breakfast for Learning. Twain performed the song live at the 1996 Country Music Association Awards.

== Critical reception ==
Entertainment Weekly gave the song a fairly favorable review, giving it a B grade and saying "while her sentiments are pretty naive, her pipes sound plenty experienced" and that Twain gives "enough passion to make us temporarily forget her pinup looks".

== Music video ==
The music video for "God Bless the Child" was shot in Nashville, Tennessee and directed by Larry Jordan. It was filmed on October 3, 1996, and debuted on October 26, 1996, on Country Music Television. The video features two choirs. One included the Fisk University Jubilee Singers and the second was a local performing arts choirs singing along with Twain in a hangar at the Nashville airport. Two versions of the video were released, one with the banjo included in the audio for country stations, another without for pop and international stations. The "banjo version" video is available on Twain's DVD The Platinum Collection.

"God Bless the Child" is one of Twain's least-viewed videos on YouTube, with just over 3.4 million views as of October 2020.

== Chart performance ==
"God Bless the Child" debuted on the Billboard Hot Country Singles & Tracks chart the week of November 30, 1996 at number 74. The song spent 9 weeks on the chart and climbed to a peak position of number 48 on January 11, 1997, where it remained for one week. "God Bless the Child" became her lowest peaking single on the chart and one of her shortest runs on the chart. It did however, top the Country Singles Sales chart for one week. Despite failure at country radio, "God Bless the Child" became Twain's fourth appearance on the Billboard Hot 100 where it peaked at number 75. It also reached number 50 on the Hot 100 Singles Sales chart.

"God Bless the Child" debuted on the Canadian RPM Country Tracks chart the week of November 25, 1996 at number 75, the highest debut of the week. The song would go on to peak at number seven on the week of January 20, 1997, seven weeks later. This song and "Home Ain't Where His Heart Is (Anymore)" marked the only singles from The Woman in Me to miss the top spot at country radio in Twain's home country. On the sales-only Canadian Singles Chart however, the song was a success, topping the chart for nine non-consecutive weeks and spending 38 weeks in total on that chart.

== Track listing ==
US Single

1. "God Bless the Child" (New Previously Unreleased Version) – 3:48
2. "(If You're Not in It for Love) I'm Outta Here!" (Remix) 4:21

Canada Maxi-CD

1. "God Bless the Child" – 3:49
2. "(If You're Not In It for Love) I'm Outta Here!" (Remix) – 4:40
3. "Whose Bed Have Your Boots Been Under?" (Dance Mix) – 4:50
4. "The Woman in Me (Needs the Man in You)" (Steel Guitarless Mix) – 4:50

US cassette single

1. "God Bless the Child" – 3:48
2. "If It Don't Take Two" – 3:40

== Official versions ==
- Album Version (1:30)
- Single Mix - Country Version (3:49)
- Single Mix - Without Banjo (3:49)

== Charts ==
=== Weekly charts ===
Weekly chart performance for "God Bless the Child"
Chart (1996–2002)	Peak position
Canada (Nielsen SoundScan)	1
Canada Country Singles (RPM)	7
US Billboard Hot 100	75
US Hot Country Songs (Billboard)	48
US Top Country Singles Sales (Billboard)	1

=== Year-end charts ===
2001 year-end chart performance for "God Bless the Child"
Chart (2001)	Position
Canada (Nielsen SoundScan)	153

2002 year-end chart performance for "God Bless the Child"
Chart (2002)	Position
Canada (Nielsen SoundScan)	149

=== Decade-end charts ===
Decade-end chart performance for "God Bless the Child"
Chart (1990s)	Position
Canada (Nielsen Soundscan)	11
