= The Platinum Collection (Shania Twain album) =

Video by Shania Twain
- Released: November 6, 2001
- Recorded: 1993–1999
- Genre: Country, pop, adult contemporary
- Length: 80:32 minutes
- Label: Mercury Nashville
- Director: Markus Blunder, Paul Boyd, John Derek, Steven Goldmann, David Hogan, Larry Jordan, Sean Penn, Charley Randazzo, Timothy White

Shania Twain chronology
Come On Over: Video Collection (1999)	The Platinum Collection (2001)	The Specials (2001)

The Platinum Collection is the first music video compilation by Canadian singer Shania Twain. It was released on November 6, 2001 by Mercury Nashville Records. The video consists of the music videos from Twain's first three studio albums, Shania Twain (1993), The Woman in Me (1995) and Come on Over (1997), with the exception of "When" (1998), which was released exclusively to the United Kingdom. In 2004, the video was certified platinum by the RIAA for shipments of over 100,000 copies in the United States.

== Track listing ==
No.	Title	Director(s)	Length
1.	"What Made You Say That"	Steven Goldmann	3:01
2.	"Dance with the One That Brought You"	Sean Penn	2:31
3.	"You Lay a Whole Lot of Love on Me"	Goldmann	2:50
4.	"Whose Bed Have Your Boots Been Under?"	John Derek	4:28
5.	"Any Man of Mine" (video version)	Derek; Charley Randazzo	4:12
6.	"The Woman in Me (Needs the Man in You)"	Markus Blunder	4:49
7.	"(If You're Not in It for Love) I'm Outta Here!"	Goldmann	4:37
8.	"You Win My Love" (Mutt Lange mix)	Goldmann	4:32
9.	"No One Needs to Know" (all performance version)	Goldmann	3:47
10.	"Home Ain't Where His Heart Is (Anymore)"	Goldmann	4:14
11.	"God Bless the Child" (single mix) (country version)	Larry Jordan	3:51
12.	"Love Gets Me Every Time"	Timothy White	3:37
13.	"Don't Be Stupid (You Know I Love You)"	Jordan	3:38
14.	"You're Still the One" (international version)	David Hogan	3:22
15.	"Honey, I'm Home"	Jordan	3:45
16.	"From This Moment On" (the right mix) (blooper version)	Paul Boyd	3:57
17.	"That Don't Impress Me Much"	Boyd	3:47
18.	"Man! I Feel Like a Woman!" (alternate mix)	Boyd	3:57
19.	"You've Got a Way" (Notting Hill remix) (all performance version)	Boyd	3:30
20.	"Come on Over"	Jordan	3:13
21.	"Rock This Country!"	Jordan	4:20

== Certifications ==
Region	Certification	Certified units/sales
Brazil (Pro-Música Brasil)	Gold	25,000^{*}
United Kingdom (BPI)	2× Platinum	100,000^{*}
United States (RIAA)	Platinum	100,000^{^}
^{*} Sales figures based on certification alone.^{^} Shipments figures based on certification alone.
