= Home Ain't Where His Heart Is (Anymore) =

Single by Shania Twain

from the album The Woman in Me
- B-side: "Whose Bed Have Your Boots Been Under?"
- Released: July 29, 1996
- Studio: A.R.P. Track Productions (Sainte-Anne-des-Lacs, Quebec, Canada); Sound Stage Recording Studios (Nashville, TN)
- Genre: Country
- Length: 3:59
- Label: PolyGram; Mercury Nashville
- Songwriters: Robert John "Mutt" Lange; Shania Twain
- Producer: Robert John "Mutt" Lange

Shania Twain singles chronology
"No One Needs to Know" (1996)	"Home Ain't Where His Heart Is (Anymore)" (1996)	"God Bless the Child" (1996)

Music video
- "Home Ain't Where His Heart Is (Anymore)" on YouTube

"Home Ain't Where His Heart Is (Anymore)" is a song co-written and recorded by Canadian country music artist Shania Twain. It was released on July 24, 1996, as the seventh single from her second studio album The Woman in Me. It was written by Twain and her then-husband Robert John "Mutt" Lange. It also serves as the opening track to The Woman in Me.

The song became the first from The Woman in Me not to reach the top 20 of the US Hot Country Songs and was the first single to miss the number one spot on the Canadian RPM Country Songs Chart. "Home Ain't Where His Heart Is (Anymore)" was also included in a medley on Twain's Come on Over Tour.

== Critical reception ==
Billboard reviewed the song favorably, calling it a "powerfully affecting ballad" and praising Twain's "sensitive treatment."

== Music video ==
The music video for "Home Ain't Where His Heart Is" was shot in Montreal, Quebec and directed by Steven Goldmann. It was filmed on July 9, 1996 and debuted on July 24, 1996 on CMT. The video features Twain as a struggling wife and mother, and shows the hard times she is going through as described in the song especially as her husband leaves her and their young baby near the end. The set consisting of a kitchen and bedroom has the walls only partially built with bricks surrounded by trees and curtains, with a rain scene near the end depicting Twain's crumbling relationship with her husband. The video is shot in black and white with occasional tinted shots and is available on Twain's DVD The Platinum Collection.

== Chart performance ==
"Home Ain't Where His Heart Is (Anymore)" debuted on the Billboard Hot Country Singles & Tracks chart the week of August 10, 1996 at number 66. The song spent 14 weeks on the chart and climbed to a peak position of number 28 on October 5, 1996, where it remained for one week. The single became Twain's first from The Woman in Me to miss the top 20.

Prior to "Home Ain't Where His Heart Is (Anymore)", all six previous singles from The Woman in Me went number one on the Canadian RPM Country Songs chart, with "(If You're Not in It for Love) I'm Outta Here!" spending the most weeks with six consecutive weeks. "Home Ain't Where His Heart Is (Anymore)" broke the streak by peaking at number 7. It not only became the lowest peaking single from The Woman in Me, but also became Twain's lowest peaking single since 1993's "Dance with the One That Brought You", which had only reached number 77.

== Official versions ==
- Album Version (4:12)
- Radio Edit (3:59)

== Charts ==
Chart (1996)	Peak position
Canada Country Singles (RPM)	7
US Hot Country Songs (Billboard)	28
US Top Country Singles Sales (Billboard) with "You Win My Love"	19

=== Year-end charts ===
Chart (1996)	Position
Canada Country Tracks (RPM)	80

== Release history ==
Release dates and format(s) for "Home Ain't Where His Heart Is (Anymore)"
Region	Date	Format(s)	Label(s)	Ref.
United States	July 29, 1996	Country radio	Mercury Nashville	
