= Love Gets Me Every Time =

1997 single by Shania Twain

Single by Shania Twain

from the album Come On Over
- Released: September 23, 1997
- Studio: Masterfonics (Nashville, Tennessee)
- Genre: Country pop
- Length: 3:33
- Label: Mercury Nashville
- Songwriters: Shania Twain; Robert John "Mutt" Lange
- Producer: Robert John "Mutt" Lange

Shania Twain singles chronology
"God Bless the Child" (1996)	"Love Gets Me Every Time" (1997)	"Don't Be Stupid (You Know I Love You)" (1997)

Music video
- "Love Gets Me Every Time" on YouTube

"Love Gets Me Every Time" is a song by Canadian singer-songwriter Shania Twain. It was written by Twain along with her then husband Robert John "Mutt" Lange, and produced by Lange. It was released on September 23, 1997, by Mercury Records Nashville as the lead single from Twain's third studio album Come On Over (1997). It was chosen as such following weeks of careful deliberation and constant reconsidering. Originally titled "'Gol Darn Gone and Done It", the song's title was altered because of its difficulty to pronounce. The song regards falling in love despite numerous attempts to evade it. It is an uptempo number that prominently features fiddle.

Critics favored "Love Gets Me Every Time"'s immaculate production. The song became a success in country radio. It topped Billboard's Hot Country Songs chart for five consecutive weeks, Twain's fifth and longest reign on the chart. It was certified gold by the Recording Industry Association of America (RIAA) for shipments of over 500,000 copies in the United States. "Love Gets Me Every Time" was also her seventh number-one country hit in Canada. Its music video was directed by photographer Timothy White during the photo shoot for Come On Over's album art. It features Twain in various performance scenes, along with behind-the-scenes shots. Furthermore, the song has become a staple on Twain's set lists, as it was performed live on the Come On Over, Up! and Rock This Country tours, as well as the Let's Go! residency in Las Vegas. In addition, the song was performed in an acoustic version on the Still the One residency.

== Background ==
"Love Gets Me Every Time" was written by Twain and her then husband Robert John "Mutt" Lange, and produced solely by Lange. Twain developed the song at first and brought it to Lange under the title "'Gol Darn Gone and Done It", which derived from a country expression Twain had heard of. The name made Lange burst in laughter when he first heard it, and the couple completed the song together. However, executives at Mercury Records Nashville were concerned that radio DJs would mispronounce the title's tongue twisting words when announcing the single. Twain concurred, and renamed it "Love Gets Me Every Time" instead. The track was chosen as the lead single for Come On Over after a few weeks of careful deliberation. Twain told CMT Totally in 1997, "We had such a hard time choosing this first single. I don't know. We just ended up there. We went around in circles for weeks until we finally decided on that single. It really just felt right, and I really can't describe it any better than that. I think it's just one of those things where we had the chance to live with the options for a few weeks and everyone just ended up there. So, it just felt right. I guess we went with our gut on that one." A CD single, 7-inch vinyl single and a cassette single were released simultaneously on September 23, 1997, in the US, featuring three versions of "Love Gets Me Every Time". A second CD single and vinyl single with a dance mix of the song was released on the same day. The song was later included on Twain's Greatest Hits (2004) compilation.

== Critical reception ==
Reviews from critics were generally favorable. Alanna Nash of Entertainment Weekly believed "Love Gets Me Every Time" followed the successful formula of her past hits, including rich and smooth vocals and infectious superstructure. Deborah Evans Price of Billboard picked the single as having the most potential, predicting it would "rocket up the charts" given that Lange and Twain followed formula they created for Twain's previous album The Woman in Me (1995). Furthermore, she stated, "The lyric is lightweight, the performance is pretty much a matter of individual taste, and, as usual, the production is the real star here." Matt Bjorke of About.com listed the song amongst the pros of Come On Over. While reviewing Greatest Hits, Nick Reynolds of BBC called the track "infectiously cheerful", and spoke of it when explaining how Twain and Lange "raise[d] their game" on Come On Over. "Love Gets Me Everytime" was awarded a BMI Country Award at the 1998 ceremony.

== Chart performance ==
"Love Gets Me Every Time" peaked at number four the Canadian Singles Chart, a now-defunct chart which only tracked physical single sales, and was compiled by Nielsen SoundScan and published by Jam!. "Love Gets Me Every Time" debuted at number 67 on RPM's airplay-measuring Canadian Country Singles chart on the week of September 22, 1997. The following week it jumped to number 49. On the week of October 13, 1997, in its fourth week on the chart, the single reached the chart's summit, where it remained for six consecutive weeks. On the week of November 24, 1997, the song fell to number two, behind Paul Brandt's "A Little in Love". The song spent a total of 37 weeks on the chart, spending its last week at number 87 on the week of June 15, 1998. It was ranked fifth on RPM's Canadian Country Singles year-end chart of 1997. In the US, "Love Gets Me Every Time" peaked at number 25 on the all-genre Billboard Hot 100, her highest peak position at the time (the album’s third single "You're Still the One" would become a crossover smash hit and peak at the runner-up spot for over two months). The single also debuted at 29 on Billboard's Hot Country Songs on the week of October 4, 1997, her highest debut at the time. After five weeks ascending the chart, the song climbed from number three to number-one on the week of November 8, 1997. It remained atop the chart for five consecutive weeks, becoming Twain's fifth and longest reign on country radio and was once tied third for most weeks at number one by a female artist. The track stayed on Hot Country Songs for a total of 20 weeks. The single was certified gold by the Recording Industry Association of America (RIAA) for shipment of over 500,000 physical copies in the US.

== Music video ==
The music video for "Love Gets Me Every Time" was directed by photographer Timothy White. The video was filmed on September 3, 1997, in New York City, New York, as White photographed Twain for the Come On Over album art. The clip commences with a seemingly tired Twain exiting an elevator in casual apparel (a leopard print jacket, white tank top, blue denim pants, and tennis shoes) to begin the photo shoot. As it continues, the video features three performance scenes, along with behind-the-scenes footage of Twain selecting wardrobe for the photo shoot, undergoing hair and make up, and relaxing in her dressing room. The first performance scene is a close-up of Twain; the second captures Twain with teased hair, a red dress and red lipstick as she lies before a white backdrop; while the third is a black-and-white schemed shot of Twain standing before a black backdrop in a black, sequined crop top and matching, high-wasted pants. The video ends with a reverse video shot of its opening sequence. The music video premiered on September 24, 1997, on Country Music Television (CMT). The video is available on Twain's compilations Come On Over: Video Collection (1999) and The Platinum Collection (2001).

== Live performances ==
Twain first performed "Love Gets Me Every Time" at the 31st Country Music Association Awards (CMAs) on September 24, 1997, at the Grand Ole Opry House in Nashville, Tennessee.

== Track listing ==
- US and Canadian CD single and vinyl
1. "Love Gets Me Every Time" (album version) – 3:33
2. "Love Gets Me Every Time" (dance mix) – 4:42

== Charts ==
=== Weekly charts ===
Chart (1997)	Peak position
Canada (Nielsen SoundScan)	4
Canada Country Singles (RPM)	1
US Billboard Hot 100	25
US Hot Country Songs (Billboard)	1
US Top Country Singles Sales (Billboard)	2

=== Year-end charts ===
Chart (1997)	Position
Canada Country Tracks (RPM)	5

== Certifications ==
Region	Certification	Certified units/sales
United States (RIAA)	Gold	500,000^{^}
^{^} Shipments figures based on certification alone.

== Works cited ==
- Eggar, Robin (2005). Shania Twain: The Biography. New York City: Simon & Schuster. ISBN 978-0743497350.
