= The Woman in Me (Needs the Man in You) =

Single by Shania Twain

from the album The Woman in Me
- B-side: "Leaving Is the Only Way Out"; "(If You're Not in It for Love) I'm Outta Here!
- Released: August 9, 1995
- Recorded: 1994
- Studio: A.R.P. Track Productions (Sainte-Anne-des-Lacs, Quebec, Canada); Sound Stage Recording Studios (Nashville, TN)
- Genre: Country pop; adult contemporary
- Length: 3:57
- Label: Polygram; Mercury Nashville
- Songwriters: Robert John "Mutt" Lange; Shania Twain
- Producer: Robert John "Mutt" Lange

Shania Twain singles chronology
"Any Man of Mine" (1995)	"The Woman in Me (Needs the Man in You)" (1995)	"(If You're Not in It for Love) I'm Outta Here!" (1995)

Music video
- "The Woman in Me (Needs the Man in You)" on YouTube

"The Woman in Me (Needs the Man in You)" is a song co-written and recorded by Canadian country music singer Shania Twain. It was released in August 1995 as the third single and title track from her second studio album The Woman in Me. The song was written by Mutt Lange and Twain. The song became Twain's third top-twenty hit at country radio. It was released to radio in August 1995, following the success of her previous single "Any Man of Mine". Twain has performed "The Woman in Me (Needs the Man in You)" on the Up! Tour, in a video interlude for the Now Tour and in a medley for the Come On Over Tour.

== Critical reception ==
Billboard magazine gave the single a mixed review, saying "she seems to gain some momentum on the chorus, but on the verses it seems like she doesn't quite get a vocal grasp on this song." Music & Media wrote, "With hubby producing, all conditions for a hit seem to be fulfilled. The formula used while working with Bryan Adams has now been adapted to country: a ballad with half of the title between brackets."

== Music video ==
The music video for "The Woman in Me" was shot in Cairo and Saqqara, Egypt and directed by Markus Blunder. It was filmed during the first week of July 1995 and released on August 9, 1995 on Country Music Television. In the video, Twain is riding around on a horse through the desert by the pyramids and riding a boat down the Nile River. She is also shown walking around through ancient ruins. To achieve the slow-motion movement while still keeping Shania's performance in sync with the audio, the song was sped up and performed at twice normal speed during shooting. In 1996, the video won the Favorite Video of the Year award at the Golden Pick Awards. The video is available on Twain's DVD The Platinum Collection.

== Chart performance ==
"The Woman in Me" debuted on the Billboard Hot Country Singles & Tracks chart the week of August 12, 1995 at number 65. At that time, her highest debut, a record previously held by "Any Man of Mine". It spent 20 weeks on the chart and climbed to a peak position of number 14 on November 4, 1995, where it remained for one week. "The Woman in Me" became Twain's third consecutive top twenty single. It peaked at number 74 on the Billboard Hot 100 with her next single "(If You're Not in It for Love) I'm Outta Here!".

== Official versions ==
- Album Version (4:50)
- Radio Edit (3:57)
- Steel Guitarless Mix/International Acoustic Version (4:50)
- Steel Guitarless Mix Edit/International Acoustic Version Radio Edit (4:03)

== Track listings ==
- US CD & Cassette single
1. "The Woman In Me (Needs The Man In You)" — 4:50
2. "(If You're Not In It For Love) I'm Outta Here!" — 4:30
- Australian CD single
1. "The Woman In Me (Needs The Man In You)" (Remix) — 4:03
2. "Whose Bed Have Your Boots Been Under?" (Dance Mix) — 4:54
3. "Leaving Is The Only Way Out" (LP Version) — 4:11
4. "The Woman In Me (Needs The Man In You)" (LP Version) — 4:51

== Charts ==
=== Weekly charts ===
Chart (1995)	Peak position
Canada Adult Contemporary (RPM)	22
Canada Country Singles (RPM)	1
US Billboard Hot 100	74^{1}
US Hot Country Songs (Billboard)	14
US Top Country Singles Sales (Billboard) with "(If You're Not in It for Love) I'm Outta Here!"	1

^{1} "(If You're Not in It for Love) I'm Outta Here!"/"The Woman in Me (Needs the Man in You)"

=== Year-end charts ===
Chart (1995)	Position
Canada Country Tracks (RPM)	1
