= You Win My Love =

- US promotional and Australian CD cover

Single by Shania Twain

from the album The Woman in Me
- B-side: "Home Ain't Where His Heart Is (Anymore)"; "(If You're Not in It for Love) I'm Outta Here!"; "If It Don't Take Two"
- Released: January 27, 1996
- Studio: Soundstage (Nashville, TN)
- Genre: Country pop; pop rock
- Length: 3:45
- Label: PolyGram; Mercury Nashville
- Songwriter: Robert John "Mutt" Lange
- Producer: Robert John "Mutt" Lange

Shania Twain singles chronology
"(If You're Not in It for Love) I'm Outta Here!" (1995)	"You Win My Love" (1996)	"No One Needs to Know" (1996)

Music video
- "You Win My Love" on YouTube

"You Win My Love" is a song recorded by Canadian country music singer Shania Twain. It was released on January 27, 1996, as the fifth single from her second studio album The Woman in Me. The song was written solely by then-husband and producer Robert John "Mutt" Lange, making it one of Twain's only songs she did not write. Lyrically, the song uses car metaphors to describe a fruitful relationship.

"You Win My Love" marked Twain's third and fifth number ones on the US Hot Country Songs and Canadian RPM Country Tracks chart, spending two and three weeks at number one respectively; notably, the song completely fell out the top ten after its two weeks at number one in the US. Like prior single "(If You're Not in It for Love) I'm Outta Here!", the song was remixed by Mutt Lange for international audiences; it was later released in Australia in 1997. Twain performed the song on both the Come On Over Tour and Rock This Country Tour and both of her Vegas residencies.

== Critical reception ==
Kevin John Coyne of Country Universe rated the song a B+, saying it has enough hooks to "make ABBA blush."

== Music video ==
Twain in a race car for the "You Win My Love" video

The music video for "You Win My Love" was shot in Orlando, Florida and directed by Steven Goldmann. It was filmed on January 14 and 15, 1996 and debuted on CMT on January 27 of that same year. The video is set at a race track where Twain drives around in a go-kart in a skin-tight leather outfit, and is based on the lyrics to the song which are vehicle-related. Two versions of the video were released, one with the 'Album Version' and one with the 'Mutt Lange Mix'. The 'Mutt Lange Mix' version is available on Twain's DVD The Platinum Collection, while the 'Album Version' is available on YouTube.

== Chart performance ==
"You Win My Love" debuted on the Billboard Hot Country Singles & Tracks chart the week of February 24, 1996, at number 47, garnering the "Hot Shot Debut" note. It would top the chart the week of May 4, 1996, becoming her third-number one single following "Any Man of Mine" and "I'm Outta Here!"; it is also the only of her seven number one singles she did not have a writer's credit on. It spent 20 weeks in total. The track was also released commercially, where it would reach number eight on the Bubbling Under Hot 100 chart; combining with the mainline Billboard Hot 100, "You Win My Love" peaked at number 108.

"You Win My Love" debuted at number 67 on the Canadian RPM Country Tracks chart on the week of February 19, 1996. The song went on to reach the top spot of the chart the week of April 8, 1996, where it spent three weeks at the top spot, marking Twain's fifth consecutive number one song in her home country. "You Win My Love" was also released in Australia in its remix form, where Twain had previous success with the remix of "I'm Outta Here!"; it was not successful however, only peaking at number 67.

== Official versions ==
- Album Version (4:26)
- Radio Edit (3:45)
- Mutt Lange Mix (4:40)
- Mutt Lange Mix Edit (3:54)
- Still the One: Live from Vegas version (4:33)

== Track listings ==
All major releases of "You Win My Love" as noted.

US promotional CD single

1. "You Win My Love" (Edit Version) – 3:46
2. "You Win My Love" (Edit Version) – 3:46
3. "You Win My Love" (Album Version) – 4:26

US CD and cassette single

1. "You Win My Love" – 4:26
2. "Home Ain't Where His Heart Is (Anymore)" – 4:12

Australian CD single

1. "You Win My Love" (Mutt Lange Mix) – 3:57
2. "You Win My Love" (Album Version) – 4:26
3. "If It Don't Take Two" – 3:40

Alternate Australian CD single and cassette single

1. "You Win My Love" (Mutt Lange Mix) – 3:57
2. "You Win My Love" (Album Version) – 4:26
3. "If It Don't Take Two" – 3:40
4. "(If You're Not In It For Love) I'm Outta Here!" – 4:27

== Charts ==
=== Weekly charts ===
Weekly chart performance for "You Win My Love"
Chart (1996)	Peak position
Australia (ARIA)	67
Canada Country Singles (RPM)	1
US Bubbling Under Hot 100 (Billboard)	8
US Hot Country Songs (Billboard)	1
US Top Country Singles Sales (Billboard)	2
US Country Top 50 (Radio & Records)	1

=== Year-end charts ===
Year-end chart performance for "You Win My Love"
Chart (1996)	Position
Canada Country Tracks (RPM)	3
US Country Songs (Billboard)	11
