= The Woman in Me (album) =

Studio album by Shania Twain
- Released: February 7, 1995
- Recorded: 1994–1995
- Studios: Sound Stage (Nashville); Battery Studios (Nashville); Javelina (Nashville); Recording Arts (Nashville); A.R.P. Track Productions (St. Anne Des Lacs, Quebec, Canada)
- Genres: Country; pop
- Length: 48:08
- Labels: PolyGram; Mercury
- Producer: Robert John "Mutt" Lange

Shania Twain chronology
Shania Twain (1993)	The Woman in Me (1995)	Come On Over (1997)

Singles from The Woman in Me
- 1. "Whose Bed Have Your Boots Been Under?" Released: January 2, 1995; 2. "Any Man of Mine" Released: May 8, 1995; 3. "The Woman in Me (Needs the Man in You)" Released: August 9, 1995; 4. "(If You're Not in It for Love) I'm Outta Here!" Released: November 15, 1995; 5. "You Win My Love" Released: January 26, 1996; 6. "No One Needs to Know" Released: May 15, 1996; 7. "Home Ain't Where His Heart Is (Anymore)" Released: July 29, 1996; 8. "God Bless the Child" Released: October 26, 1996

Alternative cover
- 2000 European re-release

Professional ratings
Review scores
Source	Rating
AllMusic	4.5/5 stars
Entertainment Weekly	F
The Rolling Stone Album Guide	4/5 stars
The Village Voice	C

The Woman in Me is the second studio album by Canadian country singer-songwriter Shania Twain and her first to be produced by long-time collaborator and then-husband Robert John "Mutt" Lange. Released on February 7, 1995, it went on to become her biggest-selling recording at the time, selling 4 million copies by the end of the year, and was eventually certified 12× Platinum by the Recording Industry Association of America (RIAA) on December 1, 2000, for 12 million shipments throughout the United States. The album has sold an estimated 20 million copies worldwide. It was ranked number 8 on CMT's list of 40 Greatest Albums in Country Music in 2006. The album is credited with having influenced the sound of contemporary country music. Eight singles were released from the album for its promotion, including "Whose Bed Have Your Boots Been Under?", "Any Man of Mine", "(If You're Not in It for Love) I'm Outta Here!" and "You Win My Love", with each accompanied by a music video.

== Background ==
By 1993, Shania Twain was promoting her self-titled debut album by singing at local gigs in the United States with little more than a backing track CD. While the album itself did not perform well in the charts, it attracted the attention of rock producer Robert John "Mutt" Lange, and the pair began having long-distance telephone conversations with each other. They bonded over Twain's love of rock music and Lange's love of American country music. After meeting with him at the CMA Music Festival/Fan Fair in June 1993, they began exchanging song ideas with each other and started doing songwriting together. During this time, they developed a romance that culminated in their wedding on December 28, 1993.

It was at this time that Twain was pressed by her record company to return to the studio to start putting together her second album. Twain admitted in her From This Moment On memoir that although she was initially reluctant to do so, she told Luke Lewis that she had co-written some songs with Lange, and he agreed to let her record some demos for her album, even though he feared that Twain would deviate too much from the Nashville sound. Twain and Lange continued their songwriting after their wedding and in early 1994, constructed a demo tape produced by Lange of some of their songs which was played to record executives for the first time at Morin Heights Studio. Although some executives were worried because the "less country" sound was different from Twain's debut, Lewis decided to let Twain continue her collaboration with Lange, and hired Lange as the primary producer of the album.

== Composition and single releases ==
"Whose Bed Have Your Boots Been Under?", a country-flavored song about a woman confronting her lover about his frequent infidelity, was released as the first single from the album. Originally, Twain wanted "Any Man of Mine", a song containing both heavy rock and heavy country influences, to be the first single, but was persuaded to change her mind and go with the safer option. While "Whose Bed Have Your Boots Been Under?" slowly gained some attention on the country charts, it was "Any Man of Mine" which gave Twain her first country Top 10 and Number 1 hit, as well as her first appearance on the Billboard Hot 100, peaking at number 31. The third single is Twain's sentimental ballad and the title track "The Woman in Me (Needs the Man in You)", and became her first adult contemporary hit, accompanied by a video shot in Egypt. It also peaked at number 74 on the Billboard Hot 100.

"God Bless the Child", an a cappella prayer that Twain prayed to herself after her parents died, was originally the last track recorded for the album in 1994. However, in early 1995, just prior to the album release, Twain and Lange experimented with recording different versions of songs for both country audiences and pop-rock audiences. This meant that the two songs in consideration, the fourth single "(If You're Not in It for Love) I'm Outta Here!", described by Twain as "a warning to pickup artists everywhere, set to a pulsating rock beat, and embroidered with slinky slide guitar" and fifth single "You Win My Love", a solely Lange-written love song involving car metaphors, actually had their country and pop-rock counterparts recorded at the same time. Just before the track-listing was finalised, separate country and pop-rock mixes were derived from the original masters, as Twain and Lange intended to release both mixes to the release formats of the album. The pop-rock mixes were shelved in favor of the country mixes during the album's release, but returned billed as "Mutt Lange Mix"es for both songs' single releases. "I'm Outta Here!" and "You Win My Love" became Twain's second and third No.1 hits at country radio, while "I'm Outta Here!" became Twain's first breakthrough hit in Australia. "I'm Outta Here" also peaked at number 74 on the Billboard Hot 100.

After more success with another No.1 hit, sixth single "No One Needs to Know", which was selected for the soundtrack to the 1996 film Twister, and a minor country hit, seventh single "Home Ain't Where His Heart Is (Anymore)", Twain decided to turn "God Bless the Child", the eighth and final single, into a full-length song. She and Lange co-wrote new verses touching on the turbulent lives in people's society, and Lange developed two new instrumentals for Twain to record her vocals on: a country version with a banjo and a pop version with a subtle electronic beat. Both versions contain the same acoustic drum set, guitars and chord arrangements, and also feature the Fisk University Jubilee singers and a local performing arts choir on backing vocals. "God Bless the Child" peaked at number 75 on the Billboard Hot 100, but was her least successful single from the album at country radio, peaking at number 48.

== 25th Anniversary ==
On October 2, 2020, The Woman in Me was re-released as the "Diamond Edition", which is available in four variants: a limited edition clear crystal vinyl, standard vinyl, 2-CD set and a 3-CD set packaged with a 48-page hard cover book. It is also available as a digital download known as the "Super Deluxe Edition". The Diamond Edition is "remastered" with a bonus disc that includes live performances and the single mixes. The 3-CD Set (also the Super Deluxe Edition digital download) version includes a third disc with early recordings of The Woman in Me, which were recorded 12 months prior to the release of the album.

== Track listing ==
All tracks are written by Shania Twain and Robert John "Mutt" Lange, except where noted.

Standard edition
No.	Title	Length
1.	"Home Ain't Where His Heart Is (Anymore)"	4:12
2.	"Any Man of Mine"	4:06
3.	"Whose Bed Have Your Boots Been Under?"	4:25
4.	"(If You're Not in It for Love) I'm Outta Here!"	4:30
5.	"The Woman in Me (Needs the Man in You)"	4:50
6.	"Is There Life After Love?"	4:39
7.	"If It Don't Take Two"	3:40
8.	"You Win My Love" (Lange)	4:26
9.	"Raining on Our Love"	4:38
10.	"Leaving Is the Only Way Out" (Twain)	4:07
11.	"No One Needs to Know"	3:04
12.	"God Bless the Child"	1:30
Total length:		48:08

Diamond Edition CD 2 – Live & Remixed
No.	Title	Length
1.	"You Win My Love" (Live From Vegas)	4:52
2.	"No One Needs to Know" (Live From Vegas)	4:16
3.	"Any Man of Mine" (Live From Vegas)	4:08
4.	"Whose Bed Have Your Boots Been Under?" (Live From Vegas)	4:42
5.	"(If You're Not in It for Love) I'm Outta Here!" (Live From Vegas)	4:57
6.	"Whose Bed Have Your Boots Been Under?" (Dance Mix)	4:48
7.	"Any Man of Mine" (Alternate Mix – Without Steel Guitar)	4:15
8.	"The Woman in Me (Needs the Man in You)" (International Acoustic Version – Without Steel Guitar)	4:41
9.	"(If You're Not in It for Love) I'm Outta Here!" (Dance Mix)	4:41
10.	"(If You're Not in It for Love) I'm Outta Here!" (Mutt Lange Mix)	4:22
11.	"You Win My Love" (Mutt Lange Mix)	4:40
12.	"God Bless the Child" (Single Mix – Country Version)	3:53
13.	"God Bless the Child" (Single Mix – Without Banjo)	3:51
14.	"(If You're Not in It for Love) I'm Outta Here!" (Live/DirecTV Mix)	7:08
15.	"Home Ain't Where His Heart Is (Anymore)"/"The Woman in Me (Needs the Man in You)"/"You've Got a Way" (Medley – Live/DirecTV Mix)	7:26
Total length:		72:40

Diamond Edition CD 3 – Shania Vocal Mix
No.	Title	Length
1.	"Home Ain't Where His Heart Is (Anymore)" (Shania Vocal Mix)	4:19
2.	"The Woman in Me (Needs the Man in You)" (Shania Vocal Mix)	4:48
3.	"No One Needs to Know" (Shania Vocal Mix)	3:09
4.	"Whose Bed Have Your Boots Been Under?" (Shania Vocal Mix)	4:41
5.	"Is There Life After Love?" (Shania Vocal Mix)	4:43
6.	"If It Don't Take Two" (Shania Vocal Mix)	3:57
7.	"You Win My Love" (Shania Vocal Mix)	4:33
8.	"Any Man of Mine" (Shania Vocal Mix)	4:15
9.	"Raining On Our Love" (Shania Vocal Mix)	4:36
10.	"(If You're Not in It for Love) I'm Outta Here!" (Shania Vocal Mix)	4:36
11.	"Leaving Is the Only Way Out" (Shania Vocal Mix)	4:10
Total length:		47:47

European, Australian and Taiwanese reissue edition bonus tracks
No.	Title	Length
13.	"You Win My Love" (Mutt Lange Mix Edit)	3:54
14.	"Home Ain't Where His Heart Is (Anymore)"/"The Woman in Me (Needs the Man in You)"/"You've Got a Way" (Medley - Live/DirecTV Mix)	7:25
15.	"(If You're Not in It for Love) I'm Outta Here!" (Mutt Lange Mix)	4:21
16.	"God Bless the Child" (video)	3:48
Total length:		67:36

Australian Collector's Edition bonus disc
No.	Title	Length
1.	"(If You're Not in It for Love) I'm Outta Here!" (Mutt Lange Mix)	4:21
2.	"(If You're Not in It for Love) I'm Outta Here!" (Dance Mix)	4:39
3.	"You Win My Love" (Mutt Lange Mix)	3:54
4.	"God Bless the Child" (Single Mix)	3:52
5.	"The Woman in Me (Needs the Man in You)" (International Acoustic Version - Without Steel Guitar)	4:40
Total length:		21:26

== Personnel ==
Credits from album liner notes.

- Sam Bush – mandolin
- Larry Byrom – acoustic guitar, electric rhythm guitar
- Billy Crain – slide guitar
- Glen Duncan – fiddle
- Dann Huff – tic tac bass, lead guitar, electric guitar, slide guitar, guitar textures, wa-wa guitar (sic), jangle guitar, claps
- Paul Franklin – pedal steel guitar, Pedabro
- Rob Hajacos – fiddle
- Ronn Huff – string arrangements
- John Hughey – pedal steel guitar
- David Hungate – bass guitar, fretless bass, double bass
- John Barlow Jarvis – piano, Wurlitzer electric piano
- Nick Keca – claps
- Robert John "Mutt" Lange – backing vocals, claps
- Paul Leim – drums, percussion, tambourine, shaker, door slam on "(If You're Not in It for Love) I'm Outta Here!"
- Brent Mason – lead guitar, electric guitar, six-string bass guitar
- Terry McMillan – percussion, cowbell, harmonica, boot stomps on "Whose Bed Have Your Boots Been Under?"
- Hargus "Pig" Robbins – piano
- Brent Rowan – electric guitar textures
- Joe Spivey – fiddle
- Shania Twain – lead and backing vocals, claps, footsteps on "(If You're Not in It for Love) I'm Outta Here!"
- Nashville String Machine – string section

=== Recording personnel ===
- Robert Charles – assistant overdub engineer
- Lee Groitzsch – overdub engineer
- Nick Keca – engineer
- Robert John "Mutt" Lange – producer
- Wayne Morgan – assistant overdub engineer
- Lynn Peterzell - engineer
- Warren Peterson – engineer
- Simon Pressey – engineer
- Ron "Snake" Reynolds – engineer
- Brian Tankersly – overdub engineer
- Craig White – assistant engineer

== Singles chronology ==
=== US Country ===
1. "Whose Bed Have Your Boots Been Under?"
2. "Any Man of Mine"
3. "The Woman in Me (Needs the Man in You)"
4. "(If You're Not in It for Love) I'm Outta Here!"
5. "You Win My Love"
6. "No One Needs to Know"
7. "Home Ain't Where His Heart Is (Anymore)"
8. "God Bless the Child" (Single Mix - Country Version)

=== Europe ===
1. "Any Man of Mine"
2. "The Woman in Me (Needs the Man in You)"
3. "(If You're Not in It for Love) I'm Outta Here!"
4. "You Win My Love"
5. "No One Needs to Know"
6. "God Bless the Child" (Single Mix - Pop Version)

=== Australia Pop ===
1. "The Woman In Me (Needs the Man in You)"
2. "(If You're Not in It for Love) I'm Outta Here!" (Mutt Lange Mix)
3. "You Win My Love" (Mutt Lange Mix)
4. "No One Needs to Know"

== Charts ==
=== Weekly charts ===
Weekly chart performance for The Woman in Me
Chart (1995–2020)	Peak position
Australian Albums (ARIA)	17
Canada Top Albums/CDs (RPM)	6
Canadian Albums (The Record)	7
Canadian Country Albums (RPM)	1
Dutch Albums (Album Top 100)	46
European Albums (Top 100)	35
German Albums (Offizielle Top 100)	72
Irish Albums (IRMA)	60
New Zealand Albums (RMNZ)	38
Norwegian Albums (VG-lista)	5
Scottish Albums (Official Charts)	3
Swiss Albums (Schweizer Hitparade)	91
UK Albums (Official Charts)	7
UK Country Albums (Official Charts)	1
US Billboard 200	5
US Top Country Albums (Billboard)	1
US Top Catalog Albums (Billboard)	1

=== Decade-end charts ===
Decade-end chart performance for The Woman in Me
Chart (1990–99)	Position
US Billboard 200	38

=== All-time charts ===
All-time chart performance for The Woman in Me
Chart	Position
US Top Country Albums (Billboard)	9

=== Year-end charts ===
Year-end chart performance for The Woman in Me
Chart (1995)	Position
Canada Top Albums/CDs (RPM)	8
Canadian Country Albums (RPM)	2
US Billboard 200	19
US Top Country Albums (Billboard)	2

Chart (1996)	Position
Canada Top Albums/CDs (RPM)	24
Canadian Country Albums (RPM)	1
US Billboard 200	6
US Top Country Albums (Billboard)	1

Chart (1997)	Position
Australian Albums (ARIA)	60
Canadian Albums (SoundScan)	77
Canadian Country Albums (RPM)	6
US Billboard 200	147
US Top Country Albums (Billboard)	19
US Top Catalog Albums (Billboard)	29
US Top Country Catalog Albums (Billboard)	3

Chart (1998)	Position
US Top Catalog Albums (Billboard)	9
US Top Country Catalog Albums (Billboard)	1

Chart (1999)	Position
US Top Catalog Albums (Billboard)	4

Chart (2000)	Position
UK Albums (OCC)	56

Chart (2001)	Position
Canadian Country Albums (Nielsen SoundScan)	55

Chart (2002)	Position
Canadian Country Albums (Nielsen SoundScan)	61

== Certifications ==
Certifications for The Woman in Me
Region	Certification	Certified units/sales
Australia (ARIA)	3× Platinum	210,000^{^}
Canada (Music Canada)	2× Diamond	2,000,000^{^}
United Kingdom (BPI)	Platinum	381,344
United States (RIAA)	12× Platinum	12,000,000^{^}
^{^} Shipments figures based on certification alone.

== Awards ==
- Canadian Country Music Association Awards (CCMA's):
  - Album of the Year (1995)
  - Special Achievement Award (Top selling album by a female country artist ever) (1997)
  - Top Selling Album (1997)
- Academy of Country Music Awards (ACMA's): Album of the Year (1996)
- Billboard Music Awards: Country Album of the Year (1996)
- Golden Pick Awards: Favorite Album (1996)
- Grammy Awards: Best Country Album (1996)
- Radio & Records' Trade Magazine Poll: Best Country Album (1996)
- RPM's Big Country Music Awards - (Canada): Album of the Year (1996)
- CMT's 40 Greatest Albums in Country Music number 8 in 2006, the highest rank by a woman in that list.

== See also ==
- List of best-selling albums by women
- List of best-selling albums in the United States

== Release history ==
Release history and formats for The Woman in Me
Region	Date	Format	Label
United States, Canada	February 7, 1995	CD, cassette	Mercury Nashville
Australia	February 20, 1995	CD, cassette	Polygram, Mercury Nashville
Australia	1997	2× CD Collector's edition	Polygram, Mercury Nashville
UK, Europe	May, 2000	CD re-issue	Mercury Nashville
United States	October 14, 2016	LP vinyl	Mercury Nashville
United States	October 2, 2020	Diamond Edition LP, 2× CD, 3× CD Box Set	Mercury Nashville
