= Don't Be Stupid (You Know I Love You) =

1997 single by Shania Twain

- North American cover

Single by Shania Twain

from the album Come On Over
- B-side: "You've Got a Way"; "If It Don't Take Two"; "Man! I Feel Like a Woman!"; "(If You're Not in It for Love) I'm Outta Here!"
- Released: November 10, 1997
- Studio: Masterfonics (Nashville, Tennessee)
- Genre: Country pop (original album version); hi-NRG; Eurobeat (dance mix single video edit)
- Length: 3:35 (original album version); 3:38 (dance mix single video edit)
- Label: Mercury
- Songwriters: Robert John "Mutt" Lange; Shania Twain
- Producer: Robert John "Mutt" Lange

Shania Twain singles chronology
| "Love Gets Me Every Time" (1997) | "Don't Be Stupid (You Know I Love You)" (1997) | "You're Still the One" (1998) |

Music video
- "Don’t Be Stupid (You Know I Love You)" on YouTube

"Don't Be Stupid (You Know I Love You)" is a song by Canadian singer Shania Twain, written by her and then-husband Robert John "Mutt" Lange, who also produced it. The track was released to country radio by Mercury Records on November 10, 1997, as the second single from Twain's third studio album, Come On Over (1997). Internationally, it was released as the seventh single.

The track received mixed reviews from music critics, who questioned why Twain released an "oddly disposable single." Additionally, the track's dance-pop's remix, which was the version released for European and Australian audiences, was compared to Swedish group Rednex's single "Cotton Eye Joe" (1994). Commercially, the track reached number six on the US Billboard Hot Country Singles & Tracks chart and topped the Canadian RPM 100 Country Tracks chart for one week. Internationally, it reached number five on the UK Singles Chart and also entered the top 10 in Hungary and Romania.

== Composition ==
According to the sheet music published at Musicnotes.com by Songs of Polygram International, Inc., "Don't Be Stupid" is written in the key of D major with Shania Twain's vocals spanning from A_{3} to B_{5}. The song moves at a moderate tempo.

== Music video ==
In June 1997, Twain held auditions for clog dancers. In August 1997, it was reported that Larry Jordan would be directing the music video, which Twain confirmed herself in early October 1997. From October 18 to 19 of that year, the music video was shot and it debuted on November 12, 1997 on CMT. The video is set on a stage that is covered in water, and Twain is accompanied by backup Irish dancers following the Riverdance trend of the time and children playing fiddles. By the end of the video, the sprinklers come on, and everyone, including Twain and the Riverdancers, are soaked. "Don't Be Stupid" won the Video of the Year award at the 1998 Canadian Country Music Awards. Three versions of the video exist, the 'Original Album Version', and one released in Europe in 2000 of the 'Dance Mix Single' are the most common. The 'Original Album Version' is available on Twain's compilations Come On Over: Video Collection (1999) and The Platinum Collection (2001). The 'Dance Mix' version is available on iTunes and YouTube.

== Reception ==
=== Critical reception ===
The track received mixed reviews from music critics. Billboard magazine negatively reviewed it, calling the single a "weak song" but predicted it would do well commercially nonetheless; they criticized the immaturity of the song's lyrics and said the production was subpar. Can't Stop the Pop however reviewed the song's dance mix positively, saying "it is utterly bonkers – in the best way possible." Kevin John Coyne of Country Universe reviewed and rated both versions. For the country version, he rated it a "B", saying that the song "had a nice Celtic flavor" although criticized it as showcasing Twain "at her silliest." For the dance mix, he rated it a "B+", saying, "Basically, they turned it into “Cotton Eye Joe”, making the original version a little more stupid but a lot more lovable."

=== Chart performance ===
"Don't Be Stupid" debuted at number 51 on the US Billboard Hot Country Singles & Tracks chart the week of November 15, 1997, the highest debut of the week. The single spent 20 weeks on the chart and peaked at number six on January 31, 1998, where it remained for two weeks. It also reached number two on the Billboard Top Country Singles Sales chart. The single became Twain's sixth top-10 single and her eighth top-20 hit. "Don't Be Stupid" became Twain's sixth song on the Billboard Hot 100 where it peaked at number 40. It reached number 25 on the Hot 100 Singles Sales chart. In Canada, the song reached number 12.

"Don't Be Stupid" became Twain's fourth-biggest single in the UK. It also became her fourth consecutive top-10 single there (and fifth overall) when it debuted on February 26, 2000, at its peak of number five. It remained on the chart for 11 weeks. It has sold 155,000 copies in the UK.

== Track listings ==
Canadian and US single

1. "Don't Be Stupid (You Know I Love You)" – 3:35
2. "If It Don't Take Two" – 3:40

Australasian CD single

1. "Don't Be Stupid (You Know I Love You)" (dance mix single) – 4:11
2. "Man! I Feel Like a Woman!" (Live/Direct TV mix) – 3:57
3. "You've Got a Way" (Love to Infinity's soul classic) – 6:00
4. "Don't Be Stupid (You Know I Love You)" (LP version) – 3:35
5. "Don't Be Stupid (You Know I Love You)" (dance mix full length) – 4:46
6. "Don't Be Stupid (You Know I Love You)" (enhanced video clip)

European CD single

1. "Don't Be Stupid (You Know I Love You)" (dance mix single) – 4:11
2. "You've Got a Way" (Notting Hill Remix) – 3:25

European maxi-CD single

1. "Don't Be Stupid (You Know I Love You)" (dance mix single) – 4:11
2. "You've Got a Way" (Notting Hill Remix) – 3:25
3. "Don't Be Stupid (You Know I Love You)" (dance mix full length) – 4:43
4. "Don't Be Stupid (You Know I Love You)" (LP version) – 3:34

UK CD single

1. "Don't Be Stupid (You Know I Love You)" (dance mix)
2. "Don't Be Stupid (You Know I Love You)" (international LP version)
3. "(If You're Not in It for Love) I'm Outta Here!" (dance mix)
4. "Don't Be Stupid (You Know I Love You)" (video)

UK cassette single

1. "Don't Be Stupid (You Know I Love You)" (dance mix)
2. "Don't Be Stupid (You Know I Love You)" (international LP version)

== Credits and personnel ==
Credits are taken from the Come On Over album booklet.

Studio

- Recorded and mastered at Masterfonics (Nashville, Tennessee)

Personnel

- Shania Twain – writing, vocals, background vocals
- Robert John "Mutt" Lange – writing, background vocals, production
- Biff Watson – guitars
- Dann Huff – guitars, guitar textures, six-string bass, talk box
- Brent Mason – electric guitar
- Paul Franklin – pedal steel guitar
- Joe Chemay – electric and fretless bass
- Larry Franklin – fiddle
- Bow Bros – gang fiddles
- John Jarvis – Wurlitzer
- Paul Leim – drums
- Mike Shipley – mixing
- Olle Romo – programming, Pro Tools, sequencing, editing
- Glenn Meadows – mastering

== Charts ==
=== Weekly charts ===
| Chart (1997–2000) | Peak position |
|---|---|
| Australia (ARIA) | 32 |
| Belgium (Ultratip Bubbling Under Flanders) | 6 |
| Canada (Nielsen SoundScan) | 12 |
| Canada Country Singles (RPM) | 1 |
| Europe (European Hot 100 Singles) | 24 |
| Hungary (Mahasz) | 5 |
| Ireland (IRMA) | 15 |
| Netherlands (Dutch Top 40) | 29 |
| Netherlands (Single Top 100) | 19 |
| New Zealand (Recorded Music NZ) | 42 |
| Romania (Romanian Top 100) | 5 |
| Scottish Singles Sales (Official Charts) | 5 |
| Spain (Radio Top 40) | 17 |
| Sweden (Sverigetopplistan) | 39 |
| UK Singles (Official Charts) | 5 |
| US Billboard Hot 100 | 40 |
| US Hot Country Songs (Billboard) | 6 |
| US Top Country Singles Sales (Billboard) | 2 |

=== Year-end charts ===
| Chart (1998) | Position |
|---|---|
| Canada Country Tracks (RPM) | 4 |
| US Hot Country Singles & Tracks (Billboard) | 54 |

| Chart (2000) | Position |
|---|---|
| Romania (Romanian Top 100) | 64 |
| UK Singles (OCC) | 148 |

== Certifications ==
| Region | Certification | Certified units/sales |
|---|---|---|
| United Kingdom (BPI) | Silver | 200,000^{‡} |
^{‡} Sales+streaming figures based on certification alone.

== Release history ==
| Region | Date | Format(s) | Label(s) | Ref. |
|---|---|---|---|---|
| United States | November 10, 1997 | Country radio | Mercury | |
| United States | November 11, 1997 | 7-inch vinyl; CD; cassette | Mercury | |
| Canada | November 11, 1997 | CD | Mercury | |
| United Kingdom | February 14, 2000 | CD; cassette | Mercury | |
