= No One Needs to Know =

1996 single by Shania Twain

Single by Shania Twain

from the album The Woman in Me
- B-side: "Leaving Is the Only Way Out"
- Released: May 15, 1996
- Studio: A.R.P. Track Productions (Sainte-Anne-des-Lacs, Quebec, Canada); Sound Stage Recording Studios (Nashville, TN)
- Genre: Country pop
- Length: 3:04
- Label: PolyGram; Mercury Nashville
- Songwriters: Robert John "Mutt" Lange; Shania Twain
- Producer: Robert John "Mutt" Lange

Shania Twain singles chronology
"You Win My Love" (1996)	"No One Needs to Know" (1996)	"Home Ain't Where His Heart Is (Anymore)" (1996)

Music video
- "No One Needs to Know" on YouTube

"No One Needs to Know" is a song co-written and recorded by Canadian country music artist Shania Twain. It was released on May 15, 1996 as the sixth single from her second studio album The Woman in Me. The song was written by Twain and then husband and producer Robert John "Mutt" Lange. Twain composed the song while working and performing at the Deerhurst Resort in Ontario, Canada. The song was featured in the 1996 film Twister and was also included in the film's soundtrack. It was also the only single from The Woman in Me to not be commercially released; it was included as a b-side in the Australian release of "(If You're Not in It for Love) I'm Outta Here!".

"No One Needs to Know" marked Twain's third consecutive single to top both the Billboard Hot Country Singles & Tracks and Canadian RPM Country Tracks, spending one and two weeks atop the charts; overall, it was her fourth US number one and sixth Canadian number one. Twain later included the song on her 2004 Greatest Hits compilation. She has performed the song on four of her tours and both of her Vegas residencies.

== Critical reception ==
Billboard reviewed the single favorably, calling it "an infectious concoction that boasts a lighter, fresher sound than her previous outings". They also stated that the "harmonica-accented production has a cool kind of retro feel" which "should help her sell a few more records".

== Music video ==
The music video for "No One Needs to Know" was filmed in Spring Hill, Tennessee, and directed by Steven Goldmann. It was filmed on April 3, 1996, and released on May 15, 1996, on CMT. The video consists of Twain and a backing band playing at a rather large farm house, while a tornado (filmed by Charles Robertson) arrives, coinciding with the theme of the Twister movie. One version of the video contains scenes from the movie, while another, the 'Performance Only' version is just of Twain and the band. The 'Performance Only' version of the video is available on Twain's DVD The Platinum Collection. Both videos start with a brief "rehearsal", during which Twain gives instructions to the band, they play a few bars and Twain mixes up the lyrics.

== Personnel ==
Personnel are lifted from The Woman in Me liner notes.

- Larry Byrom – acoustic guitar
- Glen Duncan – fiddle
- Dan Huff – electric guitar, baritone guitar
- John Hughey – pedal steel guitar
- David Hungate – bass guitar
- John Barlow Jarvis – electric piano
- Mutt Lange – harmony vocals
- Paul Leim – drums, percussion
- Brent Mason – electric guitar
- Terry McMillan – harmonica
- Brent Rowan – electric guitar
- Shania Twain – lead and harmony vocals

== Chart performance ==
"No One Needs to Know" debuted on the Billboard Hot Country Singles & Tracks chart the week of May 11, 1996, at number 62. The song spent 20 weeks on the chart and climbed to the top spot on July 13, 1996, where it remained for one week. The single became Twain's fourth number-one single (third consecutive), fourth Top 10 single, and sixth consecutive Top 20 single. "No One Needs to Know" became Twain's fastest climbing single to reach number one when it did so in ten weeks, a record previously held by both "Any Man of Mine" and "You Win My Love" when they made number-one in eleven weeks.

"No One Needs to Know" debuted at number 44 on the Radio & Records Country Top 50 chart the week of May 3, 1996. The song reached the number one spot on the week on July 5, 1996, marking Twain's third consecutive number one and sixth consecutive top ten hit on the chart. It spent 12 weeks overall on the chart.

"No One Needs to Know" debuted at number 68 on the Canadian RPM Country Tracks on the week of May 20, 1996. Eight weeks later on July 15, 1996, the song reached the top spot of the chart. It spent two consecutive weeks atop the chart and marked Twain's sixth consecutive number one hit in her home country; The Woman in Me broke a record for the most number one hits at Canada country.

== Charts ==
Chart (1996)	Peak position
Canada Country Singles (RPM)	1
US Hot Country Songs (Billboard)	1

=== Year-end charts ===
Chart (1996)	Position
Canada Country Tracks (RPM)	8
US Country Songs (Billboard)	7
