= (If You're Not in It for Love) I'm Outta Here! =

1995 single by Shania Twain

Single by Shania Twain

from the album The Woman in Me
- B-side: "The Woman in Me (Needs the Man in You)"; "If It Don't Take Two"; "No One Needs to Know"; "God Bless the Child"
- Released: November 15, 1995
- Studio: A.R.P. Track Productions (Sainte-Anne-des-Lacs, Quebec); Sound Stage (Nashville, Tennessee)
- Genre: Country pop; pop rock
- Length: 3:48
- Label: Mercury Nashville
- Songwriters: Robert John "Mutt" Lange; Shania Twain
- Producer: Robert John "Mutt" Lange

Shania Twain singles chronology
| "The Woman in Me (Needs the Man in You)" (1995) | "(If You're Not in It for Love) I'm Outta Here!" (1995) | "You Win My Love" (1996) |

Music video
- "(If You're Not In It For Love) I'm Outta Here!" on YouTube

"(If You're Not in It for Love) I'm Outta Here!" is a song co-written and recorded by Canadian country music singer Shania Twain. It was released on November 15, 1995, as the fourth single from her second studio album, The Woman in Me. Written by Twain and then-husband and producer Robert John "Mutt" Lange, the song is lyrically a warning to "pickup artists" who are searching for one-night stands instead of real love.

The song topped the Canadian RPM 100 Country Tracks chart and the US Billboard Hot Country Singles & Tracks chart for six and two weeks, respectively. An alternate mix by Lange was released in Australia in November 1996, peaking at number five on the ARIA Singles Chart. "I'm Outta Here!" was later included on Twain's 2004 Greatest Hits package, and has been performed on all of her tours. In 1997, the Eurodance group Real McCoy covered "I'm Outta Here!".

== Chart performance ==
"I'm Outta Here!" debuted at number 69 on the US Billboard Hot Country Singles & Tracks chart the week of November 18, 1995. It spent 20 weeks on the chart and peaked at number one on February 3, 1996, where it remained for two weeks; it marked her second number one country hit after "Any Man of Mine". The song also topped the Country Singles Sales chart for one week. Released as a double a-side single with the title track, "I'm Outta Here!" debuted on the all-genre Billboard Hot 100 on November 28, 1995, at number 90. The song later reached a peak of number 74 on the January 6, 1996, issue; "I'm Outta Here!" marked Twain's second Hot 100 entry after the double a-side single "Any Man Of Mine/Whose Bed Have Your Boots Been Under?".

In Twain's native Canada, "I'm Outta Here!" debuted at number 77 on the Canadian RPM Country Tracks chart on November 20, 1995. "I'm Outta Here!" rose quickly to number one, where it reached on January 8, 1996. The song spent six consecutive weeks at number one, only tying with "Love Gets Me Every Time" to being Twain's longest run at the top of the chart. The song also made an appearance on the RPM Adult Contemporary Chart, peaking at number 49 on March 4, 1996.

Whilst previous singles like "You Lay a Whole Lot of Love on Me" and "The Woman in Me (Needs the Man in You)" were released internationally, "I'm Outta Here was Twain's first successful single outside North America. The song became a particular hit in Australia, where an alternate version remixed by Mutt Lange was released instead. "I'm Outta Here!" debuted at number 37 on the ARIA Singles Chart on November 24, 1996. It climbed to its peak position of number five on January 26, 1997, where it remained for two weeks. It spent a total of 22 weeks on the chart.

== Music video ==
The music video for "I'm Outta Here!" was shot in New York City and directed by Steven Goldmann. It was filmed on November 4, 1995, and released 11 days later. The video is radically different from Twain's previous videos, and its pop rock feel and sex appeal engendered into most of Twain's subsequent videos.

The video begins with a shot of Twain standing behind a blue light in front of a man sitting on a chair. She walks up to the man, who stands up and flips over his chair, meanwhile, the video cuts to a slow-motion shot of people dancing in a club and a shot of Twain walking up to a microphone in front of her and surrounded by many people playing drums. It cuts back to Twain trying to sit on the chair, when the man kicks it away for her to fall on the floor. But the next shot of them is them laughing and pushing away as people start to come over. In the subsequent shots, intercut with shots of Twain performing alone without the drums, Twain and several others drumming near a window, and Twain on a balcony, friends grab the microphone off of Twain and engage in a karaoke session with her, male stereotypes try to turn on Twain near the microphone, Twain teaches people a dance routine, people play air guitar with fake guitars, and Twain plays along to the drummers. In the final shot, Twain walks out of the building alone.

Three versions of the video were released; the 'Album Version' for country music video channels, the 'Mutt Lange Remix' for Australia and the 'Dance Remix' for Canadian pop channels. The 'Album Version' video is available on Twain's DVD The Platinum Collection, while the 'Mutt Lange Mix' video is available on iTunes, VEVO and YouTube. The video won the Video of the Year Award at the 1996 Canadian Country Music Awards.

== Live performances ==
During Twain's Come On Over Tour and Up! Tour, the song was performed as the last main song of the setlist before returning to the stage for her encores. Each of the cities Twain visited on both tours, she would invite a local school marching band drum line to join her on stage. Twain would also play the drums along as well on stage. At the end of the song on the Come On Over Tour, Twain leads the drummers into a drum roll, which leads into a grand finale, including Twain standing on top of a big drum, while an electric lap steel guitar solo plays, before disappearing into it as fireworks and confetti erupt from the stage. On the Up! Tour, she again leads the drummers in joining in a big drum roll which lets off the fireworks with Twain disappearing after the song ends. The song has also been performed during her Vegas residency and her Rock This Country tour as the last song before the encore.

Besides, Twain also performed the song live during the 8th edition of the then-prestigious World Music Awards, in 1996. Immediately after her performance, she was honoured with the "World's Best-Selling Female Country Artist" award. Iconic singers, recording artists and performers Michael Jackson, Céline Dion and Seal were some of the audience members present at the venue. Each of them also performed live on that occasion.

== Track listings ==
- US 7-inch single

A. "(If You're Not in It for Love) I'm Outta Here!" – 4:30
B. "The Woman in Me (Needs the Man in You)" – 4:50

- US cassette single

A. "(If You're Not in It for Love) I'm Outta Here!" (remix) – 4:21
B. "If It Don't Take Two" – 3:40

- Australian CD single
1. "(If You're Not in It for Love) I'm Outta Here!" (Mutt Lange mix) – 4:21
2. "(If You're Not in It for Love) I'm Outta Here!" (dance mix) – 4:40
3. "No One Needs to Know" – 3:04
- Australian remixes CD and cassette single
1. "(If You're Not in It for Love) I'm Outta Here!" (Mutt Lange mix) – 4:21
2. "God Bless the Child" (extended version) – 3:48
3. "(If You're Not in It for Love) I'm Outta Here!" (dance mix) – 4:40
4. "(If You're Not in It for Love) I'm Outta Here!" (album version) – 4:30
5. "No One Needs to Know" – 3:04

== Personnel ==
Personnel are lifted from The Woman in Me liner notes.

- Larry Byrom – acoustic guitar
- Billy Crain – slide guitar
- Paul Franklin – pedal steel guitar, pedal-bro
- Rob Hajacos – fiddle
- Dan Huff – electric guitar
- David Hungate – bass guitar
- Nick Keka – handclaps
- Mutt Lange – handclaps
- Paul Leim – drums, door slam
- Terry McMillan – harmonica, cowbell
- Matt Rollings – piano
- Brent Rowan – electric guitar
- Shania Twain – lead and harmony vocals, handclaps, footsteps

== Charts ==
=== Weekly charts ===
Weekly chart performance for "(If You're Not in It for Love) I'm Outta Here!"
| Chart (1996–1997) | Peak position |
|---|---|
| Australia (ARIA) | 5 |
| Canada Adult Contemporary (RPM) | 49 |
| Canada Country Singles (RPM) | 1 |
| US Billboard Hot 100 | 74 |
| US Hot Country Songs (Billboard) | 1 |
| US Top Country Singles Sales (Billboard) with "The Woman in Me (Needs the Man in You)" | 1 |
| US Top Country Singles Sales (Billboard) Mutt Lange mix | 15 |

=== Year-end charts ===
Year-end chart performance for "(If You're Not in It for Love) I'm Outta Here!"
| Chart (1996) | Position |
|---|---|
| Australia (ARIA) | 87 |
| Canada Country Tracks (RPM) | 2 |
| US Hot Country Singles & Tracks (Billboard) | 12 |

== Certifications ==
Certifications for "(If You're Not in It for Love) I'm Outta Here!"
| Region | Certification | Certified units/sales |
|---|---|---|
| Australia (ARIA) | Platinum | 70,000^{^} |
^{^} Shipments figures based on certification alone.

== Real McCoy version ==
"(If You're Not in It for Love) I'm Outta Here!"

Single by Real McCoy

from the album One More Time
- B-side: "Party"
- Released: August 12, 1997
- Length: 4:10 (single edit)
- Label: Arista; BMG
- Songwriters: Robert John "Mutt" Lange; Shania Twain
- Producer: The Bermann Brothers

Real McCoy singles chronology
| "I Wanna Come" (1997) | "(If You're Not in It for Love) I'm Outta Here!" (1997) | "Pump Up the Jam '98" (1998) |

In 1997, German Eurodance Real McCoy released "(If You're Not in It for Love) I'm Outta Here!" as the third and final single from their fourth studio album One More Time (1997). Member O-Jay said the track was a controversial song for the group to record and weren't sure how it would be received. In the US, it was serviced to contemporary hit and rhythmic radio on August 12, 1997, and it was released commercially on September 16, 1997.

=== Critical reception ===
Larry Flick of Billboard gave the cover a positive review.

=== Track listing ===
CD single

1. "(If You're Not in It for Love) I'm Outta Here" (radio mix) – 4:10
2. "(If You're Not in It for Love) I'm Outta Here" (album version) – 3:58
3. "Party" – 3:57

CD maxi single

1. "(If You're Not in It for Love) I'm Outta Here" (extended radio mix) – 6:51
2. "(If You're Not in It for Love) I'm Outta Here" (Forthright club mix) – 7:51
3. "(If You're Not in It for Love) I'm Outta Here" (That Kid Chris Outta Here mix) – 10:55
4. "I Wanna Come (With You)" (Soul Solution dub) – 8:34

=== Weekly charts ===
1997 chart performance for "(If You're Not in It for Love) I'm Outta Here!" (Real McCoy version)
| Chart (1997) | Peak position |
|---|---|
| US Bubbling Under Hot 100 (Billboard) | 2 |
| US Maxi-Singles Sales (Billboard) | 22 |
