= Whose Bed Have Your Boots Been Under? =

- US & Canadian promo cover

Single by Shania Twain

from the album The Woman in Me
- A-side: "Any Man of Mine"
- Released: January 2, 1995
- Recorded: 1994
- Studio: A.R.P. Track Productions (Sainte-Anne-des-Lacs, Quebec, Canada); Sound Stage Recording Studios (Nashville, TN)
- Genre: Country pop
- Length: 3:59
- Label: Polygram; Mercury Nashville
- Songwriters: Robert John "Mutt" Lange; Shania Twain
- Producer: Robert John "Mutt" Lange

Shania Twain singles chronology
"You Lay a Whole Lot of Love on Me" (1993)	"Whose Bed Have Your Boots Been Under?" (1995)	"Any Man of Mine" (1995)

Music video
- "Whose Bed Have Your Boots Been Under?" on YouTube

"Whose Bed Have Your Boots Been Under?" is a song by Canadian country music singer Shania Twain. The song was written by Twain and her then husband Robert John "Mutt" Lange, who also produced the single; it was the first single released under what would be a decade-long collaboration between the two. Mercury Nashville released the song on January 2, 1995 to country radio as the lead single from her second studio album, The Woman in Me (1995).

Following the commercial failure of her self-titled debut album (1993), Twain had nearly been dropped from her label. After seeing the video for "What Made You Say That" on CMT Europe, Mutt Lange, who had been wanting to move in a country direction after producing massively successful rock albums for artists like AC/DC and Def Leppard, came into contact with her and the two began talking hours on the phone, with Twain singing him original songs and Lange offering to produce her album. They later met six months later in June 1993 at the CMA Music Festival and by December of that year, the two had gotten married.

"Whose Bed Have Your Boots Been Under?" is a song lyrically about a woman confronting her partner cheating on her, asking who he has been with. The song itself received highly positive reviews and has retrospectively been reviewed as one of Twain's best songs. The song was Twain's first top forty hit on the country charts. After noticing high amounts of the album selling, radio stations began playing the song into heavy rotation. The song rose as high as number eleven on the US Billboard Hot Country Songs chart (then known as "Hot Country Singles & Tracks) and became a number one country hit in Canada; the song became Twain's first entry on the Billboard Hot 100 when it was released as a double a-side single with her later single "Any Man of Mine" in June 1995, reaching number 31. By August 1995, the single was certified Gold for 500,000 copies, making it Twain's first single to be certified by the RIAA. The song later won the SOCAN Song of the Year award at the Canadian Country Music Awards in 1995.

== Music video ==
The music video for "Whose Bed Have Your Boots Been Under?" was shot in Santa Ynez, California and directed by American actor, filmmaker and photographer John Derek. It was filmed on December 19, 20 and 21, 1994 and released on January 2, 1995, on CMT. The video features Twain wearing a red dress, walking around in a smoky restaurant in the country. She interacts with various men in the restaurant, but she is invisible to them. These scenes are intercut with shots of her singing and playing guitar outside the restaurant. The video is available on Twain's DVD The Platinum Collection.

== Critical reception ==
Billboard magazine praised Twain's "velvety vocals" and the "neat production twists" on the song. Music & Media wrote, "Ways to be jealous get new elan from lyrics only cowgirls can sing with so much rivalry in their voice. Dance remixer Brian Tankersly puts the forceful kick into the boots." The magazine also named it "the most hilarious title of the year".

== Chart performance ==
"Whose Bed Have Your Boots Been Under?" debuted on the US Billboard Hot Country Singles & Tracks chart the week of January 14, 1995 at number 71. It spent 20 weeks on the chart and climbed to a peak position of number 11 on April 29, 1995, where it remained for two weeks. At the time, it was Twain's biggest single. The song ranked No. 40 on CMT's 40 Greatest Done-Me-Wrong Songs in 2004. It peaked at number 31 on the Billboard Hot 100 with her next single "Any Man of Mine".

== Official versions ==
- Album Version (4:25)
- Radio Edit (3:59)
- Dance Mix (4:50)
- Live from Still the One: Live from Vegas (4:46)

=== Track listing ===
Released as "Whose Bed Have Your Boots Been Under?" / "Any Man of Mine"

- US Cassette single (Mercury 856-448-4)
1. Side 1: "Whose Bed Have Your Boots Been Under?" (Edit)
2. Side 2: "Any Man of Mine"
- US CD single (Limited Edition) (Mercury 856 449–2)
1. "Whose Bed Have Your Boots Been Under?" (Edit)
2. "Any Man of Mine"
3. "Whose Bed Have Your Boots Been Under?" (Dance Mix)

== Charts ==
=== Weekly charts ===
Weekly chart performance of "Whose Bed Have Your Boots Been Under?"
Chart (1995)	Peak position
Canada Country Singles (RPM)	1
US Billboard Hot 100	31
US Hot Country Songs (Billboard)	11
US Top Country Singles Sales (Billboard) with "Any Man of Mine"	1

=== Year-end charts ===
Year-end chart performance of "Whose Bed Have Your Boots Been Under?"
Chart (1995)	Position
Canada Country Tracks (RPM)	11

== Certifications ==
Region	Certification	Certified units/sales
United States (RIAA)	Gold	500,000^{^}
^{^} Shipments figures based on certification alone.
