= Shania Twain discography =

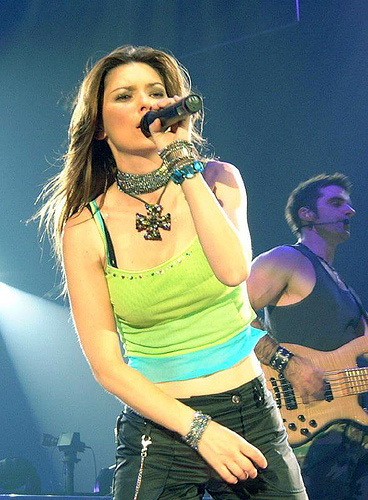
- Twain performing at Wembley Stadium in 2004
- Studio albums: 7
- Live albums: 2
- Compilation albums: 3
- Singles: 45
- Music videos: 40
- Remix albums: 3
- Box sets: 1
- Promotional singles: 9
- Other appearances: 9

Canadian singer and songwriter Shania Twain has released seven studio albums, three compilation albums, three remix albums, one box set, two live albums, 45 singles, 40 music videos, six promotional singles, and made six guest appearances. Twain's repertoire has sold over 34 million albums in the United States alone, placing her as the top-selling female artist in country music. Moreover, with 48 million copies shipped, she is ranked as the 26th best-selling artist overall in the US, tying with Kenny G for the spot. She is also recognized as one of the best-selling music artists in history, selling over 100 million records worldwide and thus becoming the top-selling female artist in country music ever.

In 1992, Twain signed to Mercury Records Nashville in the United States and released her debut studio album, Shania Twain, the following year. The project underperformed, peaking at number 67 on Billboard's Top Country Albums chart, and produced three singles, which also underperformed. After Twain's subsequent success, both the album and its singles gained the attention of her fan base, with the album receiving in 1999 a Platinum certification by the RIAA denoting sales of one million copies, as well as "What Made You Say That" and "Dance with the One That Brought You" both accumulating over 20 million streams each across platforms. Despite its initial failure, the album managed to attract the interest of renowned record producer Robert John "Mutt" Lange, responsible for blockbuster rock and roll albums by AC/DC and Def Leppard. He and Twain eventually got married, and collaborated on her second release, The Woman in Me, which was released in 1995. The Woman in Me led Twain to great commercial success. It topped Top Country Albums and peaked at number five on the main-genre, Billboard 200, earning a 12 times platinum certification by the RIAA, her first of three Diamond certified albums in the United States. Furthermore, The Woman in Me led to success in the singer's native country, Canada, where it was certified double diamond by Music Canada. The album was once the best-selling album by a female country singer; Twain later surpassed herself. The album spawned eight singles, four of which ("Any Man of Mine", "(If You're Not in It for Love) I'm Outta Here!", "You Win My Love", and "No One Needs to Know") topped the US Hot Country Singles & Tracks, with the first being certified double platinum by the RIAA as of 2022.

In 1997, Twain followed with Come On Over, which topped Top Country Albums for a record 50 non-consecutive weeks and had tremendous pop crossover success. It peaked at number two on the Billboard 200 and remained in the top 10 for a total of 53 weeks, making it the longest-running top 10 album by a country artist at the time. Certified 20 times platinum (double diamond) by the RIAA and with 15.5 million copies sold, Come On Over established itself as one of the best-selling albums of all time in the US and was once the best-selling album of the Nielsen SoundScan era; it now ranks second behind Metallica's 1991 eponymous album. In Canada, it reached similar success and was certified double diamond by Music Canada. In 1998, Come On Over was released internationally, duplicating the commercial success it encountered in North America. It became one of the best-selling albums in several countries, including Australia and the United Kingdom. With a total of 40 million copies sold worldwide, Come On Over also became one of the best-selling albums worldwide. Furthermore, the album is the best-selling solo album by a female artist in any genre (second female overall) and the best-selling country album of all time. A total of 12 singles were released from the album. Three ("Love Gets Me Every Time", "You're Still the One" and "Honey, I'm Home") topped Hot Country Singles & Tracks. A total of 10 songs charted within the top 10 of the chart, marking the most top 10 appearances from one album on Hot Country Singles & Tracks. Several performed well internationally, namely "You're Still the One", which went to became one of the greatest Billboard Hot 100 hits of all time, "From This Moment On", "That Don't Impress Me Much", "Man! I Feel Like a Woman!", and "Love Gets Me Every Time", all of which received gold, platinum, or higher certifications by the RIAA. In 1998, Twain was Billboard's top female artist in the United States.

In 2002, five years following the original release of Come On Over, came the release of the double album Up!. The release became Twain's first number-one album in the US, debuting with over 874,000 copies in its first week and marking at the time the largest opening sales for a female country album, a feat later surpassed by Taylor Swift in 2010. Up! remained atop the Billboard 200 for five consecutive weeks. It sold over 5.4 million copies, yet was certified 11 times platinum (diamond) by the RIAA for being a multi-disc release with over 100 minutes in length (see RIAA certification). Nevertheless, as Twain's third diamond album, it made her the only artist to have three consecutive diamond RIAA certified albums. Like her two previous albums, Up! was also certified double diamond in Canada. It produced eight singles, led by "I'm Gonna Getcha Good!", song that became the singer's first number-one in Canada. The title track, "Ka-Ching!", "She's Not Just A Pretty Face" and "Forever And For Always" also became notable hits across the world, with the third having earned a Grammy Award nomination, and the latter becoming her fourth highest performing single in the United States, certified platinum by the RIAA. In 2004, Twain released a Greatest Hits package that was certified quadruple platinum by the RIAA and spawned three new singles, including the US platinum-certified "Party for Two", breaking at the time the Guinness World Records record for the fastest-selling greatest hits album by a female artist in the US. Concluding a six-year hiatus, Twain released the single "Today Is Your Day" in 2011, which peaked within the top 70 on the Billboard Hot 100, and the Lionel Richie duet "Endless Love" in 2012, which became a moderate hit on Adult Contemporary radio and went number one on the Airplay chart. She also appeared on Michael Bublé's album Christmas, on a new version of "White Christmas", which is among Twain's most-streamed songs; as of 2026, it has accumulated over 260 million streams on Spotify and has previously peaked at number 13 on the Billboard Holiday 100 chart. Fifteen years after Up!, on September 29, 2017, Twain released her long awaited fifth studio album, Now. The album debuted at number one on the Billboard 200, becoming her second album to top the chart, and generated two singles, "Life's About to Get Good" and "Swingin' With My Eyes Closed". Supporting a 2022 Netflix original documentary of same name, she released Not Just a Girl (The Highlights), her second greatest hits album. In 2023, she released Queen of Me, her sixth studio album, which peaked at number 10 on the Billboard 200 and reached number one in the United Kingdom, pushed by the singles "Waking Up Dreaming" and "Giddy Up!". Still in 2023, Twain was featured on Anne-Marie's "Unhealthy", which became a hit in Europe, reaching number one in Slovakia and number 18 on the UK Singles Chart, also earning her highest streaming numbers in years.

== Albums ==
=== Studio albums ===
List of studio albums, with selected chart positions and certifications
Title	Album details	Peak chart positions										Certifications
Title	Album details	CAN	AUS	GER	IRL	NLD	NOR	NZ	UK	US	US Country	Certifications
Shania Twain	Released: April 20, 1993; Label: Mercury Nashville; Format: CD, cassette, LP, digital download	—	—	—	—	—	40	—	113	—	67	MC: 2× Platinum; BPI: Silver; RIAA: Platinum
The Woman in Me	Released: February 7, 1995; Label: Mercury Nashville; Format: CD, cassette, LP, digital download	6	17	72	60	46	5	38	7	5	1	MC: 2× Diamond; ARIA: 3× Platinum; BPI: Platinum; RIAA: 12× Platinum
Come On Over	Released: November 4, 1997; Label: Mercury Nashville; Format: CD, cassette, LP, digital download	1	1	8	1	1	1	1	1	2	1	MC: 2× Diamond; ARIA: 25× Platinum; BPI: 12× Platinum; BVMI: 3× Gold; IFPI NOR: 6× Platinum; NVPI: 5× Platinum; RIAA: 2× Diamond; RMNZ: 21× Platinum
Up!	Released: November 19, 2002; Label: Mercury Nashville; Format: DVD-A, CD, cassette, LP, digital download	1	1	1	3	8	2	1	4	1	1	MC: 2× Diamond; ARIA: 2× Platinum; BPI: 2× Platinum; BVMI: 2× Platinum; IFPI NOR: 3× Platinum; NVPI: Gold; RMNZ: 2× Platinum; RIAA: 11× Platinum
Now	Released: September 29, 2017; Label: Mercury Nashville; Format: CD, LP, digital download	1	1	12	4	22	21	3	1	1	1	MC: Platinum; BPI: Silver
Queen of Me	Released: February 3, 2023; Label: Republic; Format: CD, LP, digital download	2	5	13	15	53	—	—	1	10	2	
Little Miss Twain	Released: July 24, 2026; Label: Republic; Format: CD, LP, digital download	20	30	19	—	73	—	—	7	131	26	
"—" denotes releases that did not chart or were not released.

=== Compilation albums ===
List of compilation albums, with selected chart positions and certifications
Title	Album details	Peak chart positions										Certifications
Title	Album details	CAN	AUS	GER	IRL	NLD	NOR	NZ	UK	US	US Country	Certifications
The Complete Limelight Sessions	Released: October 23, 2001; Label: Limelight; Format: CD	93	—	—	—	65	—	—	62	—	43	BPI: Silver
Greatest Hits	Released: November 8, 2004; Label: Mercury Nashville; Formats: CD, cassette, digital download	1	10	3	6	14	14	10	6	2	1	MC: Diamond; ARIA: 3× Platinum; BPI: 3× Platinum; IRMA: 3× Platinum; RIAA: 4× Platinum; RMNZ: Platinum
Not Just a Girl (The Highlights)	Released: July 26, 2022; Label: Mercury Nashville / UMe; Format: CD, digital download	49	—	—	—	—	—	34	48	131	15	MC: 3× Platinum; BPI: Silver; RMNZ: Platinum
Love Songs	Released: February 9, 2024; Label: UMG; Format: digital download	—	—	—	—	—	—	—	—	—	—	PMB: Platinum
"—" denotes releases that did not chart or were not released.

=== Live albums ===
List of live albums, with selected chart positions and certifications
Title	Album details	Peak chart positions							Certifications
Title	Album details	CAN	AUS	NLD	NOR	NZ	US	US Country	Certifications
VH1 Divas Live	Released: October 5, 1998; Label: Epic; Formats: CD, VHS, DVD, cassette	12	12	7	9	10	21	—	ARIA: Platinum; RIAA: Gold; RMNZ: Platinum
Still the One: Live from Vegas	Released: March 3, 2015; Label: Mercury Nashville; Formats: CD, CD/DVD, digital download, BD	8	78	—	—	—	55	2	
"—" denotes releases that did not chart or were not released.

== Singles ==
=== As lead artist ===
List of singles, with selected chart positions and certifications
Title	Year	Peak chart positions										Certifications	Album
Title	Year	CAN	CAN Country	AUS	GER	IRL	NLD	NZ	UK	US	US Country	Certifications	Album
"What Made You Say That"	1993	—	70	—	—	—	—	—	—	—	55		Shania Twain
"Dance with the One That Brought You"	1993	—	77	—	—	—	—	—	—	—	55		Shania Twain
"You Lay a Whole Lot of Love on Me"	1993	—	—	—	—	—	—	—	—	—	—		Shania Twain
"Whose Bed Have Your Boots Been Under?"	1995	—	1	—	—	—	—	—	—	31	11	RIAA: Gold	The Woman in Me
"Any Man of Mine"	1995	—	1	—	—	—	—	—	118	31	1	MC: 5× Platinum; BPI: Silver; RIAA: 2× Platinum; RMNZ: Platinum	The Woman in Me
"The Woman in Me (Needs the Man in You)"	1995	—	1	—	—	—	—	—	—	74	14		The Woman in Me
"(If You're Not in It for Love) I'm Outta Here!"	1995	—	1	5	—	—	—	—	—	74	1	ARIA: Platinum	The Woman in Me
"You Win My Love"	1996	—	1	67	—	—	—	—	—	— (Note: "You Win My Love" did not enter the Billboard Hot 100, but peaked at number 8 on the Bubbling Under Hot 100 Singles chart.)	1		The Woman in Me
"No One Needs to Know"	1996	—	1	—	—	—	—	—	—	—	1		The Woman in Me
"Home Ain't Where His Heart Is (Anymore)"	1996	—	7	—	—	—	—	—	—	—	28		The Woman in Me
"God Bless the Child"	1996	1	7	—	—	—	—	—	—	75	48		The Woman in Me
"Love Gets Me Every Time"	1997	4	1	—	—	—	—	—	—	25	1	RIAA: Gold	Come On Over
"Don't Be Stupid (You Know I Love You)"	1997	12	1	32	—	15	19	42	5	40	6	BPI: Silver	Come On Over
"You're Still the One"	1998	7	1	1	68	3	10	9	10	2	1	MC: 4× Platinum; ARIA: Platinum; BPI: 2× Platinum; RIAA: 2× Platinum; RMNZ: 3× Platinum	Come On Over
"From This Moment On" (solo or with Bryan White) (Note: The version released to country music formats was a duet with Bryan White; all other formats received a version with only Twain.)	1998	13	1	2	—	—	53	7	9	4	6	MC: 2× Platinum; ARIA: 2× Platinum; BPI: Gold; RMNZ: Platinum; RIAA: Platinum	Come On Over
"When"	1998	14	—	—	—	—	—	—	18	—	—		Come On Over
"Honey, I'm Home"	1998	—	1	—	—	—	—	—	—	—	1	RIAA: Gold; RMNZ: Gold	Come On Over
"That Don't Impress Me Much"	1998	5	2	2	8	1	2	1	3	7	8	MC: 3× Platinum; ARIA: 2× Platinum; BPI: 2× Platinum; BVMI: Gold; IFPI NOR: Gold; RMNZ: 2× Platinum; RIAA: Platinum	Come On Over
"Man! I Feel Like a Woman!"	1999	18	2	4	33	8	10	1	3	23	4	MC: 6× Platinum; ARIA: Platinum; BPI: 2× Platinum; RIAA: 3× Platinum; RMNZ: 4× Platinum	Come On Over
"You've Got a Way"	1999	17	1	28	—	—	—	17	—	49	13		Come On Over
"Come On Over"	1999	—	1	—	—	—	—	—	—	58	6		Come On Over
"Rock This Country!"	2000	—	3	—	—	—	—	—	—	—	30		Come On Over
"I'm Holdin' On to Love (To Save My Life)"	2000	—	4	—	—	—	—	—	—	— (Note: "I'm Holdin' On to Love (To Save My Life)" did not enter the Billboard Hot 100, but peaked at number 2 on the Bubbling Under Hot 100 Singles chart.)	17		Come On Over
"I'm Gonna Getcha Good!"	2002	1	3	14	15	7	15	4	4	34	7	RIAA: Gold; BPI: Silver; ARIA: Gold; RMNZ: Gold	Up!
"Up!"	2003	2	2	29	42	—	—	27	21	63	12	RIAA: Gold	Up!
"Ka-Ching!"	2003	—	—	—	3	27	11	—	8	—	—	BVMI: Gold	Up!
"Forever and for Always"	2003	5	*	45	9	6	44	17	6	20	4	RIAA: Platinum; RMNZ: Gold	Up!
"Thank You Baby! (For Makin' Someday Come So Soon)"	2003	—	—	—	20	23	48	—	11	—	—		Up!
"She's Not Just a Pretty Face"	2003	—	*	—	—	—	—	—	—	56	9		Up!
"When You Kiss Me"	2003	—	—	47	30	41	—	—	21	—	60		Up!
"It Only Hurts When I'm Breathing"	2004	4	4	—	—	—	—	—	—	71	18		Up!
"Party for Two" (with Billy Currington or Mark McGrath)	2004	2	3	—	7	25	44	—	10	58	7	RIAA: Platinum	Greatest Hits
"Don't!"	2005	10	4	—	58	48	—	—	30	— (Note: "Don't!" did not enter the Billboard Hot 100, but peaked at number 22 on the Bubbling Under Hot 100 Singles chart.)	24		Greatest Hits
"I Ain't No Quitter"	2005	—	8	—	—	—	—	—	—	—	45		Greatest Hits
"Shoes"	2005	—	—	—	—	—	—	—	—	—	29		Desperate Housewives
"Today Is Your Day"	2011	14	18	—	—	—	—	—	—	66	36		Non-album single
"Endless Love" (Lionel Richie featuring Shania Twain)	2012	—	—	—	—	—	—	—	—	— (Note: "Endless Love" did not enter the Billboard Hot 100, but peaked at number 16 on the Bubbling Under Hot 100 Singles chart.)	— (Note: "Endless Love" did not enter Hot Country Songs, but peaked at number 41 on the Country Digital Song Sales chart.)		Tuskegee
"Life's About to Get Good"	2017	70	26	—	—	—	—	—	— (Note: "Life's About to Get Good" did not enter the UK Singles Chart, but peaked at number 64 on the UK Downloads component chart.)	—	33	MC: Gold	Now
"Swingin' with My Eyes Closed"	2017	—	—	—	—	—	—	—	— (Note: "Swingin' with My Eyes Closed" did not enter the UK Singles Chart, but peaked at number 91 on the UK Downloads component chart.)	—	—		Now
"We Got Something They Don't"	2017	—	—	—	—	—	—	—	—	—	— (Note: "We Got Something They Don't" did not enter Hot Country Songs, but peaked at number 47 on the Country Airplay chart.)		Now
"Who's Gonna Be Your Girl"	2017	—	—	—	—	—	—	—	—	—	—		Now
"Hole in the Bottle" (with Kelsea Ballerini)	2020	—	—	—	—	—	—	—	—	—	—		Non-album single
"Forever and Ever, Amen" (with Ronan Keating)	2021	—	—	—	—	—	—	—	—	—	—		Twenty Twenty
"Waking Up Dreaming"	2022	72	—	—	—	—	—	—	—	—	— (Note: "Waking Up Dreaming" did not enter Hot Country Songs, but peaked at number 10 on the Country Digital Song Sales chart.)		Queen of Me
"Giddy Up!"	2023	70	43	—	—	—	—	— (Note: "Giddy Up!" did not enter the NZ Top 40 Singles Chart, but peaked at number 17 on the NZ Hot Singles Chart.)	—	—	— (Note: "Giddy Up!" did not enter Hot Country Songs, but peaked at number 13 on the Country Digital Song Sales chart.)		Queen of Me
"White Claw" (with Yung Gravy)	2024	—	—	—	—	—	—	—	—	—	—		Serving Country
"Da Stanotte in Poi (From This Moment On)" (with Andrea Bocelli)	2024	—	—	—	—	—	—	—	—	—	—		Duets (30th Anniversary)
"Dirty Rosie"	2026	—	57	—	—	—	—	—	—	—	—		Little Miss Twain
"—" denotes items which were not released in that country or failed to chart. "*" denotes items which are unverifiable.

=== As featured artist ===
List of singles as featured artist
Title	Year	Peak chart positions							Certifications	Album
Title	Year	CAN	IRL	NLD	NZ Hot	UK	US Bub.	US Country	Certifications	Album
"Unhealthy" (Anne-Marie featuring Shania Twain)	2023	—	10	2	10	18	—	—	BPI: Platinum	Unhealthy
"Boots" (Kane Brown featuring Shania Twain)	2026	79	—	—	27	—	9	36		TBA

=== Promotional singles ===
List of promotional singles, with selected chart positions
Title	Year	Peak chart positions		Album
Title	Year	CAN Digital	US Dance	Album
"For the Love of Him"	1999	—	—	The Complete Limelight Sessions
"It's Alright"	2001	—	25	The Complete Limelight Sessions
"The Heart Is Blind"	2001	—	—	The Complete Limelight Sessions
"Poor Me"	2017	—	—	Now
"Not Just a Girl"	2022	32	—	Not Just a Girl (The Highlights)
"Last Day of Summer"	2022	—	—	Queen of Me
"Yes, I Will" (with The Stylistics)	2025	—	—	Falling in Love with My Girl
"Little Miss Twain" (with Tanya Tucker)	2026	—	—	Little Miss Twain
"Faded Blue Jeans" (with Josh Homme)	2026	—	—	Little Miss Twain
"—" denotes items which were not released in that country or failed to chart.

== Other charted songs ==
List of songs, with selected chart positions
Title	Year	Peak chart positions			Certifications	Album
Title	Year	CAN	CAN Country	US Country	Certifications	Album
"If It Don't Take Two"	1997	—	80	—		The Woman in Me
"Coat of Many Colors" (with Alison Krauss & Union Station)	2003	—	—	57		Just Because I'm a Woman: Songs of Dolly Parton
"White Christmas" (with Michael Bublé)	2011	86	—	—	BPI: Silver; RMNZ: Gold	Christmas
"Say All You Want for Christmas" (Nick Jonas featuring Shania Twain)	2017	— (Note: "Say All You Want for Christmas" did not enter the Canadian Hot 100, but peaked at number 16 on the Canada AC chart.)	—	—		Island: This Is Christmas
"—" denotes items which were not released in that country or failed to chart.

== Other appearances ==
List of songs, with selected details
Title	Year	Notes
"Amneris' Letter"	1999	Appeared in the concept album Elton John and Tim Rice's Aida, designed by Elton John and Tim Rice.
"Coat of Many Colors"	2003	Cover version of the 1971 song by Dolly Parton recorded with Alison Krauss for the tribute album to Parton Just Because I'm a Woman: Songs of Dolly Parton.
"Blue Eyes Crying in the Rain"	2003	Live duet with Willie Nelson for his live album Live and Kickin'.
"You Needed Me"	2007	Cover version of the 1978 song by Anne Murray recorded with Murray for her duets album Anne Murray Duets: Friends & Legends.
"White Christmas"	2011	Duet with Michael Bublé for his Christmas album Christmas.
"You're Still the One"	2014	Duet with Paula Fernandes for her album Encontros pelo Caminho.
"Say All You Want for Christmas"	2017	Duet with Nick Jonas for the EP This Is Christmas.
"Legends Never Die"	2020	Duet with Orville Peck for his EP Show Pony.
"Boots Don't"	2024	Duet with Breland from the soundtrack album Twisters: The Album.
