= Not Just a Girl (The Highlights) =

Compilation album by Shania Twain
- Released: July 26, 2022
- Recorded: 1992–2022
- Genre: Country; pop
- Length: 68:34
- Label: Mercury Nashville

Shania Twain chronology
Now (2017)	Not Just a Girl (The Highlights) (2022)	Queen of Me (2023)

Not Just a Girl (The Highlights) is a compilation album by Shania Twain. It was first released digitally on July 26, 2022, before receiving a physical CD release on September 2, 2022. The digital release coincides with the Netflix documentary spanning Twain's music career, Not Just a Girl. The album contains one new track, the title track, and 17 previously released singles from Twain's five studio albums. The title track was later included on her sixth studio album Queen of Me.

== Track listing ==
All tracks are written by Shania Twain and Robert John "Mutt" Lange, except where noted.

Not Just a Girl (The Highlights) track listing
No.	Title	Original album	Length
1.	"Not Just a Girl" (Twain, Mark Ralph, Wayne Hector)	Previously unreleased, later included on Queen of Me (2023)	3:11
2.	"You're Still the One"	Come On Over (1997)	3:33
3.	"Man! I Feel Like a Woman!"	Come On Over	3:55
4.	"What Made You Say That" (Tony Haselden, Stan Munsey, Jr.)	Shania Twain (1993)	2:59
5.	"(If You're Not in It for Love) I'm Outta Here!"	The Woman in Me (1995)	4:30
6.	"Whose Bed Have Your Boots Been Under?"	The Woman in Me	4:25
7.	"Any Man of Mine"	The Woman in Me	4:08
8.	"You Win My Love" (Lange)	The Woman in Me	4:27
9.	"Don't Be Stupid (You Know I Love You)"	Come On Over	3:36
10.	"I'm Holdin' On to Love (To Save My Life)"	Come On Over	3:30
11.	"From This Moment On"	Come On Over	4:42
12.	"Love Gets Me Every Time"	Come On Over	3:32
13.	"That Don't Impress Me Much"	Come On Over	3:40
14.	"Forever and for Always"	Up! (2002)	4:45
15.	"Honey, I'm Home"	Come On Over	3:38
16.	"I'm Gonna Getcha Good!"	Up!	4:30
17.	"Up!"	Up!	2:54
18.	"Life's About to Get Good" (Twain)	Now (2017)	3:39
Total length:			68:34

== Charts ==
=== Weekly charts ===
Weekly chart performance for Not Just a Girl (The Highlights)
Chart (2022)	Peak position
Australian Country Albums (ARIA)	8
Canadian Albums (Billboard)	49
New Zealand Albums (RMNZ)	34
UK Albums (Official Charts)	48

=== Year-end charts ===
Year-end chart performance for Not Just a Girl (The Highlights)
Chart (2022)	Position
Australian Country Albums (ARIA)	24
Chart (2023)	Position
Australian Country Albums (ARIA)	20
US Top Country Albums (Billboard)	59
Chart (2024)	Position
Australian Country Albums (ARIA)	25
Chart (2025)	Position
Australian Country Albums (ARIA)	33

== Certifications ==
Certifications for Not Just a Girl (The Highlights)
Region	Certification	Certified units/sales
Canada (Music Canada)	3× Platinum	240,000^{‡}
New Zealand (RMNZ)	Platinum	15,000^{‡}
United Kingdom (BPI)	Silver	60,000^{‡}
^{‡} Sales+streaming figures based on certification alone.

== Release history ==
Release history and formats for Not Just a Girl (The Highlights)
Region	Date	Format(s)	Label
Various	July 26, 2022	Digital download; streaming	Mercury Nashville
Various	September 2, 2022	CD	Mercury Nashville
