= Shania Twain =

Canadian singer and songwriter (born 1965)

Shania Twain OC
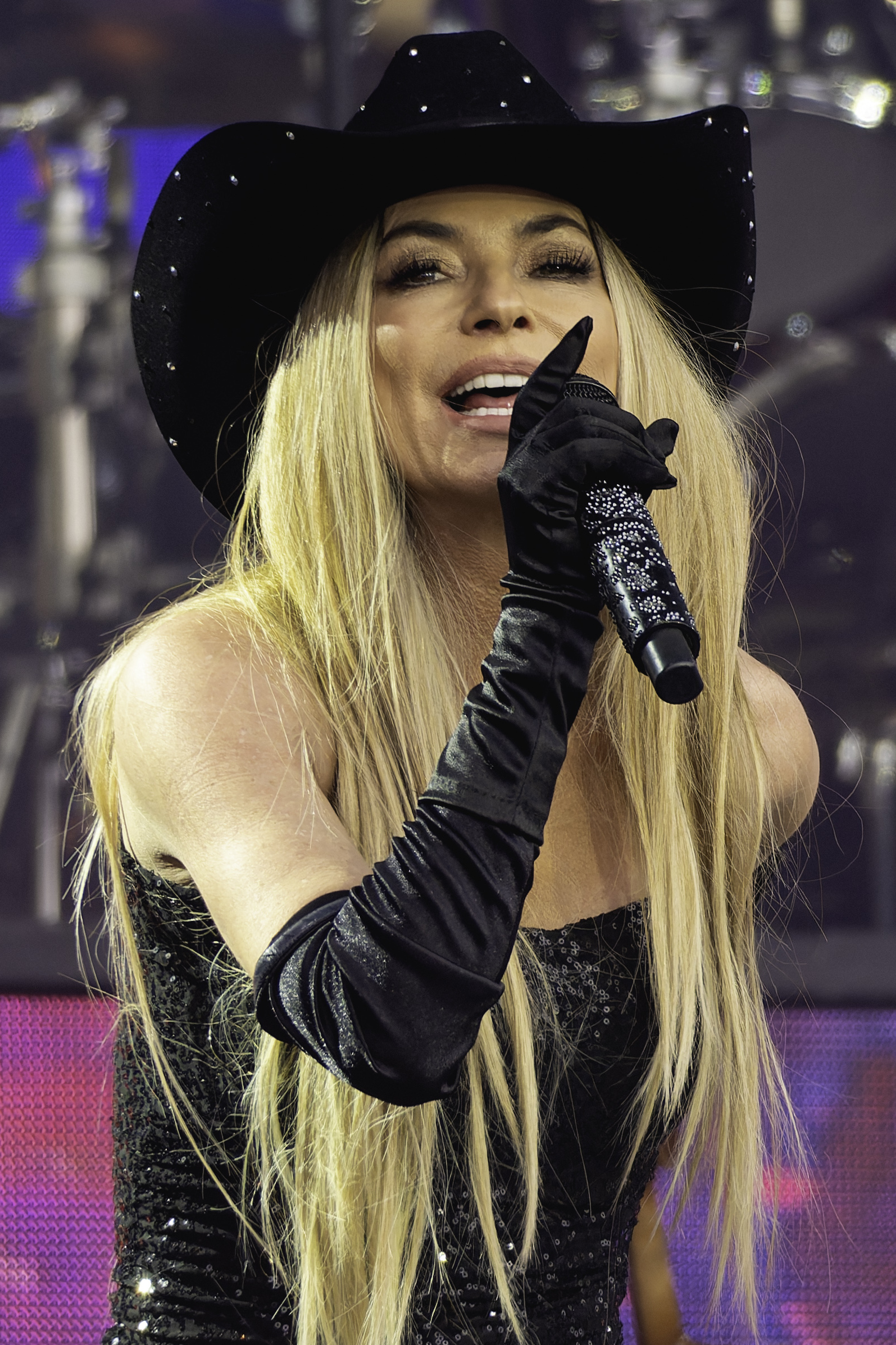
- Twain in 2024
- Born: Eilleen Regina Edwards; August 28, 1965 (age 61); Windsor, Ontario, Canada
- Other name: Eilleen Twain
- Occupations: Singer; songwriter
- Years active: 1983–present
- Spouses: Mutt Lange (m. 1993; div. 2010) Frédéric Thiébaud (m. 2011)
- Children: 1
- Relatives: Henk Wijngaard (half-uncle)
- Awards: Full list
- Musical career
- Origin: Timmins, Ontario, Canada
- Genres: Country; pop
- Instruments: Vocals; guitar
- Works: Discography; videography
- Labels: Mercury; Republic; EMI
- Website: shaniatwain.com

Eilleen Regina "Shania" Twain (/aɪˈliːn/ /ʃəˈnaɪə/ eye-LEEN ... shə-NY-ə) (née Edwards; born August 28, 1965) is a Canadian singer and songwriter. She has sold more than 100 million records, making her one of the best-selling music artists of all time and the best-selling female artist in country music history. She received several titles including the "Queen of Country Pop". Billboard named her as the leader of the 1990s country pop crossover stars.

Twain grew up in Timmins, Ontario, and from a young age she pursued singing and songwriting before signing with Mercury Nashville Records in the early 1990s. Her self-titled debut studio album was a commercial failure upon release in 1993. After collaborating with producer and husband-to-be Robert John "Mutt" Lange, she rose to fame with her second studio album, The Woman in Me (1995), which brought her widespread success. It sold more than 20 million copies worldwide, spawned eight singles, including "Any Man of Mine" and earned her a Grammy Award. Twain's third studio album, Come On Over (1997), has sold more than 40 million copies worldwide, making it the best-selling studio album by a female solo artist, the best-selling country album, best-selling album by a Canadian, and one of the best-selling albums of all time. Come On Over produced twelve singles, including "You're Still the One", "From This Moment On", "That Don't Impress Me Much" and "Man! I Feel Like a Woman!" and earned her four Grammy Awards. Her fourth studio album, Up! (2002), spawned eight singles, including "I'm Gonna Getcha Good!", "Ka-Ching!" and "Forever and for Always".

In 2004, after releasing her Greatest Hits album, which produced three singles including "Party for Two", Twain entered a hiatus, stating years later that diagnoses with Lyme disease and dysphonia severely weakened her singing voice. She chronicled her vocal rehabilitation on the OWN miniseries Why Not? with Shania Twain, released her first single in six years in 2011, "Today Is Your Day", and published an autobiography, From This Moment On. Twain returned to performing the following year with an exclusive concert residency at The Colosseum at Caesars Palace, Shania: Still the One, which ran until 2014. Twain released her first studio album in 15 years in 2017, Now it reached number one on the US Billboard 200 and several other charts. Her sixth studio album Queen of Me was released in 2023, and she became only the third woman to have top ten albums in the US Billboard 200 in the 1990s, 2000s, 2010s and 2020s. Twain's seventh studio album, Little Miss Twain, was released in 2026.

Twain has received five Grammy Awards, two World Music Awards, thirty-nine Broadcast Music, Inc. (BMI) Songwriter Awards, inductions to Canada's Walk of Fame and the Hollywood Walk of Fame, as well as the Canadian Music Hall of Fame and Nashville Songwriters Hall of Fame. According to the Recording Industry Association of America (RIAA), she is the only female artist in history to have three consecutive albums receive diamond certifications and is the seventh best-selling female artist in the United States. Altogether Twain is ranked as the 10th best-selling artist of the Nielsen SoundScan era. Billboard listed her as the 13th Greatest Music Video Female Solo Artist of all time (42nd overall). According to Billboard Boxscore, she is the highest-grossing female country touring artist with $421.1 million gross from her concert tours.

== Early life ==
Twain was born Eilleen Regina Edwards in Windsor, Ontario, on August 28, 1965, to Sharon (née Morrison) of Irish descent and railway engineer Clarence Edwards. She has two sisters, Jill and Carrie Ann. Her parents divorced when she was two, and her mother moved to Timmins, Ontario, with her daughters. Sharon married Jerry Twain, an Ojibwe from the nearby Mattagami First Nation, and they had a son, Mark. Jerry adopted the girls and legally changed their surname to Twain. When Mark was a toddler, Jerry and Sharon adopted Jerry's baby nephew Darryl when his mother died. Because of Twain's connection to Jerry, the media have incorrectly reported that she is of Ojibwe descent. Once Twain had begun to accumulate success and awards, her hometown's newspaper, the Timmins Daily Press, published several stories under sensationalistic headlines wherein relatives of her biological father sold personal details about her life to the newspaper, and made accusations of Twain seeking to use Native ancestry as a career-promoting ploy. The Ojibwe community in which she had been raised, however, stated the likely motive for these estranged relatives' stories to be mercenary hopes of benefit from Twain's success; her adoptive father's cousin "spoke on behalf of their family and voiced the feelings of their community" in saying, "we treated her as Native, raised her as Native. We accepted her as part of our family, no questions asked". Roger Ellis, then president of the First Americans in the Arts organisation, who had given Twain an award for Outstanding Musical Achievement, noted their award was given in "good faith" on the basis of Twain's Canadian reserve card, and concluded that "Ms. Twain has not intentionally misrepresented herself and that she has celebrated her Native American heritage without capitalizing at the expense of the Native American community". When questioned as to why she chose not to publicly acknowledge Edwards as her biological father for years, she said:

My father [Jerry Twain] went out of his way to raise three daughters that weren't even his. For me to acknowledge another man as my father, a man who was never there for me as a father, who wasn't the one who struggled every day to put food on our table, would have hurt him terribly. We were a family. Step-father, step-brothers, we never used that vocabulary in our home. To have referred to him as my step-father would have been the worst slap across the face to him.

She holds a status card and is on the official band membership list of the Temagami First Nation. In 1991, Twain was offered a recording contract in Nashville and applied for immigration status into the United States. At that time, by virtue of her adoptive father, Jerry Twain, being a full-blooded Ojibwe and the rights guaranteed to indigenous Americans in the Jay Treaty (1795), she became legally registered as having 50 percent indigenous American blood.

Her confirmed ancestry includes Irish and French roots. Through a maternal great-grandmother, she is a descendant of French carpenter Zacharie Cloutier. Her Irish maternal grandmother, Eileen Pearce, emigrated from Newbridge, County Kildare. Her father's half-brother is the Dutch country singer Henk Wijngaard, who has 20 top-40 hits in the Netherlands.

She has said she had a difficult childhood. Her parents earned little money, and food was often scarce in their household. She did not confide her situation to school authorities, fearing they might break up the family. Her adoptive father was abusive, and from a young age she witnessed his violence against her mother. Her mother struggled with bouts of depression. She eventually convinced her mother to take her and the children and run away to a homeless shelter in Toronto; however Sharon returned to Jerry with the children in 1981.

In Timmins, Shania started singing at bars at the age of eight to try to help pay her family's bills; she often earned CA$20 between midnight and 1 a.m. performing for remaining customers after the bar had finished serving alcohol. Although she expressed a dislike for singing in those bars, she believes that this was her own kind of performing-arts school on the road. She has said of the ordeal, "My deepest passion was music and it helped. There were moments when I thought, 'I hate this.' I hated going into bars and being with drunks. But I loved the music and so I survived." She said that the art of creating, of actually writing songs, "was very different from performing them and became progressively important".

At 13, Twain was invited to perform on the CBC's Tommy Hunter Show. While attending Timmins High and Vocational School, she was the singer for a local band called Longshot, which covered Top 40 music. In the early 1980s she worked with her father's reforestation business in northern Ontario, which employed about 75 Ojibwe and Cree workers. Although the work was demanding and the pay low, she said:

I loved the feeling of being stranded. I'm not afraid of being in my own environment, being physical, working hard. I was very strong, I walked miles and miles every day and carried heavy loads of trees. You can't shampoo, use soap or deodorant, or makeup, nothing with any scent; you have to bathe and rinse your clothes in the lake. It was a very rugged existence, but I was very creative and I would sit alone in the forest with my dog and a guitar and would just write songs.

== Career ==
=== 1983–1992: Beginnings ===
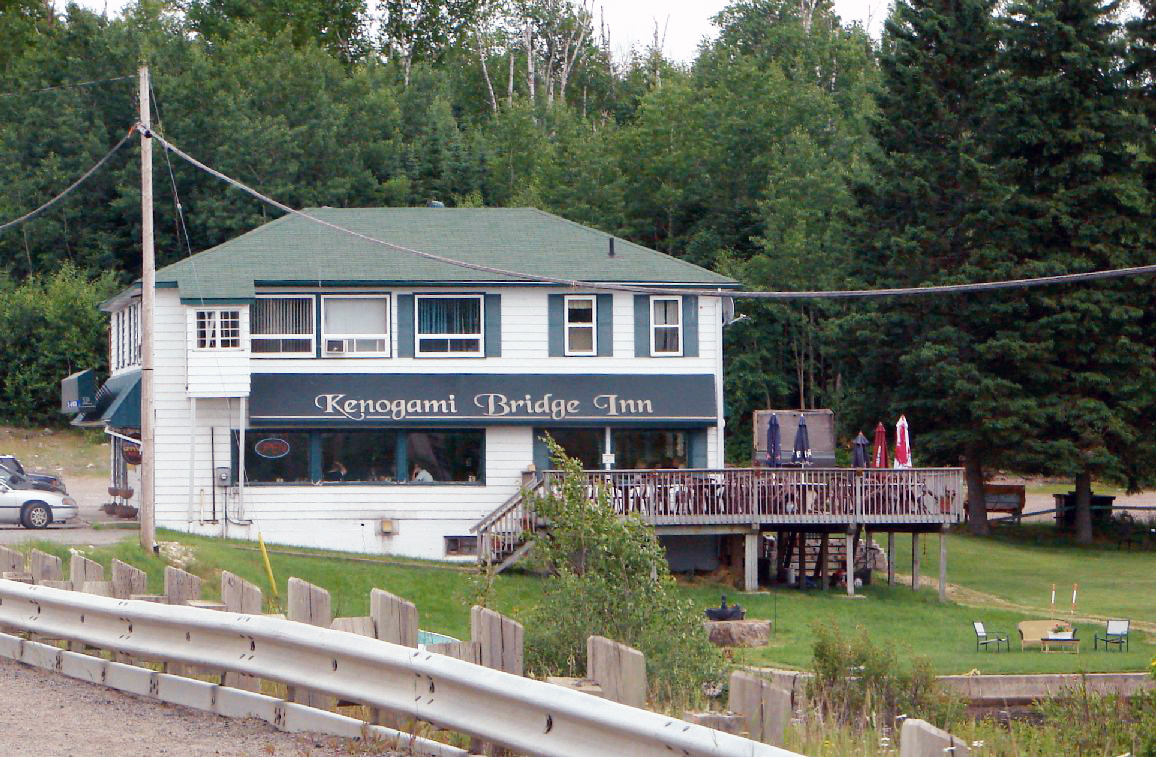
Kenogami Lake, Ontario, where Twain spent much time practising in 1985

Twain graduated from Timmins High in June 1983 eager to expand her musical horizons. After Longshot's demise she was approached by a cover band led by Diane Chase called Flirt and toured Ontario with them. She took singing lessons from Toronto-based coach Ian Garrett, often cleaning his house as payment. In the autumn of 1984 her talents were noticed by Toronto DJ Stan Campbell who wrote about her in a Country Music News article: "Eilleen possesses a powerful voice with an impressive range. She has the necessary drive, ambition and positive attitude to achieve her goals". Campbell was making an album by Canadian musician (and present-day CKTB radio personality) Tim Denis at the time and she was featured on the backing vocals of the song "Heavy on the Sunshine". Country singer Mary Bailey saw her perform in Sudbury, Ontario, saying "I saw this little girl up on stage with a guitar and it absolutely blew me away. She performed Willie Nelson's "Blue Eyes Crying in the Rain" and Hank Williams' "I'm So Lonesome I Could Cry". Her voice reminded me of Tanya Tucker, it had strength and character, a lot of feeling. She's a star, she deserves an opportunity." Bailey later said "She sang a few songs that she had written, and I thought to myself, this kid is like nineteen years old, where does she get this? This is from a person who's lived sixty years". On November 1, 1987, her mother and adoptive father died in a car accident approximately 50 kilometres (31 mi) north of Wawa, Ontario. She moved back to Timmins to take care of her younger siblings and took them all to Huntsville, Ontario, where she supported them by earning money performing at the nearby Deerhurst Resort.

=== 1993–1994: Shania Twain ===
Several years later, when Twain's siblings moved out on their own, she assembled a demo tape of her songs and her Huntsville manager set up a showcase for her to present her material to record executives. She caught the attention of a few labels, including Mercury Nashville Records, who signed her within a few months. During this time, she changed her name to Shania, which was rumoured to be an Ojibwe word which means "on my way". However, her biographer, Robin Eggar, writes: "There is a continuing confusion about what 'Shania' means and if indeed it is an Ojibwe word or phrase at all. There is no mispronounced or misheard phrase in either Ojibwe or Cree that comes close to meaning 'on my way.' Yet the legend of her name continues to be repeated in the media to this day." Cleveland Evans, in the Omaha World-Herald, claimed Eggar was mistaken about there being no Ojibwe phrase that "comes close", and suggested a translation of the Ojibwe words "Ani aya'aa", pronounced "Ah-nih Eye-uh-ah", to be "someone on the way"; he concluded that it is therefore possible that someone with an imperfect knowledge of the Ojibwe language created Shania with the incorrect idea it would mean "she's on the way".

Her self-titled debut album was released on April 20, 1993, in North America and garnered her audiences outside Canada. Shortly before its release, she sang backing vocals for other Mercury artists, including on Jeff Chance's album Walk Softly on the Bridges (1992) and Sammy Kershaw's album Haunted Heart (1993). Shania Twain reached No. 67 on the US Country Albums Chart and gained positive reviews from critics. The album failed to sell significant copies upon release, but her future success generated enough interest for the album to be certified platinum in 1999 by the Recording Industry Association of America (RIAA), denoting sales of over 1 million copies. The album yielded two minor hit singles in the United States with "What Made You Say That" and "Dance with the One That Brought You". The third and final single, "You Lay a Whole Lot of Love on Me", failed to chart. All three singles had accompanying music videos. The album was more successful in Europe, where she won Country Music Television Europe's "Rising Video Star of the Year" award. In her 2011 autobiography From This Moment On she expressed displeasure with her debut studio album, revealing that she had very little creative control and was frustrated with being unable to showcase her songwriting abilities. She did, however, co-write one song, "God Ain't Gonna Getcha for That", for the album.

=== 1995–1996: The Woman in Me and commercial success ===
When rock producer Robert John "Mutt" Lange heard Twain's original songs and singing from her debut album, he offered to produce and write songs with her. After many telephone conversations, they met at Nashville's Fan Fair in June 1993. Twain and Lange became very close within weeks, culminating in their wedding on December 28, 1993. They co-wrote every song apart from one that featured on her second studio album, The Woman in Me. The Woman in Me was released on February 7, 1995. Of the 12 tracks on the album, eight were released as singles. The album's first single, "Whose Bed Have Your Boots Been Under?" went to number 11 on the Billboard Country Chart. This was followed by her first Country Top 10 and number one single, "Any Man of Mine", which also cracked the Top 40 on the Billboard Hot 100. She had further hits from the album, including the title track which peaked at number 14 and three additional number ones: "(If You're Not in It for Love) I'm Outta Here!", "You Win My Love", and "No One Needs to Know", which was selected for the original soundtrack for the 1996 film Twister, a first for Twain. Plus minor country hit "Home Ain't Where His Heart Is (Anymore)" and a re-recorded gospel version of the album track "God Bless the Child" with new lyrics. Meanwhile, in Australia, five of these singles: "The Woman in Me", "I'm Outta Here!", "You Win My Love", "No One Needs to Know" and "God Bless the Child", were remixed for the Australian pop market, with "I'm Outta Here!" becoming her breakthrough hit there, reaching number 5 on the Australian charts.

As of 2007 the album had sold more than 12 million copies in the United States, being certified Diamond by the Recording Industry Association of America (RIAA). The album was a commercial success, leading to performances at selected international venues and television shows, including two CMA Fan Fair appearances with Nashville guitarists Randy Thomas and Daniel Joseph Schafer. Mercury Nashville's promotion of the album was based largely upon a series of music videos, which every single from the album had. During this period she made television appearances on shows such as two performances on the Late Show with David Letterman, Blockbuster Music Awards, Billboard Music Awards and the American Music Awards. The Woman in Me won the Grammy Award for Best Country Album as well as the Academy of Country Music award for Album of the Year; the latter group also awarded her Best New Female Vocalist.

=== 1997–2001: Come On Over, international breakthrough. ===
In 1997 Twain released her follow-up album, Come On Over. It established her as a successful crossover singer. Of the sixteen tracks on the album, twelve were released as singles. Following the release of lead singles "Love Gets Me Every Time" and "Don't Be Stupid (You Know I Love You)", which allowed her to make more appearances in the Billboard Hot 100, the album started selling. With the release of third single, "You're Still the One", sales skyrocketed. "From This Moment On", "When", "Honey, I'm Home", "That Don't Impress Me Much", "Man! I Feel Like a Woman!", "You've Got a Way", the title track, "Rock This Country!", and "I'm Holdin' On to Love (To Save My Life)" are the other nine songs that eventually saw release as singles. With the exception of "I'm Holdin' On to Love", all of the singles had accompanying music videos. "From This Moment On" is a duet with singer Bryan White and there was a re-recorded solo pop version, which was used for its music video.

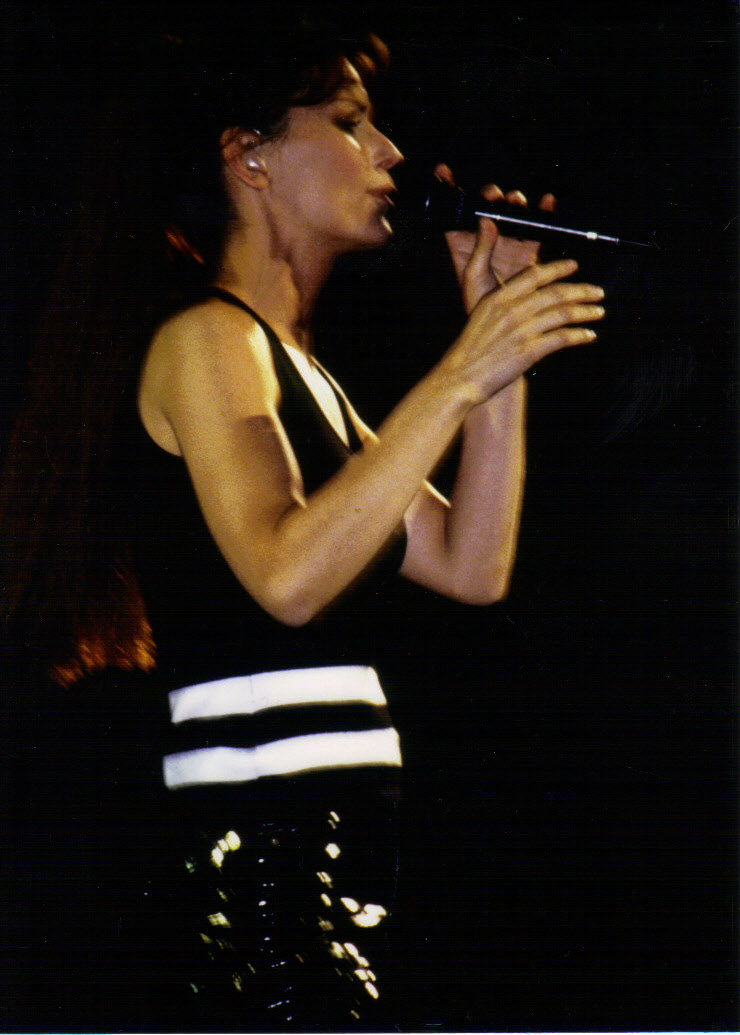
Twain performing at the FleetCenter in Boston on the Come On Over Tour, June 1999

The album peaked at No. 2 on the Billboard 200 and stayed on the charts for the next two years, going on to sell 40 million copies worldwide, making it the biggest-selling album of all time by a female musician. She continued to break international boundaries for country music and female crossover artists. It is also the ninth highest-selling album by any type of artist in the US and the top selling country album in history. Songs from the album won four Grammy Awards during this time, including Best Country Song and Best Female Country Performance (for "You're Still the One" and "Man! I Feel Like a Woman!") for her. Lange won Grammys for "You're Still the One" and "Come On Over".

In 1998 following the pop release of "You're Still the One", the Come On Over album was released in a remixed format for the European market as a pop album with less country instrumentation, and gave her the big breakthrough in Europe she and Lange were looking for. Come On Over went to No. 1 on the UK album charts for 11 weeks. It became the biggest selling album of the year in the UK and a bestseller in other big European markets as well, selling more than one million copies in Germany and nearly 4 million in the UK alone. Although "You're Still The One" and the pop version of "From This Moment On" cracked the Top 10 of the UK charts and "When" had success in the Top 20, the songs that drew European attention to the album were the pop remixed singles of "That Don't Impress Me Much", which reached number 3 in the UK and cracked the Top 10 in Germany, and "Man! I Feel Like a Woman!", which peaked at number 3 in both the UK and France. Additionally, "You've Got a Way" was remixed specifically for inclusion on the soundtrack for the film Notting Hill. Subsequently, a reissue of the international version of the album was released worldwide, including the US and Europe, containing three of these new remixes. Additionally, the album set the record for the longest ever stay in the Top 20 of the Billboard 200, remaining there for 99 weeks. Billboard magazine declared Shania Twain the most played adult contemporary artist on US radio in 1999.

In 1998, she launched her first major concert tour, aided by her manager Jon Landau, a veteran of many large-scale tours with Bruce Springsteen. The Come On Over Tour shows were a success, winning the "Country Tour of the Year" in 1998 and 1999 by Pollstar Concert Industry Awards. In 2000, she was initially scheduled to release a Christmas album, but plans to release one were cancelled later in the year. As of 2004, Come on Over has sold more than 20 million copies in the United States, being certified Double Diamond by the RIAA.

=== 2002–2004: Up! ===
After a change in management – QPrime replaced Landau – and a two-year break, along with the birth of their son, Eja (pronounced "Asia") D'Angelo, Twain and Lange returned to the studio. Up! was released on November 19, 2002. On January 26, 2003, she performed in the Super Bowl XXXVII halftime show. About a year later she kicked off the Up! Tour in Hamilton, Ontario, Canada on September 25, 2003. Up! was released with three different discs – country/acoustic (green CD), pop/rock (red CD), and world/dance (blue CD). Up! was given four out of five stars by Rolling Stone magazine, and debuted at No.1 on the Billboard albums chart, selling 874,000 in the first week alone. It remained at the top of the charts for five weeks. Her crossover appeal in the country, pop and dance genres, led Up! to reach 1 in Germany, 2 in Australia and the Top Five in the UK and France. In Germany, Up! was certified 4× platinum and stayed in the Top 100 for a year and a half. The international music disc was remixed with Indian-style orchestral and percussion parts recorded in Mumbai, India. The new versions were produced by Simon and Diamond Duggal, brothers from Birmingham, England. They were originally invited to contribute parts to the pop version of "I'm Gonna Getcha Good!" which retained the Indian influence.

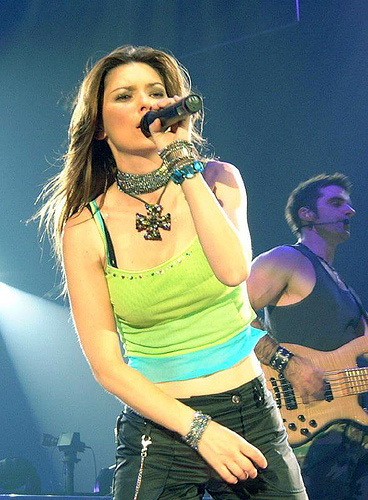
Shania Twain performing in Wembley Stadium during her Up! Tour in February 2004

Her popularity in UK was reflected by numerous appearances on the long-running music show Top of the Pops, performing singles from Come On Over from 1999. In 2002 an entire special show was dedicated to her on sister show TOTP2, in which she herself introduced some past performances of her greatest hits and singles from Up! In November 2004 she appeared on the annual BBC charity telethon Children in Need. During the show, she performed "Up!", and took part in a magic act in which she was sawn in half by magician Scott Penrose in an illusion called Clearly Impossible.

Eight of the tracks were released as singles in various markets. The first single from the album, "I'm Gonna Getcha Good!" became a top 10 country hit in the US, after debuting at No. 24 after only five days of airplay; but only made the Top 40 on the pop charts. The pop version hit 4 in the UK. In Australia, Germany and France, the song reached the Top 15 in each case. The follow-up single was the title track, which reached the Top 15 in the US country charts but only reached 63 on the pop charts. The second European single, and third single overall, became the mid-tempo song "Ka-Ching!" (which was never released as a single in North America) with lyrics where she was criticizing unchecked consumerism. The song eventually became another hit in the European markets, reaching 1 in Germany and Austria and other European countries, the UK Top 10 and the Top 15 in France.

The fourth single from the album was the most successful in the US, the romantic ballad "Forever and for Always". It was released in April 2003 and peaked at 4 on the country chart, 1 on the Adult Contemporary chart and 20 on the Billboard Hot 100. "Forever and For Always" reached the Top 10 in the UK and Germany. The other four singles from the album were "Thank You Baby! (For Makin' Someday Come So Soon)", "She's Not Just a Pretty Face", "When You Kiss Me" and "It Only Hurts When I'm Breathing". All eight singles had accompanying music videos. The title track "Up!", and "When You Kiss Me" saw release in limited edition to European countries, such as Germany, in early 2004. By January 2008, Up! had sold 5.5 million copies in the US and was certified as 11× platinum (Diamond) by the RIAA. This made her the only female artist in history to have three consecutive albums certified Diamond by the RIAA.

=== 2004–2010: Greatest Hits and delay of new album ===
In 2004 Twain released the Greatest Hits album, with three new tracks. As of 2012 it had sold more than 4.15 million copies in the US. The first single, the multi-format duet "Party for Two", made the country top ten with Billy Currington, while the pop version with Sugar Ray lead singer Mark McGrath made top ten in the United Kingdom and Germany. The follow-up singles, "Don't!" and "I Ain't No Quitter" did not fare as well. The former made Top 20 on Adult Contemporary, while the latter did not gain enough airplay to reach the Country Top 40. In August 2005 she released the single "Shoes" from the Desperate Housewives soundtrack. In late 2006 Twain and Anne Murray recorded a duet version of Murray's hit "You Needed Me" for her 2007 album, Anne Murray Duets: Friends & Legends. This was her final recording with husband Lange as producer; on May 15, 2008, it was announced that she and Lange were separating. Their divorce was finalized in 2010. In June 2009 she explained the delays in the release of her next album, noting she had gone through personal pains and was focusing on raising her son Eja. In August 2009, at a conference in Timmins, Ontario, a spokesman for her label said a new record from Twain was still "nowhere in sight".

=== 2011–2015: Return to music, residency, and tour ===
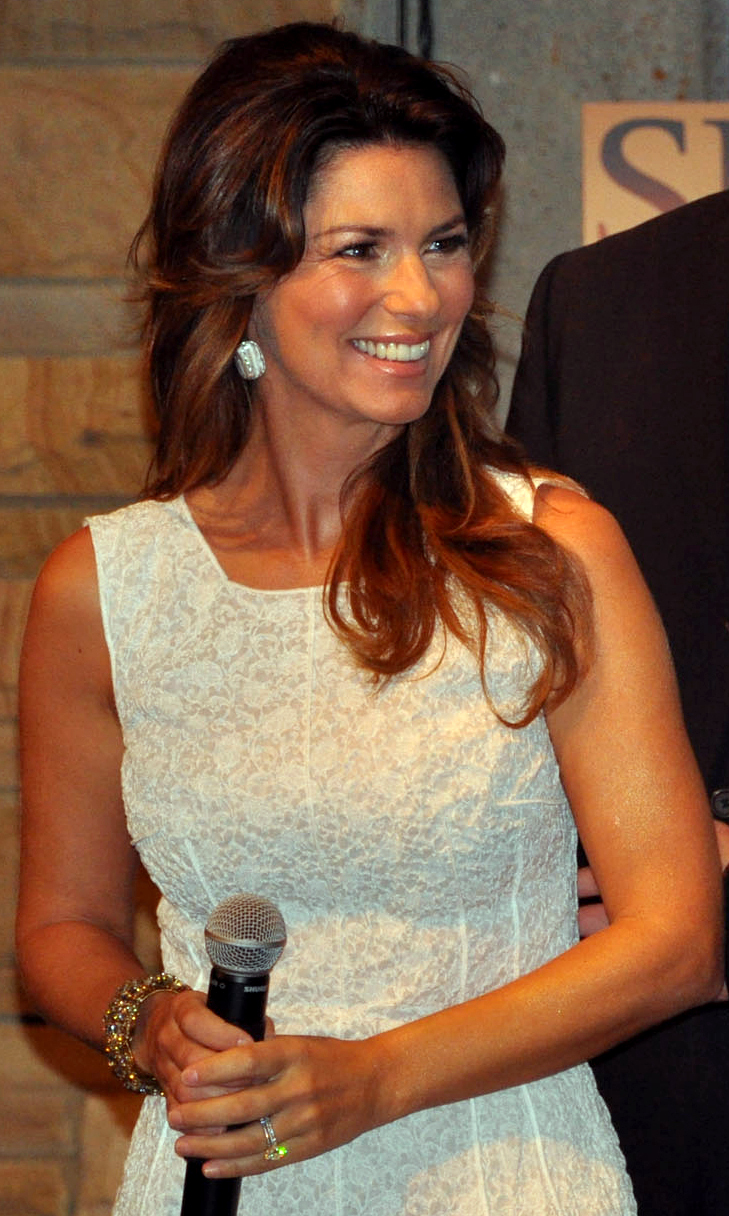
Twain announcing an upcoming Caesars Palace two-year residency, June 2011

In May 2011 Twain confirmed in an interview that she would release her first new single in six years, "Today Is Your Day", after the finale of Why Not? with Shania Twain. She previewed the song in the first episode of the series. She worked with music producers David Foster and Nathan Chapman on the song. She published her autobiography with Atria Books, From This Moment On. The last episode of Why Not? features her and Lionel Richie recording "Endless Love" which would be the first single from his 2012 album Tuskegee. "Today Is Your Day" was officially released to iTunes and country radio on June 12, 2011. In addition to "Today Is Your Day", she collaborated with Michael Bublé on his 2011 album Christmas (also produced by David Foster). She recorded "White Christmas" with Bublé, which was the first single from the album. On June 8, 2011, at a press conference at the Country Music Hall of Fame in Nashville, she announced that she would headline Caesars Palace in Las Vegas for two years. Her show, titled Still the One, ran from December 1, 2012, to December 13, 2014.

In July 2013 she announced on Facebook that she was working on her album over the summer during a break from Still the One. In October 2013 she sat down with Robin Roberts from Good Morning America as a featured artist on the Countdown to the CMA Awards. In the interview she said a new album was coming, and she was still in the process of finding the right producer.

Outside of her residency at Caesars Palace, Twain performed two concerts at the Calgary Stampede in Calgary, Alberta, on July 9 and 10, 2014. In a series of interviews leading up to the shows, she stated that she hoped to tour in 2015 and that it would lead to the release of a new album. Alongside her Calgary performances, she headlined a show on Labour Day weekend in Charlottetown, Prince Edward Island.

On March 4, 2015, Twain announced on Good Morning America that she would embark on her first tour in eleven years. The Rock This Country Tour began June 5 in Seattle, Washington, and concluded on October 27 in Kelowna, British Columbia. During the announcement, she stated the tour would be her last before the release of her fifth studio album, which she intended to record while she was 50. In an interview on Global Television Network's The Morning Show on March 6, she confirmed she was not retiring from music after the tour. In a subsequent interview with Radio.com, she described the material on her upcoming album as "soul music".

On August 24, 2015, Twain provided an update on the album's progress, stating: "I have to finish my new album this winter. Six tracks are already completed. I've written 38 songs in total, and now the process is underway to narrow that down to another six or eight to finish recording." During that time, she also discussed potentially extending the tour overseas and returning to Las Vegas for a new residency in late 2016 or 2017, which would feature both her hits and music from the new album.

=== 2016–2021: Now, second Las Vegas residency ===
In October 2016, Twain confirmed to Rolling Stone that she had new music coming "really soon." In a December 2016 interview with Billboard, she spoke about her forthcoming album, describing the finished product as "kind of schizophrenic musically" while maintaining that "she's the glue." In February 2017, she again spoke to Rolling Stone about the album; select song titles were confirmed as she detailed that she not only hoped to release a single in March but planned to release the album in May. In April 2017, Billboard announced that her new single, "Life's About to Get Good", would premiere in June, with the album projected for release in September. Twain headlined the 2017 Stagecoach Festival in Indio, California, where she previewed her new music for the first time. She performed on the Today Show's "Summer Concert Series" on June 16, 2017.

Her fifth studio album, Now, was released on September 29, 2017, and debuted at number one on the Billboard 200, becoming her second album to do so. In June 2017, she announced on ET Canada that she would tour in support of the album. She officially announced the Now Tour on August 17, 2017. The album's second single, "Swingin' with My Eyes Closed", was released on August 18, 2017. She also released two promotional singles, "Poor Me" and "We've Got Something They Don't", prior to the album's release. In June 2019, she announced her second Las Vegas residency, Let's Go!, which opened on December 6, 2019. The residency concluded on September 10, 2022, following several postponements due to the COVID-19 pandemic.

=== 2022–present: Not Just a Girl, Queen of Me, third Las Vegas residency and Little Miss Twain ===
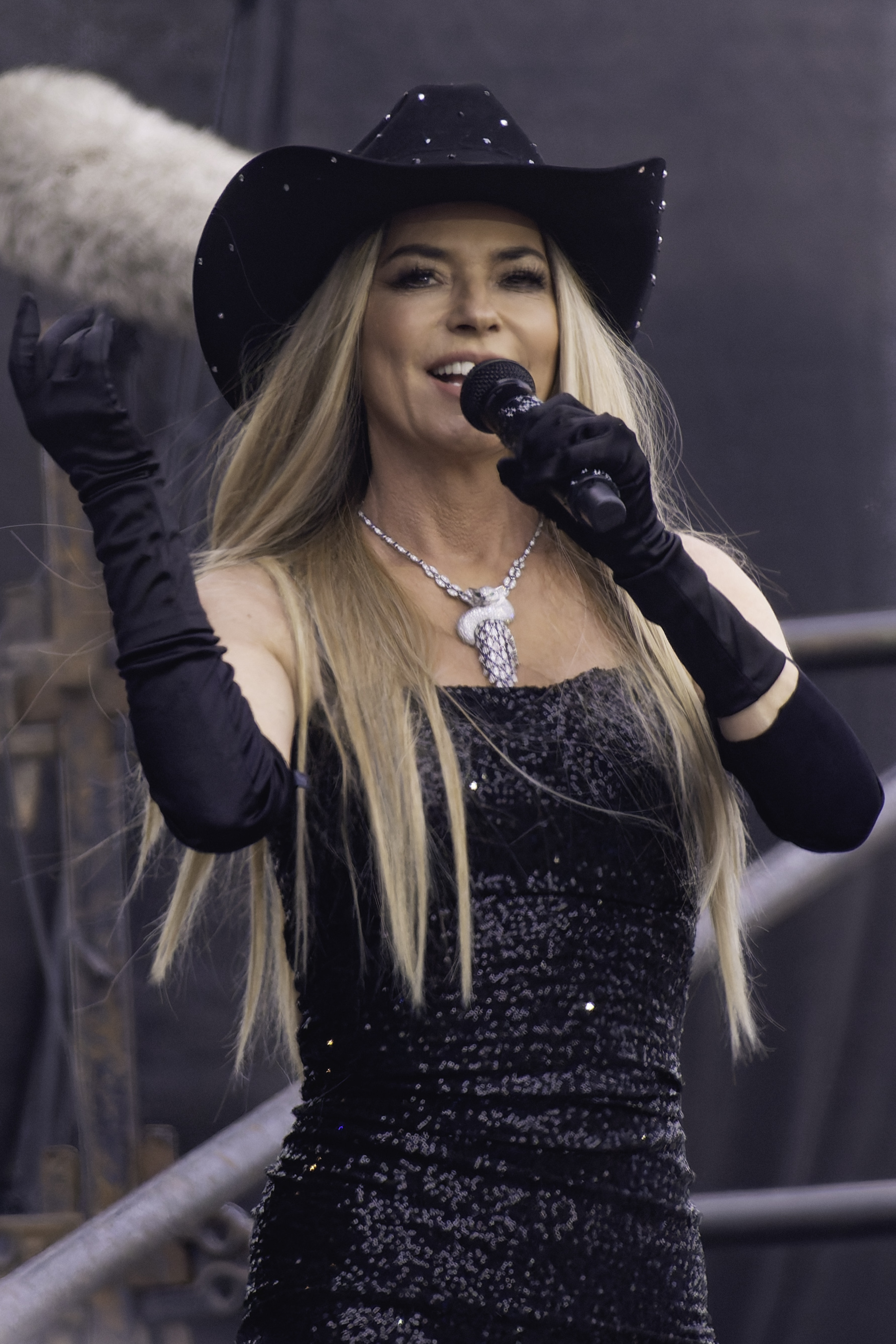
Twain performing at the Glastonbury Festival 2024

In July 2022, a Netflix documentary spanning Twain's career, entitled Not Just A Girl, was released. It was shortlisted for the Rose d'Or 2022 Awards in the Art category. The documentary released simultaneously with a companion compilation album, Not Just a Girl (The Highlights), featuring seventeen previously released songs plus the new title track.

On September 23, 2022, Twain signed with Republic Nashville and released "Waking Up Dreaming" as the lead single from her sixth then-upcoming studio album, Queen of Me. On January 5, 2023, she released the second single off the album, "Giddy Up!" Queen of Me was released on February 3, 2023. It was her first album release under her new label. The album debuted at number 10 on the US Billboard 200, earning 38,000 equivalent album units, with 34,000 of those being album sales, becoming her sixth top-ten album in the country. She joined Madonna as the only women with newly-charting Billboard 200 top 10s in the 1990s, 2000s, 2010s and 2020s (Madonna's streak also includes the 1980s). The album debuted on the Billboard Top Country Albums chart at number 2, earning her her seventh top-five entry on the chart. In Canada, Queen of Me debuted at number two on the Canadian Album Chart, becoming her sixth top-ten album on the chart and seventh overall in the country. In the United Kingdom, Queen of Me debuted atop the UK Albums Chart, becoming her third number one album in the country, after Come On Over (1998) and Now (2017).

On October 22, 2022, Twain announced the Queen of Me Tour across North America and Europe to promote the album. It was her first tour in nearly five years, comprising 76 dates. She featured on the single "Unhealthy", which was released on May 18, 2023, the title track from Anne-Marie's third studio album. The song peaked at number 18 on the UK Singles Chart and became Twain's first top-20 in the region since "Party for Two" in December 2004. On August 15, 2023, she announced her third Las Vegas residency, Shania Twain: Come On Over – The Las Vegas Residency – All The Hits! at Bakkt Theater (now PH Live), scheduled to run from May to December 2024. In March 2024, to commemorate the 65th anniversary of International Women's Day, Twain was one of a number of female celebrities who had their likeness turned into Barbie dolls. In June 2024, she performed in the traditional Sunday Legends slot at the Glastonbury Festival. On September 2, 2024, she announced she would be extending her Las Vegas residency, Shania Twain: Come On Over – The Las Vegas Residency – All The Hits! at PH Live at Planet Hollywood Las Vegas with nine final shows taking place in January and February 2025.

In May 2025, Twain announced a limited tour of summer concerts across the United States and Canada from July to August. This includes festivals, like the Calgary Stampede, Cavendish Beach Music Festival, and the Ottawa Bluesfest, as well as standalone performances.

In 2026, Twain agreed to perform over 12 dates with Harry Styles on the European leg of his world tour, both in London and Amsterdam.

Twain's seventh studio album released on July 24, 2026, Little Miss Twain, reflects her "pre-Shania" youth as Eilleen Regina Twain growing up in the rustic mining town of Timmins, Ontario. The album's lead single, "Dirty Rosie", was released on the same day.

=== TV and film career ===
Twain's mainstream pop acceptance was further helped by her appearance in the 1998 first edition of the VH1 Divas concert where she sang alongside Mariah Carey, Celine Dion, Gloria Estefan, Carole King and Aretha Franklin, and also by VH1's 1999 heavily aired Behind the Music, which concentrated on the tragic aspects of her early life as well as her physical attractiveness and Nashville's early resistance to her bare-midriff music videos. After Divas, she sang background vocals with Lange for Dion's songs, "If Walls Could Talk" and "Goodbye's (The Saddest Word)".

She appeared as herself in the 2004 feature film I Heart Huckabees. On November 12, 2008, she made her first television appearance since her split from Lange, where she appeared as a surprise presenter at the 42nd CMA Awards. In 2009 she served as a guest judge on American Idol, for the show's August 30 and 31 episodes, and in April 2010 she announced plans for her own TV show, titled Why Not? with Shania Twain. The show debuted on May 8, 2011, on Oprah Winfrey Network (OWN). She returned to American Idol as a guest mentor for a week where the top 6 contestants showcased her songs. After the conclusion of the ninth season she was very close to becoming a judge but ultimately it was Jennifer Lopez who got the job.

She guest starred as herself on the Comedy Central series Broad City, in a September 2017 episode titled "Twaining Day", and appeared as a guest judge in the 25th season of Dancing with the Stars during the show's "Movie Night" on October 23, 2017, and performed her song "Soldier". She also appeared as a guest judge on episode five of the 10th Season of Rupaul's Drag Race in 2018.

She competed against singer Meghan Trainor in an episode of TBS's Drop the Mic which aired in January 2018. She was guest of honour for a Lip Sync Battle episode on Paramount Network pitting Derek Hough against Nicole Scherzinger that was dedicated to her and her music. The tribute episode aired June 21, 2018. In November 2018 she appeared in the reality talent show Real Country, as an executive producer and co-presenter with Jake Owen and Travis Tritt. In 2019 she appeared in the film Trading Paint, co-starring alongside John Travolta.

In 2020, she played the role of the mother of singer Jeremy Camp in the biographical film I Still Believe.

In 2023, she appeared on the panel for the second series of ITV's Starstruck, a revived and reformatted version of Stars in Their Eyes, replacing Sheridan Smith. Later that year she appeared in season four, episode seven of the reality series The Kardashians. In 2024 she appeared on the first episode of the Netflix series A Man in Full, a six-episode limited television series adaptation of the novel with Regina King as director and executive producer and David E. Kelley as showrunner. The miniseries was released on May 2, 2024. She guest starred in an episode of the ABC medical drama Doctor Odyssey, which aired on October 3, 2024. She appeared in Andrea Bocelli: 30 The Celebration Concert Film, which released in theaters on November 8, 2024. Shania guest-starred in A Nonsense Christmas with Sabrina Carpenter on December 6, 2024, as part of the Netflix special, Shania played Mrs Claus in a skit and performed "Santa Baby" with Sabrina Carpenter. In 2025, Twain became a judge on the fifth season of Canada's Got Talent.

== Artistry ==
Twain possesses a contralto vocal range. In 1996, Newsweek defended her from detractors who attributed her refusal to tour at the time to her inability to replicate her studio singing live, describing it as "a warm, languid alto sweetened with a wisp of bedroom allure". Admitting that her singing voice is not as strong as it was prior to her Lyme disease diagnosis, she had to learn how to navigate her new voice in order to continue performing. Prior to her diagnosis, several physicians with whom she consulted throughout the years primarily attribute the loss of her voice to emotional stress, from which she has since recovered after experimenting with various relaxation techniques and devoting a lot of time to vocal warmups. She finally received an accurate diagnosis when she saw Dr. Robert Sataloff in Philadelphia who identified that the nerves of her vocal cords were damaged and suggested surgery. In 2018 she underwent laryngoplasty to have Gore-Tex stabilizers implanted in her throat to reduce the workload on her vocal muscles.

She did little writing on her self-titled debut album, but Lange noticed Twain "had a distinctive voice as a songwriter" he felt had been overlooked by other collaborators. Describing Twain and Lange as a "versatile" songwriting duo, Bob Paxman of Sounds Like Nashville observed that their songs explore several themes such as feminism and romantic longing, while Brian D. Johnson from Maclean's said her songs "range from domestic-bliss ballads to sassy rockers that taunt and tease." Alanna Nash of AARP observed that Twain crafted The Woman in Me around "hooky melodies and clever wordplay" from her point of view. During the 1990s record executives feared her lyrics were too "male-threatening"; both The Woman in Me and Come On Over contain feminist and anti-infidelity themes. Although she has become synonymous with singing songs about female empowerment that are "full of attitude", her catalogue also consists of love songs. She believes female singers are often misunderstood for expressing "feminist views" or standing up for themselves, about which she often sings, explaining, "that doesn't mean that we don't love the men in our lives, and that we don't need the men in our lives." She tends to isolate herself when writing songs to avoid distractions, believing she is most productive in this manner. She claims to adapt melancholy experiences into happy songs. Now was the first album she wrote without Lange's involvement, identifying the procedure as a very important songwriting experience because "I needed to do it alone, to start ideas and finish them without relying on anybody else's opinion and direction." Drawing from raw feelings of pain, she also used the album to process the demise of their relationship.

Her primary musical genre is considered to be country pop, with AllMusic critic Stephen Thomas Erlewine declaring that she "Skillfully fus[ed] mainstream, AOR rock production with country-pop". Up is considered to be her most straightforward pop album to-date. Her music has also been labeled as country rock. She maintains that she did not dress provocatively for fame, attention or "shock value" but simply because she enjoys her midriff, claiming to have no regrets about her past outfits. She defends contemporary pop stars who dress provocatively, explaining, "I don't think it's too sexy now ...The boundaries are really up to the individual. And then it's up to the viewer whether they like it or not." She cites Dolly Parton, Mickey Guyton, Taylor Swift, The Chicks, Wynonna Judd, and Kelsea Ballerini as some of the female country artists who inspire her, as well as Karen Carpenter of the American pop rock duo the Carpenters. She has also expressed admiration for country singers Loretta Lynn, Patsy Cline, Tammy Wynette, Reba McEntire, and LeAnn Rimes.

== Public image and reception ==
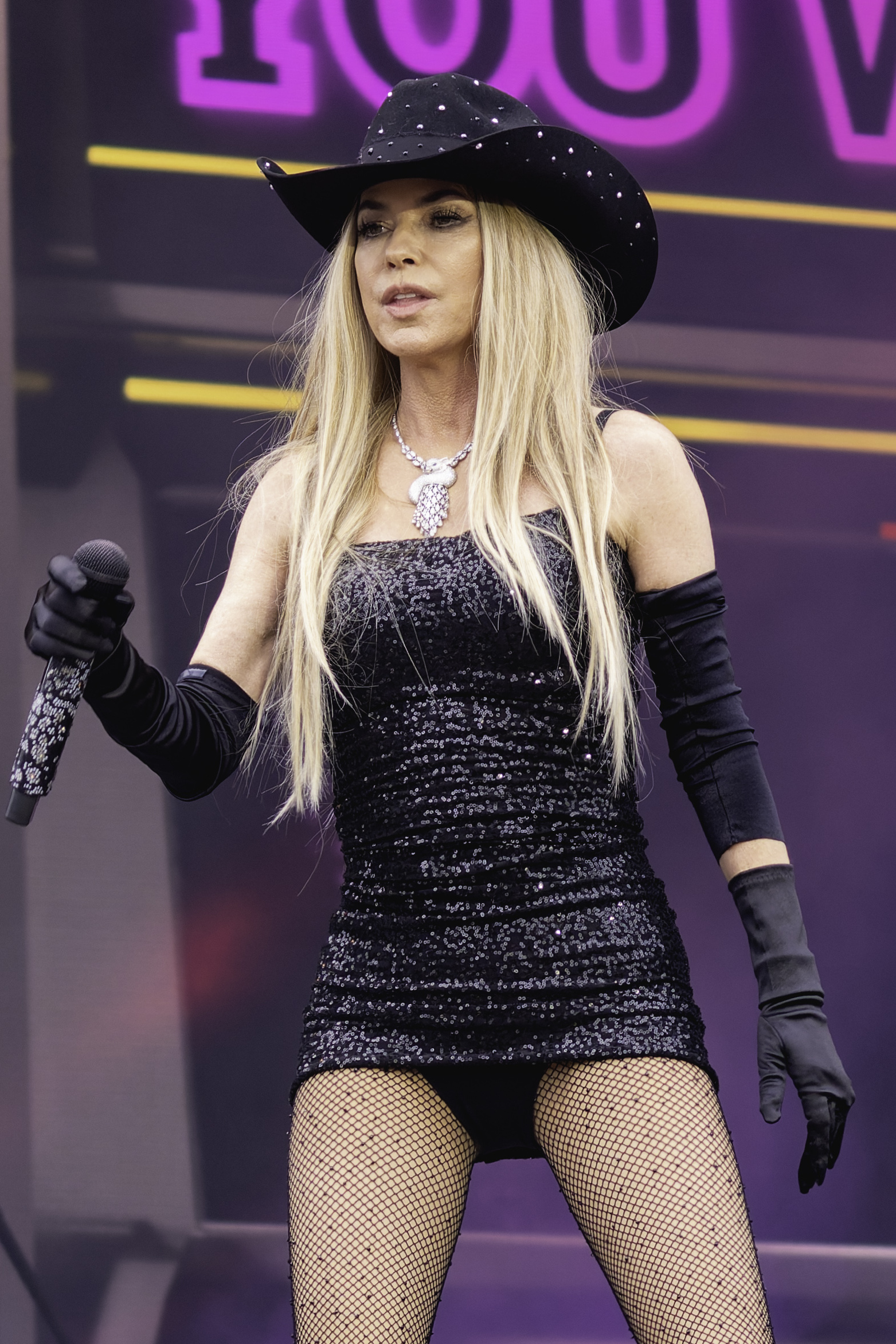
Twain has been criticized for her independence and sexual expressiveness.

Despite her success, Twain has been a divisive figure within country music among purists who initially did not take kindly to her "genre-blending". According to biographer Stephen Thomas Erlewine, most critics accused her of "diluting country with bland, anthemic hard rock techniques and shamelessly selling her records with sexy videos." Some country music critics dismissed her music as not being country enough, which some fans theorize resulted in her breakthrough album The Woman in Me being snubbed at the 1995 Country Music Awards, despite its widespread success. Similar to Garth Brooks before her, she was initially branded an interloper whose modern production, presentation and songwriting "disrupt[ed] the genre's status quo". During the 1990s she often received backlash for her unconventionally liberated appearance as a country music singer. Despite the breakthrough success of The Woman in Me, early detractors did not take her seriously as an artist, with several music journalists questioning her lyrics, the "manufactured" production of her albums, and her singing ability. Such critics concurred that she had little to offer apart from her sex appeal and music videos, often focusing on her physical appearance instead of her music. Early in her career she found herself at odds with the conservative opinions of the country music industry at the time due to her assertive personality and proclivity for wearing revealing outfits that exposed her midriff. She was constantly deprecated for baring her midriff to the point where critics nicknamed it "The most famous midriff in Nashville", while CMT banned the music video for her debut single "What Made You Say That". The Independent's Roisin O'Connor believes "Nashville hadn't seen anything like Twain [before] – a leopard print-loving, midriff-exposing artist determined to be an international star." According to Kristin M. Hall of the Associated Press, since Twain had not yet begun touring, she used music videos to broaden her audience. Similarly, Erlewine considers her to be "the first country artist to fully exploit MTV's style" by cultivating "a sexy, video-oriented image ... that appealed" to both country and pop audiences, largely without touring.

Her record label cautioned her that both men and women would dislike her independence and sexual expressiveness, respectively, but she did not believe them. Record executives warned her that women would feel threatened by her "dressing too sexy". Refusing "to conform to a single archetype of femininity", she recalled that she used music to communicate with like-minded women by alternating between heartbroken, comedic, vengeful, empowered, self-deprecating and lustful personas "all on the same record." Country rock musician Steve Earle famously labelled her "the world's highest-paid lap-dancer." Despite these criticisms her music has largely been embraced by fans. In a 2015 profile on Twain, Maclean's Sonya Bell theorized that Twain's early critics would be shocked by her continued success, while American Songwriter's Joe Vitagliano considers her a testament that "critics and the 'industry' aren't quite the 'be-all, end-all' that they think they are". Sarah Koo of Entertainment Tonight Canada wrote that, in hindsight, Twain's image throughout the 1990s seems tame in comparison to the revealing outfits of artists who have since succeeded her.

At one point she was considered to be among the biggest music stars in the world. Journalist Brian D. Johnson wrote that, despite her girl next door image, Twain "has the sort of star power that people expect from royalty", which he attributes to her Cinderella-esque life story. The Guardian's Simon Hattenstone described her as "sexy, empowering and funny. This was a woman who knew what she wanted – men, action, dancing, control." Calling her equally country, pop and rock star, Hattenstone went on to write that Twain is "fancied by the straight boys, admired by the straight girls, adored by gay men as a camp icon and loved by lesbians who read what they wanted into Man! I Feel Like a Woman!" Claiming her stint hosting the 2003 Juno Awards was noticeably void of diva behaviour despite persistent rumours of outrageous antics and demands at the time, Brad Wheeler of The Globe and Mail described her as "an international icon and Canada's sweetheart", a sentiment with which Juno Awards producer John Brunton agreed. Instead Twain relied on her own security, band, production team and assistants.

== Legacy ==
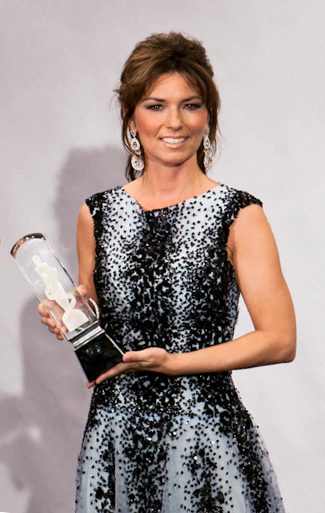
Twain at the 2011 Juno Awards

BBC Online described her as "the real Queen of Pop", highlighting her influence on subsequent successful female artists such as Meghan Trainor, Britney Spears, Taylor Swift and Haim. As one of country music's first crossover stars, the website claims her success as a country-pop crossover artist demonstrates that "she was doing the Taylor Swift thing before Taylor Swift even arrived". Justin Chandler of CBC News credited her with making "country-pop crossover its own genre" and "paving the way for artists sitting atop those same charts every year since". Her record-breaking album The Woman in Me is credited as the one that permanently changed country music as a whole.

Twain's success in the music industry has earned her the honorific nickname the "Queen of Country Pop". By 1998 Maclean's had named her "the reigning queen of country music". American Songwriter contributor Joe Vitagliano named her one of the greatest artists of our time. The New York Times music critic Jon Caramanica named her "Country's Crossover Queen", writing that during her prime she "was both a pop centrist and a country rebel, and many of the aesthetic moves she pioneered ended up, following a period of some resistance, as central to the sound of Nashville". In a ranking of Twain's best songs, Rolling Stone stated that her catalogue of music "ha[s] come to define an era in country music and paved the way for other genre-bending artists that followed". According to Kristin M. Hall of the Associated Press Twain's global success "changed country music for years to come". Nash credits her work on Come On Over with helping to redefine the future of country music. NPR's Jewly Hight wrote that, despite initial derision, Twain eventually "redefin[ed] what country superstardom looked, sounded and behaved like", ultimately influencing a generation of country artists "in making flashier music videos, beefing up their backbeats and staging shows with the energy and theatricality of arena rock".

=== Influence on other artists ===
Taylor Swift credits Twain for her own pop crossover. Swift has cited her as one of her most prominent musical influences. Carrie Underwood states that Twain "paved the way for a lot of us". Underwood believes all similar artists were influenced by Twain, whether or not they realize it. She has been cited as a major influence among Canadian country music artists such as Tenille Arts, Jess Moskaluke, Dean Brody, Lindi Ortega and Brett Kissel. Rapper Post Malone and singer Rihanna have cited her as an inspiration, with the former being infatuated with Twain in his childhood. She covered Malone's song "Rockstar" live during the American Music Awards. Twain has expressed interest in collaborating with him, claiming to have written a song for the two of them in 2019. Singer-songwriter and actor Harry Styles has named her as his biggest influence both "musically and in fashion". Her bold fashion statements also inspired multiple artists. Styles revealed in an interview with Entertainment Tonight that in "I think, both music and fashion", his "main influence was probably Shania Twain". Halsey cited her as one of the artists she was inspired by in her music video "You Should Be Sad".

== Endorsements ==
In January 2005, Twain joined Scentstories by Febreze to create a limited edition scent disc with the proceeds going to Feeding America, formerly America's Second Harvest. In late 2005 she partnered with Coty to produce her namesake fragrance "Shania" by Stetson. A second fragrance was released in September 2007 called "Shania Starlight". On January 1, 2010, she carried the Olympic Torch through her hometown as part of the 2010 Winter Olympics torch relay.

== Personal life ==
Twain met producer Robert John "Mutt" Lange after he heard her original songs and singing from her debut album; he offered to produce and write songs with her. Having spoken on the phone for many months, they met at Nashville's Fan Fair in June 1993 and became close. They were married on December 28, 1993, and had a son, Eja (pronounced "Asia"), on August 12, 2001.

On May 15, 2008, it was announced that they were separating after Lange had an affair with Twain's best friend, Marie-Anne Thiébaud. Their divorce was finalized on June 9, 2010. On December 20, 2010, it was reported that Twain was engaged to Swiss Nestlé executive Frédéric Thiébaud, Marie-Anne's former husband. They were married on January 1, 2011, in Rincón, Puerto Rico. Upon this marriage, Twain became stepmother to Frédéric and Marie-Anne's daughter.

She is a devotee of Sant Mat, an Eastern spiritual philosophy. In 2010, Twain created Shania Kids Can, a charity designed to address the needs of neglected children who are frequently overlooked by social assistance programs. Her autobiography, From This Moment On, was published on March 27, 2011. She is a long-time resident of Corseaux, Switzerland, where her son was born, and she also owns properties in Las Vegas and the Bahamas.

She is a vegetarian.

== Awards and honours ==
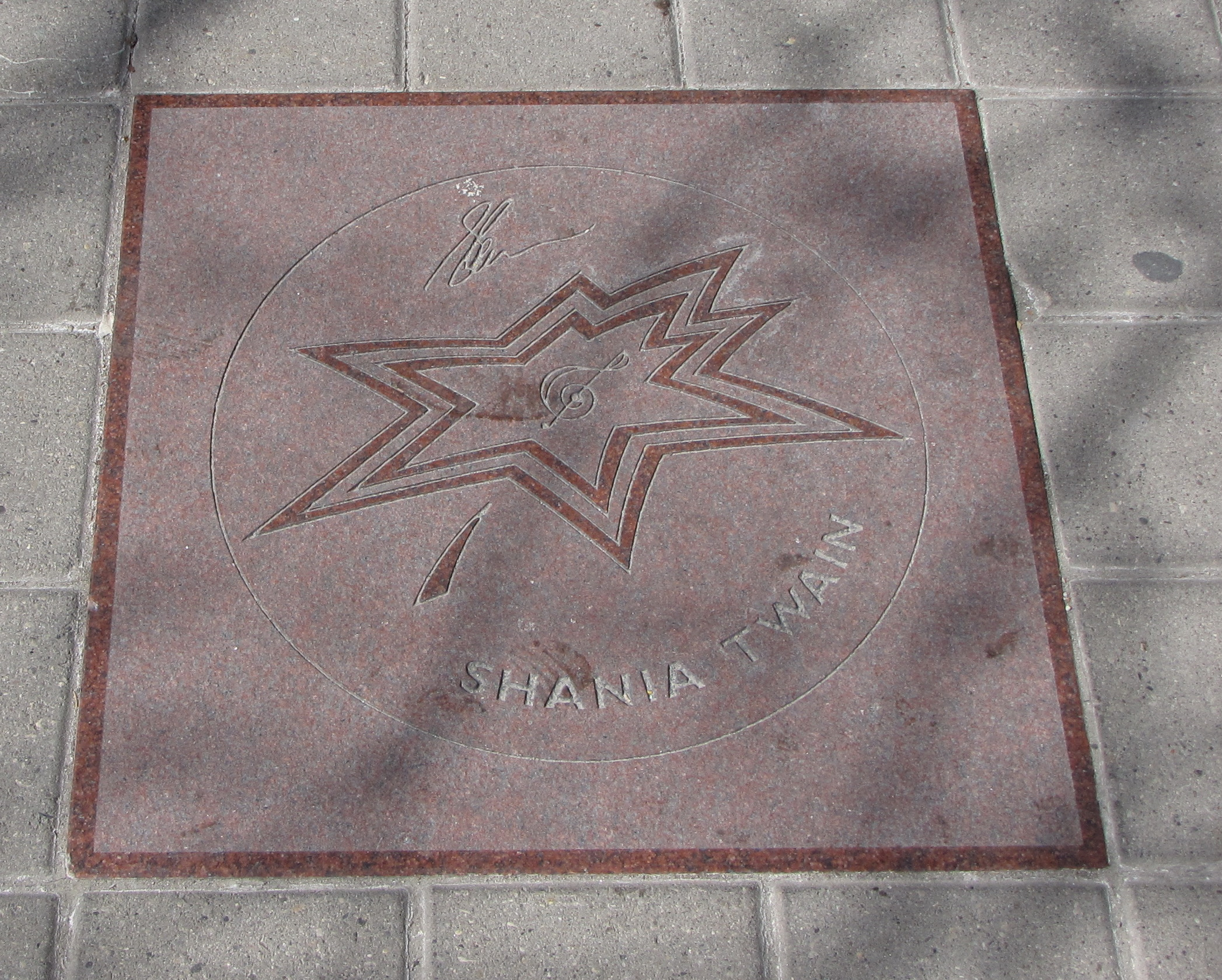
Twain's maple leaf on Canada's Walk of Fame

In addition to her various awards for her singles and albums, Twain has received a number of personal honours:

- She was named the 1999 Entertainer of the Year by both the Academy of Country Music and the Country Music Association; Twain was the first non-US citizen to win the CMA award.
- Twain was ranked No.7 in Country Music Television's 40 Greatest Women of Country Music in 2002.
- In 2003, Twain received a maple leaf on Canada's Walk of Fame.
- The city of Timmins Ontario, renamed a street for her, gave her the key to the city, and built the Shania Twain Centre in her honour.
- On November 18, 2005, Twain was invested as an Officer in the Order of Canada.
- Twain was inducted into the Canadian Music Hall of Fame at the Juno Awards on March 27, 2011.
- On June 2, 2011, Twain received a star on the Hollywood Walk of Fame. Her star is the 2,442nd Star on the Hollywood Walk of Fame in the Category of Recording.
- On December 9, 2016, Twain received the third-ever Billboard Women in Music Icon Award for her extraordinary accomplishment and historic contributions to the industry and artistry.
- In 2016, Twain was declared the "Artist of a Lifetime" by CMT and was given a special award during the 2016 Artists of the Year ceremony. She is the first woman to receive this honour.
- In June 2017, Twain had her own exhibit at the Country Music Hall of Fame titled Shania Twain: Rock This Country. It ran through 2018.
- In 2018, Twain was announced as the second recipient of the CCMA Generation Award.
- In August 2022, Twain received the Poet's Award from the Academy of Country Music honouring her songwriting
- In October 2022, Twain was inducted into the Nashville Songwriters Hall of Fame.
- In December 2022, Twain received the Music Icon Award at the 48th People's Choice Awards.
- On April 2, 2023, Twain received the CMT Equal Play Award at the 2023 CMT Music Awards. The award recognizes trailblazers who are using their platform to break barriers, speak out against injustices, and challenge the status quo.

== Discography ==
- Shania Twain (1993)
- The Woman in Me (1995)
- Come On Over (1997)
- Up! (2002)
- Now (2017)
- Queen of Me (2023)
- Little Miss Twain (2026)

== Filmography ==
As actress
Year	Title	Role	Notes
2019	Trading Paint	Becca	Film
2020	I Still Believe	Teri Camp	Film
2021	For Love	Narrator	Voice
2022	Beauty and the Beast: A 30th Celebration	Mrs. Potts	Television film
2024–2025	Doctor Odyssey	Heather	2 episodes
2025	Easy's Waltz		Film

As herself
Year	Title	Role	Notes
2004	I Heart Huckabees	Herself	Film
2011	Why Not? With Shania Twain	Herself	OWN documentary; 6 episodes
2017	Broad City	Herself	Episode: "Twaining Day"
2018	RuPaul's Drag Race	Guest Judge	Episode: "The Bossy Rossy Show"
2021	Fairfax	Herself	Voice; Episode: "Chernobylfest"
2021	Anne Murray: Full Circle	Herself	CBC Television documentary
2022	Not Just a Girl	Herself	Netflix documentary
2022	Monarch	Herself	Episode: "There Can Only Be One Queen"
2023	Shania Twain at the BBC	Herself	A collection of some of Shania's biggest hits performed at the BBC.
2023	The Kardashians	Herself	Episode: "A Short-Term Fight"
2024	A Man in Full	Herself	Episode: "Saddlebags"
2024	Andrea Bocelli 30: The Celebration	Herself	Concert film
2024	A Nonsense Christmas with Sabrina Carpenter	Herself	Netflix Christmas special
2025	Canada's Got Talent	Herself/Judge	Season 5

== Tours ==
Co-headlining tours

- Triple Play Tour (1993; with John Brannen and Toby Keith)

Headlining tours

- Come On Over Tour (1998–1999)
- Up! Tour (2003–2004)
- Rock This Country Tour (2015)
- Now Tour (2018)
- Queen of Me Tour (2023)
- The Places I'll Go Tour (2027)

Residencies

- Shania: Still the One (2012–2014)
- Let's Go! (2019–2022)
- Come On Over - All The Hits! (2024–2025)

== See also ==
- List of Canadian Grammy Award winners and nominees
- Music of Canada
- Forbes list of highest-earning musicians

Awards
Preceded by Christina Aguilera	People's Music Icon; 2021	Incumbent

Preceded by Sass Jordan & Michel Pagliaro	Grey Cup Halftime Show; 2002	Succeeded by Bryan Adams
