= Henk Wijngaard =

Dutch country singer

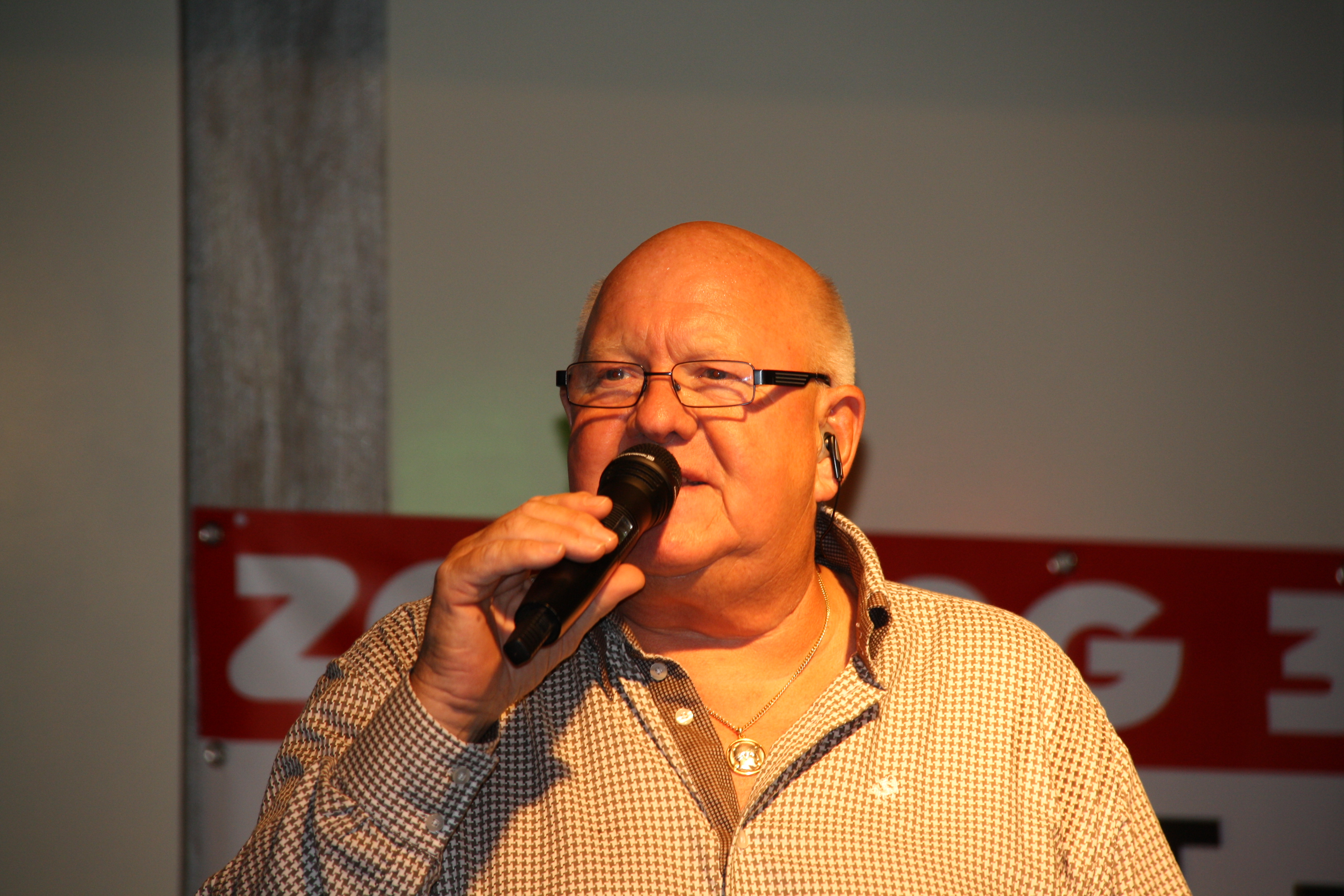
- Wijngaard in 2012
- Born: 13 June 1946 (age 80); Stadskanaal, Groningen, Netherlands
- Occupation: Musician
- Years active: 1978–present
- Relatives: Shania Twain (half-niece)

Henk Wijngaard (born 13 June 1946) is a Dutch country singer.

== Personal life ==
Henk was born in Stadskanaal on June 13, 1946.

Wijngaard's mother was a refugee from France and his father a Canadian allied soldier. When he turned 14, his mother bought him a guitar. However, lessons proved unfulfilling, so an acquaintance taught him a few chords to start playing. He was initially employed on a merchant ship, where he continued to make music. After coming ashore, he decided to become a truck driver. In 1976, he released his first single, "B'dai dai die/In m'n cabine" on Telstar Records. In 1978 he had his breakthrough hit with the self-penned song, "Met de vlam in de pijp". After this followed 20 further Dutch Top 40 hits, many on the themes of truck driving, the most famous being "Ik zie de wereld door de voorruit van mijn wagen" lit. 'I See The World From The Windshield Of My Truck'

Wijngaard is the paternal half-brother of Clarence Edwards, the father of Canadian country singer Shania Twain.

Wijngaard's "Ik zie de wereld" won the title of Best Non-English Song at the 1978 International Country Music Awards in Bristol, Tennessee.

In 2026, Henk Wijngaard celebrated 50 years of music with a concert in Nieuwleusen, during which a restored Scania truck was presented.

== Discography ==
Singles (Dutch chart positions)

- 1976 "B'dai dai die"
- 1977 "Wagen volgeladen"
- 1977 "Stoere Jongens uit het Noorden"
- 1977 "Zomertijd/kunnen wij elkaar niet vergeven"
- 1978 "Met de vlam in de Pijp" (#6)
- 1978 "Ik Heb M'n Wagen Volgeladen" (#20)
- 1978 "Nachtrijders" (#25)
- 1979 "Kilometervreters" (#26)
- 1979 "Asfaltrockers" (#32)
- 1980 "Containersong" (#11)
- 1981 "Truck als Mn woning" (#22)
- 1981 "Oh Suzanne"
- 1981 "Als chauffeur ben ik geboren" (#36)
- 1982 "Bak roest op 18 wielen" (#30)
- 1982 "Truckcarrace" (#39)
- 1983 "Trucker Olè" (#33)
- 1983 "Blij dat ik rij"
- 1983 "Wie niet weg is"
- 1983 "Nachtrijders"
- 1984 "Samen in een Truck", Duet with Irene Lardy
- 1984 "Aan elke vrouw waar ik..."
- 1984 "Weg van de snelweg"
- 1984 "Wat een baan"
- 1986 "Gooi nog eens een blok op het vuur schat"
- 1986 "Jimmy is Lazarus"
- 1987 "120 Varken naar Beiroet"
- 1987 "Deze jongen gaat naar huis"
- 1988 "Zo rij ik Europa rond"
- 1988 "Sneeuwwittebruidsjurk" (#16)
- 1989 "Zo, zoals je bent"
- 1989 "Rijk als een koning"
- 1989 "Radio Noord - Er zijn zoveel mooie steden"
- 1990 "Die kleine deur naar 't paradijs" (#35)
- 1990 "He Suzie" (#8)
- 1990 "Als ik ga moet je niet om me huilen"
- 1991 "Ik moet nog wat jaren mee" (#12)
- 1991 "Ik ben veel liever alleen" (#32)
- 1992 "Kijk uit hier ben ik" (#35)
- 1992 "Rosie" (#31)
- 1993 "Teken van leven"
- 1993 "Beun de Beunhaas" (#29)
- 1994 "De zon schijnt weer in m'n cabine" (#38)
- 1994 "Ik heb jou"
- 1994 "Heimwee naar jou"
- 1995 "Ik ben voor de liefde"
- 1995 "De vlam is gedoofd"
- 1996 "Ma petite boom boom"
- 1996 "Doar zakt mie de broek van af"
- 1997 "Geloof, Hoop en Liefde"
- 1997 "Mijn Daffy Duck"
- 1998 "18 Wielen"
- 1998 "Kleine waker"
- 1999 "Ik ben een oorlogskind"
- 1999 "In mijn cabine"
- 2001 "Geboren als een trucker"
- 2002 "Sophie"
- 2004 "Zolang de motor draait"
- 2004 "Meisie meisie"
- 2005 "Het Zwarte Asfalt"
- 2006 "Was ik maar een Dichter"
- 2019 "Tranen op het stuur"
- 2020 "Met De Vlam In De Pijp (2020 Versie)
- 2020 "Mijn Groningen"
- 2020 "Met Piet-Cees in Den Haag"
- 2021 "Geheime Leidjes"
- 2021 "Met De Vlam in De Pijp (Ode Aan MAX)
- 2022 "Meener Poetin/Mister Putin"
- 2022 "Hit The Road Medley"
- 2022 "Het Klokje Rond"
- 2023 "Zonder Boer Geen Voer"
- 2023 "Dat Is Wat Mijn Opa Zei"
- 2023 "Vlam in De Pijp (Trek & Pull)"
- 2026 "Op De Cross" Collaboration with Beatcrooks
