= Little Miss Twain =

Studio album by Shania Twain
- Released: July 24, 2026
- Recorded: 2024–2026
- Genre: Country
- Length: 49:46
- Label: Republic
- Producers: Ammo; Eren Cannata; Zach Dawes; Gitty; Eja Lange; David Paich; Justin Tranter; Shania Twain

Shania Twain chronology
Queen of Me (2023)	Little Miss Twain (2026)

Singles from Little Miss Twain
- 1. "Dirty Rosie" Released: May 13, 2026

Little Miss Twain is the seventh studio album by the Canadian singer and songwriter Shania Twain. It was released on July 24, 2026, by Republic Records, marking her second album with the label following Queen of Me (2023). Produced by Zach Dawes, the album features collaborations with Tanya Tucker, Josh Homme and The War and Treaty. Described as one of the most personal and reflective albums of her career, Twain opted to return fully to her country music roots for the project, which was inspired by her childhood and early days of performing in Timmins, Ontario.

Little Miss Twain received positive reviews from music critics. Praise was especially given to Twain's more personal lyrics. The album was preceded by the single "Dirty Rosie" and the promotional singles "Little Miss Twain" and "Faded Blue Jeans". Commercially, it has charted within the top 30 in Australia, Austria, Belgium, Canada, Germany, Scotland, Switzerland, and the United Kingdom.

== Background ==
After a lengthy period of not releasing music, Twain released Queen of Me on February 3, 2023, the first album not to be released on her long-time label Mercury Nashville. It received generally favorable reviews and was a commercial success, reaching the top of the charts in United Kingdom, her third to do so, and the top ten in Australia, Switzerland, the United States, and her native Canada. Twain embarked on the Queen of Me Tour in 2023, followed by the Come On Over - All The Hits residency at the Bakkt Theater in Las Vegas from May 2024 to February 2025, followed by a series of festival dates across the United States and Canada.

Work on Twain's seventh studio album began with writing sessions in early 2024, and was paused temporarily for the Vegas residency, before resuming in between Twain's festival dates throughout 2025, with recording primarily taking place in the Bahamas. She said her return to touring gave her a renewed burst of creativity and the opportunity to reflect on her career to date in light of her turning sixty. In an Instagram post celebrating the end of the residency, Twain teased that she would be returning to the studio to write and record new music. Of the completion of the album, Twain stated, "I know that this world isn't systemically built to nurture a woman of my age releasing music, but I feel more in tune with myself than ever — strong, inspired, and full of creative energy. Thank you to my fans who stay with me through the process — you are my inspiration."

Little Miss Twain was officially announced on May 13, 2026 alongside the release of lead single "Dirty Rosie". Twain explained that the album draws on her formative years and early musical influences, and reflects on identity, ambition and the environments that shaped her, stating in a press release accompanying the announcement, "a lot of Little Miss Twain is reflective of my teens, my roots as well as the energy of the rock and R&B I loved so much, but still with that Western twang. Where I’m from you don’t go anywhere on a horse — you go on a snowmobile. I was dreaming about the Western lifestyle and I was living in a very different world than where I ended up." Speaking further on the projects themes, Twain said, "the album was written storywise and also sonically, musically, based on a lot of reflection on my childhood, whether it’s stories reflecting back to my youth or whether it is music that influenced me most as a child and as a teen. I’ve brought all of that together."

On June 26, the title track, which features Country Music Hall of Fame member Tanya Tucker, was released as a promotional single. Discussing the song, which looks back at her early life in Canada, Twain explained, "it explains my childhood and my experience as a young artist, but also how important Tanya’s music is in my life. I was reflecting on the naivete of becoming the next Tanya Tucker — no one in the music industry was going to see me and think that, but my mother was sure that somehow along the way it was going to happen. I often wonder what she would have thought if she could’ve seen what’s happened in my life."

The full track list for the album was revealed on June 30, with Twain stating, "alright, I’ve kept these songs under my hat long enough… Here’s the full tracklist for ‘Little Miss Twain’. Some of these songs have been with me for a long time, some surprised me and a few may cause a little trouble. I cannot wait for you to hear them all."

"Faded Blue Jeans", was released as the second promotional single, and the final song to be released prior to the album, on July 10. Described as a blues-inspired country rock track, the song features Queens of the Stone Age frontman Josh Homme and depicts Twain reflecting on a trusty pair of jeans and how they remind her of a past relationship. Of the song, she stated, "this is a song about young love or is it lust? I’m never without a trusty pair of faded blue jeans..they’ve been with me through just about every chapter of my life."

== Critical reception ==
Professional ratings
Aggregate scores
Source	Rating
AnyDecentMusic?	6.1/10
Metacritic	67/100
Review scores
Source	Rating
Clash	8/10
The Guardian	3/5 stars
Pitchfork	6.8/10
Slant Magazine	3/5 stars

According to the review aggregator Metacritic, Little Miss Twain received "generally favorable reviews" based on a weighted average score of 67 out of 100 from six critic scores. The review aggregator AnyDecentMusic? gave the album a weighted average score of 6.1 out of 10 from seven critic scores.

== Track listing ==
=== CD/digital releases ===
Little Miss Twain – Standard edition
No.	Title	Writer(s)	Producer(s)	Length
1.	"Stranger Things"	Shania Twain; Joshua Coleman; Jacob Kasher Hindlin; Jake Torrey	Ammo; Sean Phelan^{[v]}	3:18
2.	"Right Time"	Twain; Eja Lange; David Paich	Twain; Eren Cannata; Lange; Paich	2:59
3.	"Little Miss Twain" (featuring Tanya Tucker)	Twain	Zach Dawes	4:15
4.	"Dirty Rosie"	Twain	Dawes; Michael Shuman^{[a]}	2:45
5.	"Quit My Life"	Twain; Bianca Atterberry; Cannata; Justin Tranter	Tranter; Cannata^{[c]}	2:46
6.	"Problematic"	Atterberry; Cannata; Tranter	Gitty; Cannata^{[c]}; Drew McKeon^{[a]}	3:24
7.	"Scary Little Thing"	Twain; Cannata; Tranter	Cannata; Tranter	3:10
8.	"I'd Be Loving Me"	Twain; Tyler Carter; Dru DeCaro; Lange; Ray Parker Jr.; Gianna Taylor	Gitty; McKeon^{[a]}	3:20
9.	"Faded Blue Jeans" (featuring Josh Homme)	Twain	Dawes	2:31
10.	"Northern Town"	Twain	Dawes	3:55
11.	"That's the Money"	Twain	Gitty; McKeon^{[a]}	3:56
12.	"Down the Middle"	Twain; Atterberry; Cannata; Tranter	Gitty; Cannata^{[c]}; McKeon^{[a]}	3:15
13.	"Take It to the River" (featuring the War and Treaty)	Twain; Denise Rich; Ronnie Wood	Dawes	3:45
14.	"New Love"	Twain; Atterberry; Cannata; Tranter	Tranter; Cannata^{[c]}	3:22
15.	"Rockstars"	Twain	Gitty; McKeon^{[a]}	3:05
Total length:				49:46

Little Miss Twain – Apple Music bonus track
No.	Title	Writer(s)	Producer(s)	Length
16.	"We Just Met"	Twain; Lange; Decaro; Taylor; Carter	Dawes	2:48
Total length:				52:34

Little Miss Twain – Amazon CD bonus track
No.	Title	Writer(s)	Producer(s)	Length
16.	"Hate That Way"	Twain; Tranter; Cannata; Atterberry	Tranter; Cannata^{[c]}	2:46
Total length:				52:32

Little Miss Twain – Walmart, HMV, and JPC CD bonus track
No.	Title	Writer(s)	Producer(s)	Length
16.	"What's Going on in There"	Twain	Gitty	2:53
Total length:				52:39

Little Miss Twain: The Places I'll Go – Digital deluxe edition
No.	Title	Writer(s)	Producer(s)	Length
16.	"Who Do You Love" (featuring the Milk Carton Kids)	Twain	Dawes	2:59
17.	"What's Going on in There"	Twain	Gitty	2:53
18.	"Trippin on Good Luck"	Twain	Dawes	2:30
19.	"We Just Met"	Twain; Lange; Decaro; Taylor; Carter	Dawes	2:48
20.	"Hate That Way"	Twain; Tranter; Cannata; Atterberry	Tranter; Cannata^{[c]}	2:46
21.	"The Places I'll Go"	Twain	Dawes	4:50
Total length:				68:32

Greatest Hits: Setlist Edition – UK disc 2
No.	Title	Length
1.	"Don't Be Stupid (You Know I Love You)"
2.	"Up!"
3.	"I'm Gonna Getcha Good!"
4.	"Giddy Up!"
5.	"Any Man of Mine"
6.	"Whose Bed Have Your Boots Been Under?"
7.	"You're Still the One"
8.	"(If You're Not in It for Love) I'm Outta Here!"
9.	"That Don't Impress Me Much"
10.	"Man! I Feel Like a Woman!"

=== Vinyl releases ===
Little Miss Twain – Standard edition
No.	Title	Writer(s)	Producer(s)	Length
1.	"Little Miss Twain" (featuring Tanya Tucker)	Twain	Dawes	4:15
2.	"Stranger Things"	Twain; Coleman; Hindlin; Torrey	Ammo; Phelan^{[v]}	3:18
3.	"Right Time"	Twain; Lange; Paich	Twain; Cannata; Lange; Paich	2:59
4.	"Dirty Rosie"	Twain	Dawes; Shuman^{[a]}	2:45
5.	"I'd Be Loving Me"	Twain; Carter; DeCaro; Lange; Parker Jr.; Taylor	Gitty; McKeon^{[a]}	3:20
6.	"Faded Blue Jeans" (featuring Josh Homme)	Twain	Dawes	2:31
7.	"Rockstars"	Twain	Gitty; McKeon^{[a]}	3:05
8.	"Northern Town"	Twain	Dawes	3:55
9.	"That's the Money"	Twain	Gitty; McKeon^{[a]}	3:56
10.	"Problematic"	Atterberry; Cannata; Tranter	Gitty; Cannata^{[c]}; McKeon^{[a]}	3:24
11.	"Down the Middle"	Twain; Atterberry; Cannata; Tranter	Gitty; Cannata^{[c]}; McKeon^{[a]}	3:15
12.	"Take It to the River" (featuring the War and Treaty)	Twain; Rich; Wood	Dawes	3:45
Total length:				40:55

Little Miss Twain – Mattagami River vinyl bonus track (official store)
No.	Title	Writer(s)	Producer(s)	Length
13.	"We Just Met"	Twain; Lange; Decaro; Taylor; Carter	Dawes	2:48
Total length:				43:43

Little Miss Twain – Amazon vinyl bonus track
No.	Title	Writer(s)	Producer(s)	Length
13.	"Hate That Way"	Twain; Tranter; Cannata; Atterberry	Tranter; Cannata^{[c]}	2:46
Total length:				43:41

Little Miss Twain – Target, HMV, and JPC vinyl bonus track
No.	Title	Writer(s)	Producer(s)	Length
13.	"Trippin on Good Luck"	Twain	Dawes	2:30
Total length:				43:25

=== Notes ===
- ^{^[a]} signifies an additional producer
- ^{^[c]} signifies a co-producer
- ^{^[v]} signifies a vocal producer
- All tracks on Greatest Hits: Setlist Edition written by Twain and Robert John "Mutt" Lange, and produced by R. Lange, except "Giddy Up!", written by Twain, Samuel Romans, Jessica Agombar and David Stewart, and produced by Stewart.

== Personnel ==
Credits are adapted from Tidal.

=== Musicians ===
- Shania Twain – vocals (all tracks), banjo (track 4)
- Ammo – background vocals, drums, guitar, keyboards (1)
- Davide Rossi – cello, viola, violin (1)
- Jake Torrey – background vocals, guitar (1)
- Daniel "Sahaj" Ticotin – guitar (1)
- David Paich – keyboards (2, 3); background vocals, Hammond B3 (2); flute, Mellotron, pump organ (3)
- Eja Lange – background vocals (2, 3)
- Luke Black – banjo, guitar (2, 4); background vocals (4)
- Josiah Nelson – fiddle (2, 4), background vocals (4)
- Drury Anderson – mandolin (2), background vocals (4)
- Ray Parker Jr. – guitar (2, 5, 7)
- Aaron Janik – horn (2), trumpet (5, 7)
- Gregg Bissonette – drums, percussion (2, 10)
- Nathan East – bass guitar (2)
- Kenneth Pattengale – acoustic guitar (3, 4, 10), 12-string acoustic guitar (3)
- T Bone Burnett – electric guitar (3, 4), acoustic guitar (3)
- Eren Cannata – guitar (3, 5–7, 10, 14), background vocals (3, 5, 6, 10, 12, 14), percussion (5, 7, 14), keyboards (5, 7), bass guitar (10); drums, drum machine, drum programming, piano (14)
- Bianca Atterberry – background vocals (3, 5, 6, 12, 14)
- Russ Pahl – acoustic guitar, electric guitar, pedal steel guitar (3, 10); bass guitar (3); banjo, baritone guitar (9)
- Stella Mozgawa – drums (3, 9, 10), percussion (9, 10)
- Gabe Witcher – fiddle (3, 9), acoustic guitar (9)
- Tanya Tucker – background vocals (3)
- Nick Sena – Mellotron (3)
- Jay Bellerose – percussion (3, 4, 10), drums (4, 9, 10, 13)
- Jon Brion – electric guitar (4, 9), slide guitar (9)
- Tommy Brenneck – electric guitar, Hammond B3 (4); acoustic guitar, organ (9)
- Freddie Washington – background vocals, bass guitar (4, 11); acoustic guitar (15)
- Sam Wilson – background vocals (4)
- Michael Shuman – programming (4)
- Justin Tranter – background vocals (5–7)
- Derek Cobbs – Wurlitzer organ (5, 7), Hammond B3 (5)
- Dmitry Gorodetsky – bass guitar (5, 7)
- Dan Crean – drums (5, 7)
- Jason Soda – guitar (5, 7)
- Ross Garren – harmonica (5, 7)
- Richie Cannata – saxophone (5, 7)
- Ozzie Melendez – trombone (5, 7)
- Donnell Spencer Jr. – background vocals (5, 8, 11, 15)
- Drew McKeon – drums (6, 8, 11, 12, 15)
- Jeff "Gitty" Gitelman – drum programming, electric guitar (6, 8, 11, 12, 15); keyboards (11, 15); banjo, tambourine (11); piano, synthesizer (15)
- Nathan Pence – upright bass (6, 8, 12)
- Claudia Cunningham – background vocals (7)
- Joslynn James – background vocals (7)
- Yvette Barlowe – background vocals (8, 15)
- Rich Hinman – pedal steel guitar (8)
- Josh Homme – background vocals (9)
- Tyler Parkford – piano (9)
- Dennis Crouch – upright bass (10), bass guitar (13)
- Joey Ryan – acoustic guitar (10)
- Andres Conde – background vocals (11)
- Frédéric Thiébaud – whistle (11)
- Godfrey Furchtgott – strings (12, 14)
- Greg Leisz – electric guitar, mandolin (13)
- The War and Treaty – background vocals (13)
- Ronnie Wood – electric guitar (13)
- Jebin Bruni – piano (13)

=== Technical ===
- Sean Phelan – engineering
- Ammo – engineering (1)
- Stefan Gfeller – engineering (2, 4, 9, 13)
- Jason Wormer – engineering (3, 4, 9, 10)
- Greg Koller – engineering (4, 9), mixing (13)
- Olle Romo – vocal engineering (10, 14, 15)
- Milan Beker – engineering assistance (1, 6)
- Rob Christie – engineering assistance (2, 3, 8, 10, 12)
- Weston Wilson – engineering assistance (2, 3)
- Jake Prein – engineering assistance (4, 5, 7, 9)
- Kevin Brunhober – engineering assistance (11, 13–15)
- Rich Evatt – additional engineering (2, 4, 8, 10, 12, 13)
- John Arbuckle – additional engineering (5, 7)
- Tariq Bevans – additional engineering (13)
- Alex Ghenea – mixing (1–12, 14, 15)
- Matt Colton – mastering
- Daniel Holder – production assistance (2, 8, 10, 12, 13)
- Kevin Cartwright – production assistance (2, 8, 10, 12, 13)
- Wilfried Haslauer – production assistance (2, 8, 10, 12, 13)

== Charts ==
Chart performance for Little Miss Twain
Chart (2026)	Peak position
Australian Albums (ARIA)	30
Australian Country Albums (ARIA)	4
Austrian Albums (Ö3 Austria)	24
Belgian Albums (Ultratop Flanders)	23
Belgian Albums (Ultratop Wallonia)	14
Canadian Albums (Billboard)	20
Dutch Albums (Album Top 100)	73
French Albums (SNEP)	195
German Albums (Offizielle Top 100)	19
German Pop Albums (Offizielle Top 100)	8
Norwegian Physical Albums (IFPI Norge)	5
Scottish Albums (Official Charts)	2
Swiss Albums (Schweizer Hitparade)	14
UK Albums (Official Charts)	7
UK Americana Albums (Official Charts)	1
UK Country Albums (Official Charts)	1
US Billboard 200	131
US Top Country Albums (Billboard)	26
