= What Made You Say That =

Single by Shania Twain

from the album Shania Twain
- B-side: "Crime of the Century"
- Released: March 6, 1993
- Recorded: 1992
- Studio: Music Mill (Nashville, TN)
- Genre: Country pop
- Length: 2:59
- Label: Polygram; Mercury Nashville
- Songwriters: Tony Haselden; Stan Munsey, Jr.
- Producers: Harold Shedd; Norro Wilson

Shania Twain singles chronology
"What Made You Say That" (1993)	"Dance with the One That Brought You" (1993)

Music video
- "What Made You Say That" on YouTube

"What Made You Say That" is the debut single by Canadian country music artist Shania Twain. It was released by Polygram and Mercury Nashville as the lead single to her eponymous debut album (1993) on March 6, 1993. The song was written by Tony Haselden and Stan Munsey Jr. and produced by Harold Shedd and Norro Wilson, who also produced her album. The song was initially recorded by American country singer and actor Wayne Massey for his third album Wayne Massey and Black Hawk (1989).

Despite a heavily played video, the track only charted at number 55 on the US Billboard Hot Country Songs chart and number 70 on the Canadian RPM Country Tracks chart. The track was not included on her 2004 Greatest Hits collection but was included in her 2022 compilation Not Just a Girl (The Highlights), the only song off her debut album to be included. Twain would perform the track on a few occasions, most notably at the 1993 CCMA Awards and her debut tour Come On Over Tour. On the latter, she would bring a child who had won a local radio contest to perform the song while Twain provided backing vocals. One of these children was a then-unknown Avril Lavigne.

== Critical reception ==
Larry Flick from Billboard magazine reviewed the song as "sassy, buoyant, catchy, and supported by an alluring video." Brad Hogue of Cash Box put the track under his "Feature Picks", saying, "Twain's vocals are strong, and alternate between seductive trite and sincerity." Kevin John Coyne of Country Universe, in a retrospective interview, rated the song a C, criticizing the "dated on arrival" production and saying that Twain's playful vocals and a "catchy" hook was what saved it from being a "total dud." Pan-European magazine Music & Media wrote, "The Canadian country singer has a warmly beating heart which can adapt itself to various emotions. In an assertivemood she listens to her heart, to sing the pop ditty 'What Made You Say That'."

== Chart performance ==
"What Made You Say That" entered the US Billboard Hot Country Songs chart (then known as "Hot Country Singles & Tracks") the week of March 27, 1993, at number 74. The track proved to be a disappointment commercially, hitting only number 55 on the chart for the week of May 15, 1993, and spent 18 weeks in total on the chart.

== Music video ==
Twain in the video for "What Made You Say That".

Shania Twain's first music video was directed by Steven Goldmann. Mercury Records invested in an expensive music video shot at Miami Beach, Florida on January 12, 1993. It was released on February 20, 1993, to Country Music Television (CMT), where it was labeled as a "Hot Shot". The video is simple, featuring Twain dancing around on the beach with a male model portrayed as her love interest. It was included in Twain's video album The Platinum Collection (2001). It received a nomination at the 1993 CCMA Awards for CMT Video of the Year.

The video attracted controversy at the time of its release due to the showing of Twain's midriff, which she said in her autobiography that she was inspired by Cindy Crawford and Madonna. At the time of release for the video for "What Made You Say That," women in country music were expected to cover up. According to music critic Roy Shuker, the video was a celebration of her sex appeal. Robin Eggar of the book Shania Twain: The Biography described the video as proof to Twain that "being young, sassy, and sexy worked, that she did not have to conform to Nashville's ideas of the correct feminine image." Despite that, CMT banned the video claiming it was too suggestive, although they would later retract the ban and let the video play again on the network.

The video's screening on CMT Europe, where it was so popular that for multiple weeks it was the most played video on the network, caught the attention of rock producer Robert John "Mutt" Lange. He noticed her beauty and singing ability and had wanted to meet her. According to Twain, she did not know who Mutt Lange was at the time. The two began talking on the phone and would later meet at the Nashville Fun Fair in June 1993 before they would marry later that December. This would be the start of a over-decade long collaboration between the two that would make the most commercially successful material of Twain's career.

== Track listings ==
- US jukebox single
1. "What Made You Say That" – 2:59
2. "Crime of the Century" – 3:29
- US cassette single
1. "What Made You Say That" – 2:59
2. "You Lay a Whole Lot of Love on Me" – 2:48

== Charts ==
Weekly chart performance for "What Made You Say That"
Chart (1993)	Peak position
Canada Country Singles (RPM)	70
US Hot Country Songs (Billboard)	55
US Country Top 50 (Radio & Records)	43
US Country (Gavin Report)	40
US Top 100 Country Singles (Cashbox)	40
