= Shania Twain (album) =

- Original album cover; 2000 reissue uses an alternate cover

Studio album by Shania Twain
- Released: April 20, 1993
- Recorded: 1992–1993
- Studio: Music Mill (Nashville, Tennessee)
- Genre: Country
- Length: 30:41
- Label: Polygram; Mercury
- Producer: Harold Shedd; Norro Wilson

Shania Twain chronology
Shania Twain (1993)	The Woman in Me (1995)

Singles from Shania Twain
- 1. "What Made You Say That" Released: March 6, 1993; 2. "Dance with the One That Brought You" Released: July 13, 1993; 3. "You Lay a Whole Lot of Love on Me" Released: September 7, 1993

Shania Twain is the debut studio album by Canadian singer Shania Twain, released on April 20, 1993, by Polygram and Mercury Records. After assembling a demo tape to send to labels, Mercury Nashville took an interest and signed her a contract. Unlike her later releases in which she had a major role in writing, Twain has writing credits on only one song from the album.

The album was not commercially successful upon its original release, only reaching number 67 on the US Country Albums chart. Three singles were released from the album, none of which cracked the top 40 at country radio. The album received renewed attention following the massive success of Twain's subsequent albums and was certified Platinum by the RIAA in 1999. Shania Twain was rereleased in 2000.

Twain performed the album's first single, "What Made You Say That" during her Come on Over Tour in 1999, but has not performed any of the album's songs since. No selections from Shania Twain were included on her 2004 Greatest Hits album. "What Made You Say That" is included on her Netflix documentary companion compilation album Not Just a Girl (The Highlights) (2022).

== Content ==
Five songs were originally recorded by other artists. "There Goes the Neighborhood" was recorded by Joe Diffie in 1990, "When He Leaves You" was a single for Donna Meade in 1989, "You Lay a Whole Lot of Love on Me" was recorded by Con Hunley in 1980 and Tom Jones in 1983, "Still Under the Weather" was recorded by Andy Williams in 1990, and "What Made You Say That" was recorded by Wayne Massey in 1989. In her 2011 autobiography, From This Moment On, Twain expressed displeasure with her debut studio album, revealing that she had very little creative control and was frustrated with being unable to showcase her songwriting abilities. However, she did co-write one song on the album titled "God Ain't Gonna Getcha for That".

== Singles ==
"What Made You Say That" was released on March 6, 1993 as the lead single from the album and Twain's debut single. The song peaked at number 55 on the Billboard Hot Country Singles & Tracks and number 78 on the RPM Canadian Country Tracks chart. The song received attention due to its music video, which prominently showed her midriff. The music video was banned by CMT with the network claiming it was too suggestive, though this was later retracted.

"Dance with the One That Brought You" was released as the second single from the album on July 13, 1993. It reached the peak position of number 55 on the Hot Country Singles & Tracks and in Canada, it reached number 70 on the RPM Canadian Country Tracks chart. Its music video received attention for its high-profile director and guest actor; actor Sean Penn filmed the music video while Charles Durning made an appearance.

"You Lay a Whole Lot of Love on Me" was sent to country radio on September 7, 1993 as the third and final single from Shania Twain. The song failed to enter the country charts in either the US or Canada. A music video was released for the song. The song was later released in 1994 in Europe as the only single from the Shania Twain album.

== Critical reception ==
Professional ratings
Review scores
Source	Rating
AllMusic	3/5 stars
Christgau's Consumer Guide	(choice cut)
Music Week	3/5 stars
Rolling Stone	3/5 stars
The Rolling Stone Album Guide	1/5 stars

Shania Twain received favorable reviews from critics. Rolling Stone gave the album a positive review, noting that although she had a long way to go, "attention must be paid". On the other end, Thom Owens of AllMusic gave the album a mixed but mostly negative review, calling it a bland album that even Twain's vocals are "too showy to make any of these mediocre songs stick."

== Track listing ==
No.	Title	Writer(s)	Length
1.	"What Made You Say That"	Tony Haselden; Stan Munsey	2:58
2.	"You Lay a Whole Lot of Love on Me"	Hank Beach; Forest Borders II	2:48
3.	"Dance with the One That Brought You"	Sam Hogin; Gretchen Peters	2:23
4.	"Still Under the Weather"	Skip Ewing; L.E. White; Michael White	3:06
5.	"God Ain't Gonna Getcha for That"	Eilleen Twain; Kent Robbins	2:44
6.	"Got a Hold on Me"	Rachel Newman	2:14
7.	"There Goes the Neighborhood"	Tommy Dodson; Bill C. Graham; Alan Laney	3:17
8.	"Forget Me"	Stephony Smith	3:21
9.	"When He Leaves You"	Mike Reid; Kent Robbins	4:21
10.	"Crime of the Century"	Richard Fagan; Ralph Murphy	3:29
Total length:			30:41

== Personnel ==
- Shania Twain - lead vocals
- Paul Leim, Larrie Londin - drums
- Terry McMillan - percussion
- Mike Brignardello, Glenn Worf - bass
- Mark Casstevens, Allen Frank Estes, Chris Leuzinger, Billy Joe Walker Jr., John Willis - acoustic guitar
- Steve Gibson, Billy Joe Walker Jr., Reggie Young - electric guitar
- Sonny Garrish - steel guitar
- Costo Davis - synthesizer
- David Briggs, Costo Davis, Gary Prim - keyboards
- Terry McMillan, Kirk "Jelly Roll" Johnson - harmonica
- Anthony Martin, John Wesley Ryles, Ronny Scaife, Shania Twain, Cindy Richardson Walker, Dennis Wilson, Curtis Young - backing vocals

Technical

- Produced by Norro Wilson and Harold Shedd
- Engineered and mixed by Jim Cotton, Todd Culross, Graeme Smith and Joe Scaife
- Mastered by Hank Williams

== Charts ==
=== Weekly charts ===
Chart (1993–2000)	Peak position
Canadian Country Albums (RPM)	28
Norwegian Albums (VG-lista)	40
Scottish Albums (OCC)	64
UK Albums (OCC)	113
UK Country Albums (OCC)	3
US Top Country Albums (Billboard)	67
US Top Catalog Albums (Billboard)	35

=== Year-end charts ===
Chart (2001)	Position
Canadian Country Albums (Nielsen SoundScan)	53

Chart (2002)	Position
Canadian Country Albums (Nielsen SoundScan)	60

== Certifications ==
Region	Certification	Certified units/sales
Canada (Music Canada)	2× Platinum	200,000^{^}
United Kingdom (BPI)	Silver	85,692
United States (RIAA)	Platinum	1,000,000^{^}
^{^} Shipments figures based on certification alone.

== Release history ==
Region	Date	Format	Label
US, Canada	April 20, 1993	CD, cassette	Mercury Nashville
UK, Europe	May 2000	CD	Mercury Nashville
US	October 14, 2016	LP vinyl	Mercury Nashville
