= Con Hunley =

American country music singer (born 1945)

- Born: Conard Logan Hunley; April 9, 1945 (age 81)
- Origin: Knoxville, Tennessee, U.S.
- Genres: Country
- Occupations: Singer, songwriter, musician
- Instruments: Vocals, piano
- Years active: 1976–present
- Labels: Prairie; Warner Bros.; MCA; Capitol; IMMI
- Website: conhunley.com

Conard Logan Hunley (born April 9, 1945) is an American country music singer.

== Life and career ==
Hunley was born in Knoxville, Tennessee, United States. After graduating from Central High School in Knoxville, Hunley began playing with local bands, maturing musically and gaining his first fans. Hunley joined the Air Force in 1965, and spent most of his service on a military base in Illinois, teaching aircraft mechanics. He played music in area clubs whenever possible.

After his tour of duty was finished Hunley returned to Knoxville and began performing weekly at a local nightclub (a dive called, "The Corner Lounge"), where he met businessman Sam Kirkpatrick, who formed the independent label Prairie Dust Records to showcase Hunley's talents. After some minor success on the country music chart, Hunley caught the attention of Warner Bros. Records, who signed him in 1978. Hunley recorded five albums with Warner Bros., released several singles on MCA Records and Capitol Records, and achieved more than 20 charted hits, including "Weekend Friend", "No Relief In Sight", and "Oh Girl". He toured throughout the U.S., playing large venues around the country with other musical acts, including Alabama, the Oak Ridge Boys, Larry Gatlin, George Jones and Tammy Wynette. In 1986 Hunley had his final chart appearance with "Quittin' Time".

Hunley recorded no new music for over a decade after his last release for Capitol Records. Hunley's long recording hiatus ended after signing with IMMI Records in 2004. He teamed again producer Norro Wilson, the architect of several of his early Warner Brothers hits, and added his first new recorded product in twenty years, Sweet Memories, to his catalog. The album was selected by CMT.com as one of the top 10 albums of 2004.

In early 2006, IMMI Records released Shoot from the Heart, another collaboration by Hunley and Norro Wilson. Hunley co-wrote two of the songs with songwriters Kim Williams and Larry Shell.

Hunley participates in celebrity golf tournaments around the country, and hosts one of his own each year in his hometown of Knoxville, Tennessee, which has raised over a million dollars for charities benefiting underprivileged children.

== Discography ==
=== Albums ===
Year	Album	US Country	Label
1979	No Limit	34	Warner Bros.
1980	I Don't Want to Lose You	29	Warner Bros.
1980	Don't It Break Your Heart	51	Warner Bros.
1981	Ask Any Woman	59	Warner Bros.
1982	Oh Girl	56	Warner Bros.
2004	Sweet Memories	—	IMMI
2005	The First Time: From Studio B	—	IMMI
2006	Shoot from the Heart	—	IMMI
2011	Lost and Found: The MCA/Capitol Years	—	IMMI

=== Singles ===
Year	Single	Chart Positions		Album
Year	Single	US Country	CAN Country	Album
1976	"Misery Loves Company"	—	—	Singles only
1976	"Loving You Is a Habit I Can't Break"	—	—	Singles only
1977	"Pick Up the Pieces"	96	—	Singles only
1977	"I'll Always Remember That Song"	75	—	Singles only
1977	"Breaking Up Is Hard to Do"	67	—	Singles only
1978	"Cry Cry Darling"	34	33	Singles only
1978	"Week-End Friend"	13	28	No Limit
1978	"You've Still Got a Place in My Heart"	14	20	No Limit
1979	"I've Been Waiting for You All of My Life"	14	16	No Limit
1979	"Since I Fell for You"	20	42	No Limit
1979	"I Don't Want to Lose You"	20	—	I Don't Want to Lose You
1980	"You Lay a Whole Lot of Love on Me"	19	19	I Don't Want to Lose You
1980	"They Never Lost You"	19	—	Don't It Break Your Heart
1980	"What's New with You"	11	—	Don't It Break Your Heart
1981	"She's Steppin' Out"	17	—	Ask Any Woman
1982	"No Relief in Sight"	20	44	Ask Any Woman
1982	"Oh Girl"	12	26	Oh Girl
1982	"Confidential"	43	—	Oh Girl
1983	"Once You Get the Feel of It"	42	—	Singles only
1983	"Satisfied Mind"	84	—	Singles only
1984	"Deep in the Arms of Texas"	75	—	Singles only
1984	"All American Country Boy"	57	—	Singles only
1985	"I'd Rather Be Crazy"	54	—	Singles only
1985	"Nobody Ever Gets Enough Love"	49	—	Singles only
1985	"What Am I Gonna Do About You"	48	—	Singles only
1986	"Blue Suede Blues"	49	—	Singles only
1986	"Quittin' Time"	55	—	Singles only
2004	"Still"	—	—	Sweet Memories
2005	"Only Time Will Tell"	—	—	Sweet Memories
2005	"She Ain't You"	—	—	Sweet Memories
2005	"Sweet Memories"	—	—	Sweet Memories
2006	"I Can't Make It Alone"	—	—	Shoot from the Heart
2006	"That Old Clock (Just Keeps on Tickin')"	—	—	Shoot from the Heart
2006	"I Can See You With My Eyes Closed"	—	—	Shoot from the Heart
2007	"Hollow Man"	—	—	Shoot from the Heart
2007	"The Keys"	—	—	Shoot from the Heart
2010	"Victims of the System"	—	—	Single only
