= Dirty Rosie =

2026 single by Shania Twain

Single by Shania Twain

from the album Little Miss Twain
- Released: May 13, 2026
- Genre: Southern rock
- Length: 2:46
- Label: Republic
- Songwriter: Shania Twain
- Producer: Zach Dawes

Shania Twain singles chronology
"Da Stanotte in Poi (From This Moment On)" (2024)	"Dirty Rosie" (2026)

Music video
- "Dirty Rosie" on YouTube

"Dirty Rosie" is a song by Canadian singer-songwriter Shania Twain. It was produced by Zach Dawes and released on May 13, 2026, by Republic Records as the lead single from her seventh studio album Little Miss Twain (2026). It was written solely by Twain and is named after her first truck, with the lyrics detailing her first experiences of driving as a child in Ontario and how, while her lover may drive her crazy, he is not allowed to drive her truck.

== Background ==
"Dirty Rosie" was released on May 13, 2026 alongside the announcement of her seventh album, Little Miss Twain. When the official track listing was revealed, "Dirty Rosie" was shown to feature as the album's fourth track.

== Writing and composition ==
The song is named after her old truck, with Twain explaining, "this is a reflection on my first years driving, like behind the wheel. I was 10 and we drove the dirt roads because we're working in the woods. We did a lot of lumberjack kind of work, OK? Dirty trucks were the only kind of trucks we had and they were always old and rickety and we could not afford new ones and nobody shines their truck. I remember my dad's truck, it was a red truck, but it faded, of course, to a rosie colour. I thought, the only kind of truck that I've ever driven was a Dirty Rosie truck. Yeah, it's all about my first days as a child driver."

Sonically, "Dirty Rosie" was described as "genre-blurring" and "blending country with rock, pop, soul and bluegrass textures" which "echoes the boundary-pushing spirit" that defines Twain's career.

== Live performances ==
Twain debuted the song at an intimate 200-capacity show at the Shacklewell Arms pub in Dalston, England on June 7, 2026. She told the crowd: "I only got signed in Nashville, Tennessee, when I was in my late twenties, so this was a long buildup. I promise you, I was playing these very same kind of bars all those years from the age of eight years old to my late twenties, and little Miss Twain was trying to become a recording artist. The rest of the story is on the album; you’ll have to listen to the album." It later featured as part of her set during her twelve dates supporting Harry Styles at Wembley Stadium for the London leg of his Together, Together Tour.

== Music video ==
A lyric video for the song was released simultaneously with the track itself. It features footage of a red truck driving along country roads against a backdrop of trees and mountains alongside clips of Twain posing in and against it.

== Personnel ==
Credits adapted from Tidal.

- Drury Anderson - mandolin, backing vocals
- Jay Bellerose - drums, percussion
- Gregg Bissonette - drums, percussion
- Luke Black - banjo, acoustic guitar, backing vocals
- Tommy Brenneck - electric guitar, organ
- Jon Brion - electric guitar
- T Bone Burnett - electric guitar
- Matt Colton - engineering
- Zach Dawes - production
- Nathan East - bass
- Rich Evatt - engineering
- Alex Ghenea - engineering
- John Hanes - engineering
- Aaron Janik - horn
- Eja Lange - backing vocals
- Josiah Nelson - fiddle, backing vocals
- Ray Parker Jr. - acoustic guitar
- Kenneth Pattengale - acoustic guitar
- David Piach - organ, piano, backing vocals
- Shania Twain - vocals, banjo
- Michael Shuman - programming
- Freddie Washington - bass, backing vocals
- Sam Wilson - backing vocals

== Charts ==
Weekly chart performance for "Dirty Rosie"
Chart (2026)	Peak position
Canada Country (Billboard)	57
UK Country Airplay (Radiomonitor)	6
