= Dance with the One That Brought You =

Single by Shania Twain

from the album Shania Twain
- B-side: "When He Leaves You"
- Released: July 13, 1993
- Recorded: 1992
- Studio: Music Mill (Nashville, TN)
- Genre: Country
- Length: 2:23
- Label: Polygram; Mercury Nashville
- Songwriters: Sam Hogin; Gretchen Peters
- Producers: Harold Shedd; Norro Wilson

Shania Twain singles chronology
"What Made You Say That" (1993)	"Dance with the One That Brought You" (1993)	"You Lay a Whole Lot of Love on Me" (1993)

Music video
- "Shania Twain - Dance With The One That Brought You (Official Music Video)" on YouTube

"Dance with the One That Brought You" is a song by Shania Twain, released as the second single from her debut studio album Shania Twain. The song was written by Sam Hogin and Gretchen Peters. The single was released to radio in July 1993. The song proved to have the same success as its predecessor at country radio, as they both peaked at number 55. The video also gained attention because of its high profile director and guest actor.

== Music video ==
The music video for "Dance with the One That Brought You" was shot in Los Angeles and directed by actor Sean Penn. It was filmed on May 2, 1993 and released on May 24, 1993. The video is set in a country bar in two time frames, the present and roughly 40 years prior. The earlier shows Twain and her husband (played by Scott Plank) going to the bar to dance, yet she ends up sitting alone at a table while he is off dancing with other people. In the present time, Twain is shown singing at the bar while the couple are now much older. Charles Durning plays the husband, who just like 40 years prior left his wife, played by Lois Kaplan, to dance with other people. Sean Penn and his group found Lois when she was dancing at In Cahoots (in Glendale, CA). The "present" scenes are in colour while the older scenes are in black and white. At the end of the video, the man (in both flashback and present day) goes up to his wife and asks her to dance. The video is available on Twain's DVD The Platinum Collection.

== Chart performance ==
"Dance with the One That Brought You" debuted on the Billboard Hot Country Singles & Tracks chart the week of July 3, 1993 at number 70, four spots higher than the previous single, "What Made You Say That". It spent 11 weeks on the chart and climbed to a peak position of number 55 on August 21, 1993, where it remained for one week.

In Canada the song debuted on the RPM Country Singles chart on July 17, 1993 at number 94.

Chart (1993)	Peak position
Canada Country Singles (RPM)	77
US Hot Country Songs (Billboard)	55

== Releases ==
- US 7" single (1993) Mercury 862-346
1. "Dance With the One That Brought You"
2. "When He Leaves You"
- US Cassette single (1993) Mercury 862 346-4

Side 1

1. "Dance With the One That Brought You"

Side 2

1. "When He Leaves You"
