= You Lay a Whole Lot of Love on Me =

- US cassette single cover

Single by Shania Twain

from the album Shania Twain
- B-side: "God Ain't Gonna Getcha for That"
- Released: September 7, 1993
- Recorded: 1992
- Studio: Music Mill (Nashville, TN)
- Genre: Country
- Length: 2:48
- Label: Polygram; Mercury Nashville
- Songwriter(s): Hank Beach; Forest Borders II
- Producer(s): Harold Shedd; Norro Wilson

Shania Twain singles chronology
"Dance with the One That Brought You" (1993)	"You Lay a Whole Lot of Love on Me" (1993)	"Whose Bed Have Your Boots Been Under?" (1995)

Music video
- "Shania Twain - You Lay A Whole Lot Of Love On Me (Official Music Video)" on YouTube

"You Lay a Whole Lot of Love on Me" is a song written by Hank Beach and Forest Borders II. It has been recorded by Con Hunley, Tom Jones, Arne Benoni and Shania Twain.

Con Hunley's version was on his 1980 release, I Don't Want to Lose You. "You Lay a Whole Lot of Love on Me" was the album's second single, and reached No. 19 on Billboard's Hot Country Singles chart. Tom Jones's version was on his 1983 album, Don't Let Our Dreams Die Young. Arne Benoni's version was on his album As for You, released 1991.

== Shania Twain version ==
Canadian country music artist Shania Twain included a cover version on her self-titled debut album (1993). Her version was produced by Harold Shedd and Norro Wilson. "You Lay a Whole Lot of Love on Me" was the album's third and final single on September 7, 1993. The song failed to enter any chart, despite a music video being made. It was later released in 1994 as the only single from the Shania Twain album in Europe.

=== Critical reception ===
Brad Hogue of Cashbox gave the single a positive review, calling it Twain's most impressive single at the time of its release. An uncredited review from Gavin Report also gave a positive review, calling it very familiar and instantly familiar.

=== Track listing ===
US single & Europe CD single

1. "You Lay a Whole Lot of Love On Me"
2. "God Ain't Gonna Getcha for That"

Europe maxi-CD single

1. "You Lay a Whole Lot of Love On Me"
2. "God Ain't Gonna Getcha for That"
3. "Dance with the One That Brought You"

=== Music video ===
The music video for "You Lay a Whole Lot of Love on Me" was directed by Steven Goldmann and filmed in Montreal, Canada in August 1993. The video premiered to Country Music Television on September 8, 1993. The video features Twain performing on a large staircase, intercut with scenes of her and her love interest in various parts of Montreal. The video is available on Twain's DVD The Platinum Collection.
