= Any Man of Mine =

- UK CD single cover

Single by Shania Twain

from the album The Woman in Me
- A-side: "Whose Bed Have Your Boots Been Under"
- B-side: "Raining on Our Love"; "God Ain't Gonna Getcha for That"; "Still Under the Weather"
- Released: May 8, 1995
- Recorded: 1994
- Studio: A.R.P. Track Productions (Sainte-Anne-des-Lacs, Quebec, Canada); Sound Stage Recording Studios (Nashville, TN)
- Genre: Country pop; country rock
- Length: 4:06
- Label: PolyGram; Mercury Nashville
- Songwriters: Robert John "Mutt" Lange; Shania Twain
- Producer: Robert John "Mutt" Lange

Shania Twain singles chronology
"Whose Bed Have Your Boots Been Under?" (1995)	"Any Man of Mine" (1995)	"The Woman in Me (Needs the Man in You)" (1995)

Music video
- "Any Man Of Mine" on YouTube

"Any Man of Mine" is a song co-written and recorded by Canadian country music singer Shania Twain. It was issued to US radio on May 8, 1995, as the second single from her second studio album The Woman in Me (1995). Twain wrote the song with Robert John "Mutt" Lange, who also produced it. The song became Twain's first number one hit at country radio, and it peaked within the top 40 of the Billboard Hot 100.

Though "Whose Bed Have Your Boots Been Under" was issued to US radio in January 1995 and "Any Man of Mine" being issued to radio in May 1995, Twain's label released her first two singles as double A-side single commercially in the US in June 1995. In August 1995, the single was certified Gold for 500,000 sales. "Any Man of Mine" was released commercially as a stand-alone single internationally.

"Any Man of Mine" also proved to be a critical success; it was nominated for both Best Country Song and Best Female Country Vocal Performance at the 1996 Grammy Awards. It won Single of the Year at both the Canadian Country Music Awards and Country Music Radio Awards in 1995. It also won Country Single of the Year at the 1996 Jukebox Awards and Song of the Year at the 1996 RPM Big Country Music Awards.

== Critical reception ==
Larry Flick of Billboard wrote, "Twain aims right for the dance clubs with this hi-tech hoedown. The lyrics are dancefloor dumb, but the song is undeniably catchy. Besides, any song that borrows a vocal hook from the Three Stooges can't be all bad." British magazine Music Week gave the song five out of five, commenting, "Another Canadian singer breaking national borders and stylistic barriers. This debut single from the new album features hubby Mutt Lange's crunching but considered rock production (and vocals) plus enough country to catch the ear." The magazine's Alan Jones noted that "it is a very powerful singalong style song, with heavy syncopated drums – a la We Will Rock You – and has been on heavy rotation for some time on Country 1035."

== Music video ==
The music video for "Any Man of Mine" was shot in Santa Ynez, California, and directed by John Derek and Charley Randazzo. The video showcases Twain's famed midriff, while she dances around in jeans and a jean-vest. The country theme of the video is prominent, filmed at a ranch, with Twain being around a horse, and driving a truck pulling a horse trailer. "Any Man of Mine" won the Canadian Country Music Award for Video of the Year, AOL's Online Music Award for Hottest Country Video and CMT Europe's Video of the Year. Two videos were made, one with the Video Version, which extends the ending of the Album Version very slightly, and one with the Alternate Mix, which removes the steel guitar present in the other version. The Video Version is available on Twain's DVD The Platinum Collection.

On YouTube, as of May 2023, "Any Man of Mine" is Twain's fourth most-viewed video with 176 million views, behind "You're Still the One" with 230 million, "From This Moment On" with 298 million views, and "Man! I Feel Like a Woman!" with 356 million.

== Chart performance ==
"Any Man of Mine" debuted at number 66 on the US Billboard Hot Country Singles & Tracks chart the week of May 13, 1995. At that time, it was her highest debut, a record previously held by "Dance with the One That Brought You". It spent 20 weeks on the chart and peaked at number one on July 22, 1995, where it remained for two weeks. The song became Twain's first number one single and her first Top 10 single. The song was also the first number one on the Billboard country chart to be performed by a non-American since fellow Canadian Anne Murray hit number one with "Now and Forever (You and Me)" on April 26, 1986. The single also spent ten weeks atop Billboard's Country Singles Sales chart. "Any Man of Mine" reached a peak of number 31 on the Billboard Hot 100, becoming her first single on that chart; the song reached number 13 in sales.

== Official versions ==
- Album Version (4:07)
- Video Version (4:15)
- Alternate Mix (4:15)^{1}
- Acapella (3:55)

^{1}The Alternate Mix sees the removal of the Steel Guitar. This version was originally issued on the international pressings of the CD single but was not credited in the liner notes.

== Track listings ==
UK CD single

1. "Any Man of Mine" — 4:06
2. "Raining on Our Love" — 4:38
3. "God Ain't Gonna Getcha for That" — 2:44
4. "Still Under the Weather" — 3:06

Europe CD single

1. "Any Man of Mine" — 4:06
2. "Still Under the Weather" — 3:06

== Parodies ==
In 1995, disc jockey Gino Ruberto, then working at KEEY-FM in Minneapolis, Minnesota, recorded a parody called "Any Gal of Mine" under the pseudonym Gino the New Guy. This parody charted for twelve weeks on the Billboard Hot Country Singles Tracks chart, peaking at number 56 despite not being distributed by a record label. Country music parodist Cledus T. Judd released a parody entitled "If Shania Was Mine" from his 1996 album I Stoled This Record.

== Charts ==
=== Weekly charts ===
Weekly chart performance of "Any Man of Mine"
Chart (1995)	Peak position
Canada Country Singles (RPM)	1
UK Singles Chart	118
US Billboard Hot 100	31
US Hot Country Songs (Billboard)	1

=== Year-end charts ===
Chart (1995)	Position
Canada Country Tracks (RPM)	4
US Country Songs (Billboard)	2

== Certifications ==
Region	Certification	Certified units/sales
Canada (Music Canada)	5× Platinum	400,000^{‡}
New Zealand (RMNZ)	Platinum	30,000^{‡}
United Kingdom (BPI)	Silver	200,000^{‡}
United States (RIAA)	2× Platinum	2,000,000^{‡}
^{‡} Sales+streaming figures based on certification alone.

== Release history ==
Release dates and format(s) for "Any Man of Mine"
Region	Date	Format(s)	Label(s)	Ref.
United States	May 8, 1995	Country radio	Mercury Nashville	
United Kingdom	July 24, 1995	CD single	Mercury	
