= That Don't Impress Me Much =

1998 single by Shania Twain

Single by Shania Twain

from the album Come On Over
- Released: December 7, 1998
- Studio: Masterfonics (Nashville, Tennessee)
- Genre: Country pop; dance-pop; pop rock
- Length: 3:38 (original album version); 3:59 (dance mix edit)
- Label: Mercury
- Songwriters: Shania Twain; Robert John "Mutt" Lange
- Producer: Robert John "Mutt" Lange

Shania Twain singles chronology
"Honey, I'm Home" (1998)	"That Don't Impress Me Much" (1998)	"Man! I Feel Like a Woman!" (1999)

Music video
- "That Don't Impress Me Much" on YouTube

"That Don't Impress Me Much" is a song co-written and recorded by Canadian singer Shania Twain. It was released in December 1998 as the sixth country single, and seventh single overall, from her third studio album, Come On Over (1997). It was third to pop and fourth to international markets. The song was written by Robert John "Mutt" Lange and Twain, and was originally released to North American country radio stations in late 1998. It became her third biggest single on the Billboard Hot 100 and remains one of Twain's biggest hits worldwide.

"That Don't Impress Me Much" has appeared in all of Twain's tours (Come On Over, Up!, Rock This Country, Now and Queen of Me). The country version was performed on the Come on Over Tour and the dance version on the rest of her tours. "That Don't Impress Me Much" was named Foreign Hit of the Year at the 2000 Danish Grammy Awards. A dance-pop remix of the song was used as the official song of the 2003 CONCACAF Gold Cup.

== Background ==
Twain wrote the song on or near Christmas Day. In 2017, during a listening party for her fifth studio album Now, Twain revealed the reason behind using Brad Pitt's name instead of other suitable male celebrities saying that after she heard about the scandal between Pitt and Gwyneth Paltrow and the subsequent leaking of Pitt's naked photo in Playgirl magazine, she was left unimpressed by all the fuss as she found it was normal to see naked people.

== Content ==
The song describes three self-absorbed suitors with whom Twain, as the title implies, is not impressed: a know-it-all ("Okay, so you're a rocket scientist"), a man obsessed with his looks ("Okay, so you're Brad Pitt"), and another obsessed with his car ("Okay, so you've got a car"). Twain states that brains, looks, and the car "won't keep [her] warm in the middle of the night" and seeks a man with "the touch" that can do so.

== Critical reception ==
After the single's 1998 country release, Billboard magazine wrote that "it doesn't sound remotely country" and criticized the simplistic lyrics, but praised the melody's "quirky appeal, Twain's delivery," and Robert John "Mutt" Lange's "skillful production." After the single's 1999 pop release, in a separate review, the magazine said that the single "could possibly solidify Twain's status as the decade's crossover queen," though they criticized Lange's use of "dated-sounding instrumental elements to 'pop' it up." Leeann Ward of Country Universe rated the track a B, saying "Along with the straight talk, we also hear traces of amusement throughout the song, which is one of the signature endearing qualities of Twain’s music."

== Music video ==
The music video for "That Don't Impress Me Much" was shot in the Mojave Desert at El Mirage Dry Lake and Barstow, California. It was directed by Paul Boyd and shot on November 3 and 4, 1998; it was released on December 2, 1998, on CMT. It depicts Twain hitchhiking in the middle of the desert, in a hooded leopard skin outfit designed by Marc Bouwer (though in some scenes the hooded outfit is open, showing a matching bra) and matching stiletto-heeled boots, and being approached by several men offering her a ride out of the desert. These include a man in a 1957 Chevy Bel Air, on a motorcycle, in an army jeep, a tanker truck, and on a Friesian horse. One of the men was played by male model John Devoe, who previously appeared in Twain's "You're Still the One" video.

The video won the Video of the Year award at the Canadian Country Music Awards and the MuchMoreMusic Award at the 1999 MuchMusic Video Awards. Two versions of the video were made, one with the 'Original Album Version', released to country channels, and the 'Dance Mix Edit' released to pop stations. The 'Original Album Version' of the video is available on Twain's compilations Come On Over: Video Collection (1999) and The Platinum Collection (2001). It ranked number 77 on VH1's 100 Greatest Videos in Rock and Roll in 2001 and number 45 on CMT's 100 Greatest Videos in Country Music in 2004, making it the only video to make both lists. It was also named country music's sexiest video in 2006 by CMT Canada. Twain wore a similar leopard skin outfit in a 2020 video for her Orville Peck duet "Legends Never Die".

== Chart performance ==
"That Don't Impress Me Much" debuted at number 60 on the Billboard Hot Country Singles & Tracks chart the week of December 12, 1998, the highest debut of the week. The single spent 20 weeks on the chart and climbed to a peak position of number eight on February 27, 1999, where it remained for one week. The single became Twain's tenth Top 10 (sixth consecutive), and her 12th Top 20 single on the country charts. "That Don't Impress Me Much" also topped the Country Singles Sales chart for five weeks.

At adult contemporary radio, "That Don't Impress Me Much" debuted at number 22 the week of April 17, 1999, the week's highest debut, as well as Twain's highest debut of all time on the AC chart. The single spent 26 weeks on the chart and quickly climbed to a peak position of number eight on June 5, 1999, where it remained for one week. "That Don't Impress Me Much" became Twain's third consecutive Top 10 single on that chart.

"That Don't Impress Me Much" was also Twain's third-most successful single on the Billboard Hot 100, after "You're Still the One" and "From This Moment On", which peaked at number two and number four, respectively. The song debuted at number 80 on January 23, 1999. It spent 28 weeks on the chart and peaked at number seven for two weeks starting June 12, 1999, becoming Twain's third and last top 10 hit. It also reached number five in airplay and number 11 in sales.

Internationally, "That Don't Impress Me Much" became Twain's biggest single in the United Kingdom. It debuted, at its peak, on May 22, 1999, at number three, where it remained for three weeks, and remained in the Top 10 for another seven weeks. It remained on the entire chart for 21 weeks. "That Don't Impress Me Much" became Twain's third (second consecutive) Top 10 in the United Kingdom and the best selling non-number one single of the year in the country. Elsewhere, the song hit number one in Belgium, Ireland, Norway and New Zealand, where it debuted at number one and was later certified gold.

In all, "That Don't Impress Me Much" hit the Top 10 in 16 different countries: Australia, Austria, Belgium, Canada, Finland, Germany, Hungary, Ireland, Latvia, Netherlands, New Zealand, Norway, Scotland, Sweden, Switzerland, the United Kingdom, and the United States. In Australia, the song debuted at number five, reaching number two during its third week in, and stayed there for seven weeks as Britney Spears' single "...Baby One More Time" was keeping its top position. The single stayed on the Top 100 for 23 weeks and was Australia's the eighth-highest-selling single of 1999.

== Track listings ==
- US CD and cassette single
1. "That Don't Impress Me Much" (Remix #1) – 3:59
2. "That Don't Impress Me Much" (Remix #2) – 3:40
- Australasian CD single
1. "That Don't Impress Me Much" (dance mix) – 4:43
2. "From This Moment On" (Tempo mix) – 4:03
3. "From This Moment On" (dance mix) – 6:22
4. "Honey, I'm Home" (live/direct TV mix) – 3:46
- Australasian maxi-CD single
1. "That Don't Impress Me Much" (dance mix) – 4:43
2. "(If You're Not in It for Love) I'm Outta Here!" (live/direct TV mix) – 7:03
3. Medley: "Home Ain't Where His Heart Is (Anymore)" / "The Woman in Me" / "You've Got a Way" (live/direct TV mix) – 7:25
4. "Love Gets Me Every Time" (dance mix) – 4:42
5. "Don't Be Stupid (You Know I Love You)" (extended dance mix) – 4:44
- European CD single and UK cassette single
1. "That Don't Impress Me Much" (dance mix edit) – 3:59
2. "From This Moment On" (Tempo mix) – 4:03
- European maxi-CD single
1. "That Don't Impress Me Much" (dance mix edit) – 3:59
2. "From This Moment On" (Tempo mix) – 4:03
3. "From This Moment On" (dance mix) – 6:22
4. "Honey, I'm Home" (live/direct TV mix) – 3:46
- UK CD1
1. "That Don't Impress Me Much" (dance mix edit) – 3:59
2. "From This Moment On" (Tempo mix) – 4:03
3. "From This Moment On" (solo vocal/remix) – 3:46
- UK CD2
1. "That Don't Impress Me Much" – 3:38
2. "You're Still the One" – 3:34
3. Medley: "Home Ain't Where His Heart Is (Anymore)" / "The Woman in Me" / "You've Got a Way" (live/direct TV mix) – 7:25
4. "That Don't Impress Me Much" (video)
- French CD single
1. "That Don't Impress Me Much" (dance mix edit) – 3:59
2. "Man! I Feel Like a Woman!" – 3:53

== Credits and personnel ==
Credits are taken from the Come On Over album booklet.

Studio

- Recorded and mastered at Masterfonics (Nashville, Tennessee)

Personnel

- Shania Twain – writing, vocals, background vocals
- Robert John "Mutt" Lange – writing, background vocals, production
- Biff Watson – guitars
- Dann Huff – guitars, guitar textures, six-string bass, talk box
- Brent Mason – electric guitar and solo
- Paul Franklin – pedal steel guitar
- Joe Chemay – electric and fretless bass
- Paul Leim – drums
- Mike Shipley – mixing
- Olle Romo – programming, Pro Tools, sequencing, editing
- Glenn Meadows – mastering

== Charts ==
=== Weekly charts ===
Chart (1998–2000)	Peak position
Australia (ARIA)	2
Austria (Ö3 Austria Top 40)	3
Belgium (Ultratop 50 Flanders)	1
Belgium (Ultratop 50 Wallonia)	13
Canada Top Singles (RPM)	5
Canada Adult Contemporary (RPM)	6
Canada Country Singles (RPM)	2
Canada (Canadian Singles Chart)	8
Canada (BDS Airplay Top 40)	2
Czech Republic (IFPI)	11
Denmark (Tracklisten)	4
Europe (Eurochart Hot 100)	5
Finland (Suomen virallinen lista)	3
France (SNEP)	12
Germany (GfK)	8
Hungary (Mahasz)	10
Iceland (Íslenski Listinn Topp 40)	31
Ireland (IRMA)	1
Italy (FIMI)	11
Netherlands (Dutch Top 40)	2
Netherlands (Single Top 100)	2
New Zealand (Recorded Music NZ)	1
Norway (VG-lista)	1
Scottish Singles Sales (Official Charts)	1
Spain (Promusicae)	9
Sweden (Sverigetopplistan)	3
Switzerland (Schweizer Hitparade)	6
UK Singles (Official Charts)	3
US Billboard Hot 100	7
US Adult Contemporary (Billboard)	8
US Adult Pop Airplay (Billboard)	6
US Hot Country Songs (Billboard)	8
US Pop Airplay (Billboard)	5
US Top 40 Tracks (Billboard)	5
US Top Country Singles Sales (Billboard)	1
US Adult Contemporary (Radio & Records)	6
US CHR/Pop (Radio & Records)	4
US Country (Radio & Records)	10
US Hot AC (Radio & Records)	6

Chart (2026)	Peak position
Norway Airplay (IFPI Norge)	74

=== Year-end charts ===
Chart (1999)	Position
Australia (ARIA)	8
Austria (Ö3 Austria Top 40)	29
Belgium (Ultratop 50 Flanders)	14
Belgium (Ultratop 50 Wallonia)	49
Canada Top Singles (RPM)	24
Canada Adult Contemporary (RPM)	49
Canada Country Tracks (RPM)	27
Europe (Eurochart Hot 100)	29
Germany (Media Control)	34
Netherlands (Dutch Top 40)	13
Netherlands (Single Top 100)	25
New Zealand (RIANZ)	38
Romania (Romanian Top 100)	4
Sweden (Hitlistan)	15
Switzerland (Schweizer Hitparade)	30
UK Singles (OCC)	7
UK Airplay (Music Week)	8
US Billboard Hot 100	32
US Adult Contemporary (Billboard)	22
US Adult Top 40 (Billboard)	25
US Hot Country Songs (Billboard)	53
US Mainstream Top 40 (Billboard)	29
US Adult Contemporary (Radio & Records)	27
US CHR/Pop (Radio & Records)	25
US Country (Radio & Records)	49
US Hot AC (Radio & Records)	23

Chart (2000)	Position
France (SNEP)	41

=== Decade-end charts ===
Chart (1990–1999)	Position
Netherlands (Dutch Top 40)	115

== Certifications ==
Region	Certification	Certified units/sales
Australia (ARIA)	2× Platinum	140,000^{^}
Austria (IFPI Austria)	Gold	25,000^{*}
Belgium (BRMA)	Gold	25,000^{*}
Canada (Music Canada)	3× Platinum	240,000^{‡}
Denmark (IFPI Danmark)	Gold	45,000^{‡}
Germany (BVMI)	Gold	250,000^{^}
New Zealand (RMNZ)	2× Platinum	60,000^{‡}
Norway (IFPI Norway)	Gold	
Sweden (GLF)	Platinum	30,000^{^}
United Kingdom (BPI)	2× Platinum	1,200,000^{‡}
United States (RIAA)	Platinum	1,000,000^{‡}
^{*} Sales figures based on certification alone.^{^} Shipments figures based on certification alone.^{‡} Sales+streaming figures based on certification alone.

== Release history ==
Region	Date	Format(s)	Label(s)	Ref.
United States	December 7, 1998	Country radio	Mercury	
United States	February 23, 1999	Contemporary hit radio	Mercury	
United Kingdom	May 10, 1999	CD; cassette	Mercury	
