= Honey, I'm Home =

1998 single by Shania Twain

Single by Shania Twain

from the album Come On Over
- B-side: "From This Moment On"
- Released: August 10, 1998
- Studio: Masterfonics (Nashville, Tennessee)
- Genre: Country rock
- Length: 3:39
- Label: Mercury Nashville
- Songwriters: Robert John "Mutt" Lange; Shania Twain
- Producer: Robert John "Mutt" Lange

Shania Twain singles chronology
"When" (1998)	"Honey, I'm Home" (1998)	"That Don't Impress Me Much" (1998)

Live video
- "Honey, I'm Home" on YouTube

"Honey, I'm Home" is a song co-written and recorded by Canadian country music artist Shania Twain. It was released on August 10, 1998, as the sixth single from her third studio album Come On Over (1997). The song was written by Twain and her then-husband Robert John "Mutt" Lange, who also produced it. The song speaks of Twain coming home from a hard day and wanting her partner to do things to calm her down.

"Honey, I'm Home" was seen by some critics as having very little country influences, but nevertheless was a commercial success. The song became Twain's seventh and final number one hit on the Hot Country Singles & Tracks chart and became her eleventh number one (and fifth consecutive) on the Canadian RPM Country 100 chart. "Honey, I'm Home" was included in both her Come on Over Tour and Up! Tour, as well as her Miami, Dallas and Chicago video specials.

== Music video ==
The music video for "Honey, I'm Home" was taken from Twain's Louisville, Kentucky concert on July 8, 1998, it was released on August 19, 1998, on CMT. The video was directed by Larry Jordan. This was the first of three live videos taken from Come on Over. Unlike the other two, "Come on Over" and "Rock This Country!", "Honey, I'm Home" documents the entire show, while the other two are just of the performance of the respective song. Two versions of the video were made, one dubbing the 'Original Album Version' audio over the live footage, and the other dubbing the 'International Single Mix' over the live soundtrack. The 'Original Album Version' is available on Twain's compilations Come On Over: Video Collection (1999) and The Platinum Collection (2001), while the 'International Mix' can be seen on YouTube.

== Chart performance ==
Mercury Nashville, Twain's label, did not release a commercial single for "Honey, I'm Home". Therefore, it was ineligible to enter the Billboard Hot 100 as before the December 5, 1998, issue, songs needed a commercial release to enter the chart.

"Honey, I'm Home" initially debuted on the Billboard Hot Country Singles & Tracks as an album track. The song initially debuted on November 15, 1997, at number 66. It would spend one more week at number 68 before falling off the chart next week. As an official single, "Honey, I'm Home" re-entered the chart on August 8, 1998, at number 70. The song entered the top ten in its tenth week on September 26, 1998, at number nine. The single kept rising at a steady pace before topping the chart on October 31, 1998; the song marked Twain's seventh and final number one hit at country radio. It would spend one week at number one and 26 weeks on the chart.

== Charts ==
=== Weekly charts ===
Chart (1998)	Peak position
Canada Country Singles (RPM)	1
US Hot Country Songs (Billboard)	1

=== Year-end charts ===
Chart (1998)	Position
Canada Country Tracks (RPM)	1
US Hot Country Singles & Tracks (Billboard)	50

== Certifications ==
Region	Certification	Certified units/sales
New Zealand (RMNZ)	Gold	15,000^{‡}
United States (RIAA)	Gold	500,000^{‡}
^{‡} Sales+streaming figures based on certification alone.
