= Come On Over Tour =

1998–99 concert tour by Shania Twain

- World tour by Shania Twain
- Promotional poster for 1998 tour
- Location: Australia; Europe; North America
- Associated album: Come On Over
- Start date: May 29, 1998
- End date: December 5, 1999
- Legs: 5
- No. of shows: 7 in Australia; 4 in Europe; 153 in North America; 164 in total
- Box office: $74.3 million ($146.76 million in 2025 dollars)

Shania Twain concert chronology
- Come On Over Tour (1998–99); Up! Tour (2003–04)

The Come On Over Tour was the debut concert tour by Canadian singer-songwriter Shania Twain, held in support of her third studio album, Come On Over (1997). The tour began on May 29, 1998, in Sudbury, and concluded on December 5, 1999, in West Palm Beach, with a total of 164 shows across North America, Australia and Europe. Deemed one of the most anticipated tours of the 1990s, the trek became the highest-grossing tour by a female country artist at the time. The tour was attended by over two million spectators and earned over $80 million. Additional accolades include being named the "Country Tour of the Year" in 1998 and 1999 by Pollstar Concert Industry Awards. Supporting Twain on the tour was family band Leahy and country artist Shane Minor. The tour was sponsored by Gitano Jeans.

== Background ==
The tour was announced by various media outlets in March 1998, when Twain's third album was certified five times platinum in the United States. The tour, named after the same album, was planned to begin in May 1998 in Sudbury (near Twain's hometown of Timmins) and ending December 1998 in Phoenix, Arizona. It became very popular, with many dates selling out within hours of the announcement. Most notably, the concerts at the Pine Knob Music Theatre in Clarkston, Michigan sold out in 29 minutes, a feat previously conquered by Metallica and The Who. The response led Twain to add additional dates in North America along with dates in Australia and the United Kingdom.

To introduce the tour, Twain narrated:

It's going to be a big party that I happen to be hosting. Pretty high energy for most of the time. I ['ll] get out on tour, I'll be able to do a full show of original songs that people will be familiar with. It's going to be ideal, almost like I couldn't have planned it better, even though I didn't really plan it at all. I am glad I waited, and I'm going to give it all I've got to make it everything the fans have been waiting for.

By 1998, Twain was an established country music sensation, selling over ten million albums, with her latest album selling over five million in the United States. Rumors began circulating within the media concerning Twain's vocal ability. Many critics saw Twain as a "studio voice", doubting her ability to sing live. The success of Come On Over prompted Twain to tour. Twain dismissed rumors stating at that time, she would rather focus on producing her next album than touring. She responded, "You have a huge record, you do a huge tour, you come home exhausted and you somehow have to turn out another record, fast, that everyone will compare to the first one. It was a very good decision not to tour in '95 [...] If I had toured then, [the tour] this year would not have been nearly as exciting." She further asserted she wanted to tour in 1995 but wanted the anticipation of a tour to build amongst her fan base. She further states she was very confident as a live performer, dismissing critics who felt Twain couldn't translate her success to the stage. Twain says she was proud to have her album, The Woman in Me, sell so well without a supporting tour. "It didn't make sense financially of course. I could have capitalized. But my intentions were to have a longer career than just that year."

Rehearsals began in May 1998 at the Olympic Center in Lake Placid, New York. Twain says she was shocked to hear of the success of the tour, believing she would only sellout floor seats in the arenas and amphitheaters where the concerts were performed. She would later comment on how comfortable she felt with touring compared to her early days of success as a nightclub performer in Ontario. Twain recalls traveling in busted vans, hauling her own equipment and the minimal wages she received during that time. However, she states she was very young and saw it as an opportunity to have fun. To help promote the tour, Twain held radio contests in the markets where she would perform. The winner would appear on stage with Twain to perform her first single, "What Made You Say That", with the band, while Twain performed the backing vocals. On March 18, 1999, at the Corel Centre in Ottawa, 14 year old Avril Lavigne performed on stage with Twain and was later signed to Arista Records the following year. For a similar contest, Twain chose nine singers and four drummers from Shaker Heights High School to perform onstage with her at Blossom Music Center in Cuyahoga Falls, Ohio.

On its premiere concert, Twain became emotional after performing "From This Moment On". After composing herself, she told the audience about the death of her parents and explained how it motivated her to have the life she's able to live now. She continued her story stating the last performance her parents saw of her was when she opened for Bernadette Peters and the Toronto Symphony Orchestra at the Roy Thomson Hall on February 8, 1987. While on the road, Twain received additional recognition, earning two Grammy Awards, diamond certification on both The Woman in Me and Come On Over and she appeared on VH1 Divas alongside Celine Dion, Gloria Estefan, Mariah Carey and Aretha Franklin. Furthermore, Twain participated in a benefit concert for Amnesty International in Paris, France at the Palais Omnisports de Paris-Bercy. She performed with Bruce Springsteen, Peter Gabriel, Alanis Morissette, and Radiohead. To continue her philanthropy, Twain visited survivors of the Columbine High School massacre and donated the proceeds of her May 11, 1999, concert at Coors Amphitheatre to the high school.

== Opening acts ==
- Leahy (North America—Leg 1 & 2) (Europe)
- Shane Minor (North America—Leg 2 & 3) (select dates)

== Set list ==
=== Set I ===
North America (leg 1 and 2), Australia and Europe

1. "Man! I Feel Like a Woman!"
2. "Honey, I'm Home"
3. "You Win My Love"
4. "Whose Bed Have Your Boots Been Under?"
5. "You're Still the One"
6. "I Won't Leave You Lonely"
7. "Come on Over"
8. "Love Gets Me Every Time"
9. "I'm Holdin' On to Love (To Save My Life)"
10. "When"
11. Medley: "Home Ain't Where His Heart Is (Anymore)" / "The Woman in Me (Needs the Man in You)" / "You've Got a Way"
12. "That Don't Impress Me Much"
13. "If It Don't Take Two" ^{3}
14. "Black Eyes, Blue Tears"
15. "God Bless the Child"
16. "What Made You Say That" ^{1}
17. "No One Needs to Know"
18. "Any Man of Mine"
19. "Don't Be Stupid (You Know I Love You)" ^{2}
20. "From This Moment On"
  Encore
21. "(If You're Not in It for Love) I'm Outta Here!" (contains elements of "Any Man of Mine")
22. "Rock This Country!"

^{1}Performed by local contest winner only, with Twain performing backing vocals.
^{2}Performed with opening act, Leahy, for the first two North American legs and Europe.
^{3}Performed at select dates.

=== Set II ===
North America (leg 3)

1. "Honey, I'm Home"
2. "Whose Bed Have Your Boots Been Under?"
3. "Love Gets Me Every Time"
4. "I Won't Leave You Lonely"
5. "When"
6. "That Don't Impress Me Much"
7. "Any Man of Mine"
8. "No One Needs to Know"
9. "Come on Over"
10. "You're Still the One"
11. "Rock This Country!"
12. "God Bless the Child"
13. "I'm Holdin' On to Love (To Save My Life)"
14. "Man! I Feel Like a Woman!"
15. "From This Moment On"
  Encore
16. "You Win My Love"
17. "Don't Be Stupid (You Know I Love You)"
18. "(If You're Not in It for Love) I'm Outta Here!"

== Band ==
- Marc Muller – pedal steel, guitar
- Randall Waller – guitar
- Brent Barcus – guitar
- Andy Cichon – bass
- J. D. Blair – drums
- Roddy Chong – fiddle, guitar, mandolin, percussion
- Allison Cornell – fiddle, keyboards, mandolin
- Hardy Hemphill – keyboards, percussion, harmonica, accordion
- Cory Churko – guitar, fiddle

== Tour dates ==
Date	City	Country	Venue
North America
May 29, 1998	Sudbury	Canada	Sudbury Community Arena
June 3, 1998	Edmonton	Canada	Edmonton Coliseum
June 4, 1998	Saskatoon	Canada	Saskatchewan Place
June 6, 1998	Calgary	Canada	Canadian Airlines Saddledome
June 7, 1998	Calgary	Canada	Canadian Airlines Saddledome
June 9, 1998	Vancouver	Canada	General Motors Place
June 10, 1998	Spokane	United States	Spokane Veterans Memorial Arena
June 13, 1998	Tacoma	United States	Tacoma Dome
June 15, 1998	Nampa	United States	Idaho Center Amphitheater
June 16, 1998	West Valley City	United States	E Center
June 18, 1998	Mountain View	United States	Shoreline Amphitheatre
June 19, 1998	Concord	United States	Concord Pavilion
June 21, 1998	Anaheim	United States	Arrowhead Pond of Anaheim
July 3, 1998^{[A]}	Milwaukee	United States	Marcus Amphitheater
July 6, 1998	Peoria	United States	Carver Arena
July 8, 1998	Louisville	United States	Freedom Hall
July 10, 1998	Columbus	United States	Polaris Amphitheater
July 11, 1998	Noblesville	United States	Deer Creek Music Center
July 14, 1998^{[B]}	Council Bluffs	United States	Westfair Amphitheater
July 15, 1998	Greenwood Village	United States	Coors Amphitheatre
July 17, 1998	Bonner Springs	United States	Sandstone Center for the Performing Arts
July 18, 1998	Maryland Heights	United States	Riverport Amphitheater
July 20, 1998	Clarkston	United States	Pine Knob Music Theatre
July 21, 1998	Clarkston	United States	Pine Knob Music Theatre
July 22, 1998	Grand Rapids	United States	Van Andel Arena
July 24, 1998	Minneapolis	United States	Target Center
July 25, 1998	Madison	United States	Kohl Center
August 7, 1998	Toronto	Canada	Molson Amphitheatre
August 8, 1998	Toronto	Canada	Molson Amphitheatre
August 10, 1998	Montreal	Canada	Molson Centre
August 14, 1998	Bristow	United States	Nissan Pavilion at Stone Ridge
August 15, 1998	Philadelphia	United States	CoreStates Center
August 17, 1998	Albany	United States	Pepsi Arena
August 18, 1998	Mansfield	United States	Great Woods Center for the Performing Arts
August 19, 1998	Hartford	United States	Meadows Music Theater
August 21, 1998	Holmdel	United States	PNC Bank Arts Center
August 22, 1998	Wantagh	United States	Jones Beach Amphitheater
August 24, 1998^{[C]}	Geddes	United States	New York State Fair Grandstand
August 25, 1998	Cuyahoga Falls	United States	Blossom Music Center
August 28, 1998	Cincinnati	United States	Riverbend Music Center
August 29, 1998	Tinley Park	United States	New World Music Theater
September 9, 1998	College Station	United States	Reed Arena
September 10, 1998	Austin	United States	Frank Erwin Center
September 12, 1998	Dallas	United States	Reunion Arena
September 17, 1998	West Palm Beach	United States	Coral Sky Amphitheater
September 18, 1998	Tampa	United States	Ice Palace
September 19, 1998	Orlando	United States	Orlando Arena
September 21, 1998	Tallahassee	United States	Tallahassee–Leon County Civic Center
September 25, 1998	Nashville	United States	Nashville Arena
September 26, 1998	Atlanta	United States	Coca-Cola Lakewood Amphitheater
October 11, 1998	Rapid City	United States	Rushmore Plaza Civic Center
October 12, 1998	Bismarck	United States	Bismarck Civic Center
October 15, 1998	Ames	United States	Hilton Coliseum
October 16, 1998	Rockford	United States	Rockford MetroCentre
October 17, 1998	Terre Haute	United States	Hulman Center
October 18, 1998	Evansville	United States	Roberts Municipal Stadium
October 21, 1998	Charleston	United States	Charleston Civic Center
October 22, 1998	Lexington	United States	Rupp Arena
October 24, 1998	Champaign	United States	Assembly Hall
October 25, 1998	East Lansing	United States	Breslin Student Events Center
October 27, 1998	Valley Center	United States	Brown Britt Arena
October 28, 1998	Oklahoma City	United States	Myriad Convention Center
October 30, 1998	Lafayette	United States	Cajundome
October 31, 1998	Houston	United States	Compaq Center
November 1, 1998	San Antonio	United States	Alamodome
November 5, 1998	Huntsville	United States	Von Braun Center
November 6, 1998	Chattanooga	United States	UTC Arena
November 7, 1998	Greenville	United States	BI-LO Center
November 10, 1998	Jackson	United States	Mississippi Coliseum
November 11, 1998	Little Rock	United States	Barton Coliseum
November 13, 1998	Biloxi	United States	Mississippi Coast Coliseum
November 14, 1998	Memphis	United States	Pyramid Arena
November 15, 1998	Birmingham	United States	BJCC Arena
November 17, 1998	Roanoke	United States	Roanoke Civic Center
November 18, 1998	North Charleston	United States	North Charleston Coliseum
November 20, 1998	Knoxville	United States	Thompson–Boling Arena
November 21, 1998	Chapel Hill	United States	Dean Smith Center
November 22, 1998	Charlotte	United States	Charlotte Coliseum
November 24, 1998	Hampton	United States	Hampton Coliseum
December 2, 1998	Pocatello	United States	Holt Arena
December 3, 1998	Billings	United States	MetraPark Arena
December 5, 1998	Fargo	United States	Fargodome
December 15, 1998	Buffalo	United States	Marine Midland Arena
December 16, 1998	Rochester	United States	Blue Cross Arena
December 17, 1998^{[D]}	New York City	United States	Madison Square Garden
December 19, 1998	University Park	United States	Bryce Jordan Center
December 20, 1998	Baltimore	United States	Baltimore Arena
December 30, 1998	Albuquerque	United States	Tingley Coliseum
December 31, 1998	Phoenix	United States	America West Arena
January 2, 1999	Las Vegas	United States	MGM Grand Garden Arena
January 15, 1999	Miami	United States	Bayfront Park Amphitheater
January 16, 1999	Miami	United States	Bayfront Park Amphitheater
Australia
February 9, 1999	Brisbane	Australia	Brisbane Entertainment Centre
February 11, 1999	Newcastle	Australia	Newcastle Entertainment Centre
February 12, 1999	Sydney	Australia	Sydney Entertainment Centre
February 13, 1999	Sydney	Australia	Sydney Entertainment Centre
February 16, 1999	Adelaide	Australia	Adelaide Entertainment Centre
February 17, 1999	Melbourne	Australia	Centre Court
February 18, 1999	Melbourne	Australia	Centre Court
North America
February 22, 1999^{[E]}	Houston	United States	Reliant Astrodome
March 13, 1999	Moncton	Canada	Moncton Coliseum
March 15, 1999	Montreal	Canada	Molson Centre
March 17, 1999	Ottawa	Canada	Corel Centre
March 18, 1999	Ottawa	Canada	Corel Centre
March 20, 1999	Quebec City	Canada	Colisée de Québec
March 22, 1999	Hamilton	Canada	Copps Coliseum
March 23, 1999	Toronto	Canada	Air Canada Centre
March 26, 1999	Winnipeg	Canada	Winnipeg Arena
March 27, 1999	Winnipeg	Canada	Winnipeg Arena
March 29, 1999	Saskatoon	Canada	Saskatchewan Place
March 30, 1999	Calgary	Canada	Canadian Airlines Saddledome
March 31, 1999	Edmonton	Canada	Skyreach Centre
April 2, 1999	Kamloops	Canada	Riverside Coliseum
April 3, 1999	Vancouver	Canada	General Motors Place
May 4, 1999	Sacramento	United States	ARCO Arena
May 6, 1999	Los Angeles	United States	Hollywood Bowl
May 7, 1999	Chula Vista	United States	Coors Amphitheater
May 8, 1999	San Bernardino	United States	Blockbuster Pavilion
May 11, 1999	Greenwood Village	United States	Fiddler's Green Amphitheatre
May 14, 1999	Bonner Springs	United States	Sandstone Amphitheatre
May 15, 1999	Maryland Heights	United States	Riverport Amphitheater
May 17, 1999	Noblesville	United States	Deer Creek Music Center
May 18, 1999	Burgettstown	United States	Coca-Cola Star Lake Amphitheater Center
May 20, 1999	Chicago	United States	United Center
May 21, 1999	Columbus	United States	Polaris Amphitheater
May 22, 1999	Auburn Hills	United States	The Palace of Auburn Hills
May 24, 1999	Minneapolis	United States	Target Center
May 26, 1999	Milwaukee	United States	Marcus Amphitheater
May 28, 1999	Bristow	United States	Nissan Pavilion at Stone Ridge
May 29, 1999	Philadelphia	United States	First Union Center
May 30, 1999	Hershey	United States	Hersheypark Stadium
June 1, 1999	Memphis	United States	Pyramid Arena
June 2, 1999	Nashville	United States	First American Music Center
June 4, 1999	Jacksonville	United States	Alltel Stadium
June 9, 1999	Charlotte	United States	Blockbuster Pavilion
June 11, 1999	Virginia Beach	United States	Virginia Beach Amphitheater
June 12, 1999	Raleigh	United States	Alltel Pavilion at Walnut Creek
June 14, 1999	Boston	United States	FleetCenter
June 15, 1999	New York City	United States	Madison Square Garden
June 17, 1999	Cleveland	United States	Gund Arena
June 18, 1999	Geddes	United States	New York State Fair Grandstand
June 19, 1999	Albany	United States	Pepsi Arena
June 24, 1999	Portland	United States	Rose Garden
June 25, 1999	Vancouver	Canada	General Motors Place
June 26, 1999	George	United States	Gorge Amphitheatre
July 1, 1999	Timmins	Canada	Hollinger Park
Europe
July 6, 1999	Glasgow	Scotland	Scottish Exhibition Centre
July 7, 1999	Birmingham	England	NEC Arena
July 8, 1999	London	England	Wembley Arena
July 10, 1999	Dublin	Ireland	RDS Arena
North America
November 14, 1999	Irving	United States	Texas Stadium
November 16, 1999	New Orleans	United States	New Orleans Arena
November 18, 1999	Atlanta	United States	Philips Arena
November 19, 1999	Birmingham	United States	BJCC Arena
November 20, 1999	Greensboro	United States	Greensboro Coliseum
November 22, 1999	Cincinnati	United States	Firstar Center
November 24, 1999	Washington, D.C.	United States	MCI Center
November 26, 1999	Trenton	United States	Sovereign Bank Arena
November 27, 1999	Hartford	United States	Hartford Civic Center
November 29, 1999	Richmond	United States	Richmond Coliseum
November 30, 1999	Greenville	United States	BI-LO Center
December 3, 1999	Orlando	United States	Orlando Arena
December 4, 1999	Tampa	United States	Ice Palace
December 5, 1999	West Palm Beach	United States	Coral Sky Amphitheater

Festivals and other miscellaneous performances
^{A} This concert was a part of Summerfest
^{B} This concert was a part of Westfair County Fair
^{C} This concert was a part of Great New York State Fair
^{D} This concert was a part of Z-100's Annual Jingle Ball
^{E} This concert was a part of Houston Livestock Show and Rodeo

=== Box office score data ===
Venue	City	Tickets sold / available	Gross revenue
General Motors Place	Vancouver	35,527 / 35,527 (100%)	$1,289,975
Arrowhead Pond of Anaheim	Anaheim	13,138 / 13,138 (100%)	$508,270
Pine Knob Music Theatre	Clarkston	30,548 / 30,548 (100%)	$938,675
Molson Amphitheatre	Toronto	31,911 / 31,911 (100%)	$740,374
BCC Arena	Bismarck	8,346 / 8,346 (100%)	$270,039
Compaq Center	Houston	11,790 / 11,790 (100%)	$411,480
Alamodome	San Antonio	11,058 / 11,058 (100%)	$339,841
BI-LO Center	Greenville	14,604 / 14,604 (100%)	$420,470
Mississippi Coast Coliseum	Biloxi	10,675 / 10,675 (100%)	$339,253
Pyramid Arena	Memphis	18,915 / 18,915 (100%)	$754,723
BJCC Arena	Birmingham	13,500 / 16,000 (84%)	$418,771
Thompson–Boling Arena	Knoxville	14,570 / 14,820 (98%)	$447,385
Marine Midland Arena	Buffalo	16,759 / 21,452 (78%)	$606,671
Bryce Jordan Center	University Park	15,100 / 15,274 (99%)	$506,375
America West Arena	Phoenix	16,128 / 18,135 (89%)	$882,960
MGM Grand Garden Arena	Las Vegas	11,169 / 15,953 (70%)	$872,210
Corel Centre	Ottawa	33,126 / 33,126 (100%)	$945,621
Winnipeg Arena	Winnipeg	29,186 / 29,186 (100%)	$822,918
ARCO Arena	Sacramento	12,937 / 13,500 (96%)	$709,622
Hollywood Bowl	Los Angeles	15,011 / 15,011 (100%)	$674,050
Coors Amphitheater	Chula Vista	15,604 / 19,442 (80%)	$593,858
Sandstone Amphitheatre	Bonner Springs	17,569 / 17,569 (100%)	$589,684
Riverport Amphitheater	Maryland Heights	20,904 / 20,904 (100%)	$682,317
Deer Creek Music Center	Noblesville	21,267 / 21,267 (100%)	$684,433
United Center	Chicago	19,155 / 19,155 (100%)	$934,408
Palace of Auburn Hills	Auburn Hills	21,472 / 21,472 (100%)	$897,785
Target Center	Minneapolis	18,267 / 18,439 (99%)	$839,873
First Union Center	Philadelphia	18,268 / 18,268 (100%)	$935,968
Hersheypark Stadium	Hershey	26,609 / 26,609 (100%)	$1,024,710
FleetCenter	Boston	17,543 / 17,543 (100%)	$770,818
Madison Square Garden	New York City	18,371 / 18,371 (100%)	$1,018,695
Gund Arena	Cleveland	20,173 / 20,173 (100%)	$695,978
Rose Garden	Portland	16,190 / 16,190 (100%)	$697,235
Gorge Amphitheatre	George	20,000 / 20,000 (100%)	$673,570
TOTAL		635,390 / 654,371 (97%)	$23,939,015

== Broadcasts and recordings ==
Twain filmed the tour on three separate occasions. For video release, the concert at the Reunion Arena in Dallas on September 12, 1998. It featured Twain performing all of her hit songs from her first three albums. The show aired live on DirecTV for its customers at no additional cost. The footage was released the following year titled Live. The video was certified platinum by the RIAA for shipments exceeding 100,000 units. In 1999, the concerts at the Bayfront Park Amphitheatre were filmed for a concert special airing on TNN. The special entitled Shania Twain: Winter Break gave the viewer a behind-the-scenes look of the tour and Twain's personal life. At the concerts, Twain was joined onstage by English recording artist Elton John, to perform "You're Still the One", "Something About the Way You Look Tonight" and "Amneris' Letter". On January 16, 1999, Twain was also joined by American boyband, the Backstreet Boys to perform their hit, "All I Have to Give" and Twain's "From This Moment On". The special aired on August 30, 1999.

After the release of her "Live" video, Twain filmed an additional concert special at the Texas Stadium in Irving, Texas. Named Come On Over, Twain performed in front of 40,000 spectators for the special, which aired on CBS on Thanksgiving night. In 2001, both specials were released to DVD titled The Specials, showing highlights from both concerts. Twain's benefit concert in Paris The Paris Concert for Amnesty, filmed on December 10, 1998, was highlighted on the DVD release, The Paris Concert for Amnesty International. It featured only two performances, "Black Eyes, Blue Tears" and "You're Still the One". The full concert aired on Viewers Choice in Canada.

To commemorate the 25th Anniversary of "Come On Over Tour", Twain premiered the live performance, "Come On Over Tour: Live in Dallas" on YouTube on September 12, 2023, and limited for 24 hours.

The Paris Concert for Amnesty
1. "(If You're Not in It for Love) I'm Outta Here!"
2. "Honey, I'm Home"
3. "You Win My Love"
4. "You're Still the One"
5. "Black Eyes, Blue Tears"
6. "God Bless the Child"
7. "Don't Be Stupid (You Know I Love You)"
8. "Man! I Feel Like a Woman!"

== Critical reception ==
Although the tour became a financial success, it received mixed feedback from music critics. John Young (Pittsburgh Post-Gazette) found the concert at the Coca-Cola Lakewood Amphitheater "too perfect". He writes: "There is nothing inherently wrong with big, loud pop music when its delivered with occasional country twinges. But Twain's music sounded almost too slick and perfectly packaged. Her hit 'You're Still the One,' lacked soul and fire, while most other tunes missing any distinguishing characteristics that made them Twain's own." The performance at the Spokane Veterans Memorial Arena was called "electrifying" by Chris Wille (The Spokesman-Review). He states: "The night's highlight? Practically every song. On 'Any Man [o]f Mine,' fans sang along. After '(If You're Not In It for Love) I'm Outta Here!' Twain disappeared through a giant drum, returning in yet another costume. She owned the crowd, and they loved every second of it".

== See also ==
- List of highest-grossing concert tours by women
