= When (Shania Twain song) =

1998 single by Shania Twain

Single by Shania Twain

from the album Come On Over
- B-side: "Don't Be Stupid (You Know I Love You)"; "You're Still the One"; "That Don't Impress Me Much"
- Released: June 1, 1998
- Studio: Masterfonics (Nashville, Tennessee)
- Length: 3:28
- Label: Mercury
- Songwriters: Robert John "Mutt" Lange; Shania Twain
- Producer: Robert John "Mutt" Lange

Shania Twain singles chronology
"From This Moment On" (1998)	"When" (1998)	"Honey, I'm Home" (1998)

Music video
- "When" on YouTube

"When" is a song recorded by Canadian country-pop singer Shania Twain. It was released on June 1, 1998, as the second single in the UK and overall fifth single from her third studio album, Come On Over (1997). The song was written by Twain and her then-husband and producer, Robert John "Mutt" Lange. It was the only single from Come on Over to not be released in the United States. It was later released in 2000 in Canada to pop radio. Twain has stated that "When" is her favourite song from Come On Over.

"When" had moderate impact on the charts, reaching the top twenty in the UK and Canada while peaking at number eight on Canada's adult contemporary chart. The song was included in the Come on Over Tour and in a medley for the Up! Tour. In 2023, she performed the song in a medley, with four songs from the Up! album, on her Queen of Me Tour. "When" is also the theme song for the Japanese drama Cheap Love.

== Chart performance ==
In the UK, "When" became Twain's second top-20 single. It debuted, at its peak, on June 13, 1998, at number 18. It remained on the chart for four weeks. It has sold 53,429 copies in the UK as of 2017.

== Music video ==
The music video for "When" was shot in New York City, and directed by Markus Blunder. It was released exclusively to the United Kingdom and was played once in the United States on CMT's Video Bio for Twain. The video starts with Twain apparently dying and becoming an angel, and then she goes around New York City, pursuing her love interest. The ending of the video shows her love interest placing a note under her door, which Twain opens to reveal an angel drawing and collapsing on her bed, mirroring the opening scene. The last scene shows Twain's angel form re-entering her body, symbolizing that she was only daydreaming the whole time. Performance scenes featuring Twain sitting on a bed singing the song are also intercut throughout the video. Her stunt double was actress Alissa Dean. Two versions of the video were released, one with the 'Original Album Version', which is more country, and one with the 'International Version', which is more pop. Both versions of the video have rarely been screened since the single release. "When" is the only video from Twain's first three albums to not be included on her compilations Come On Over: Video Collection and The Platinum Collection, although the rare 'International Version' is available on select CD singles.

== Track listings ==
- UK CD single
1. "When" (international radio edit) – 3:28
2. "Don't Be Stupid (You Know I Love You)" (international LP version) – 3:34
3. "That Don't Impress Me Much" (international LP version) – 3:38
- UK CD Single Limited Edition
1. "When" (international radio edit) – 3:28
2. "You're Still The One" (Soul Solution radio edit) – 4:08
3. "You're Still The One" (Soul Solution extended club mix) – 8:42
4. "Don't Be Stupid (You Know I Love You)" (international LP version) – 3:37
- Europe CD single
1. "When" (international radio edit) – 3:28
2. "You're Still The One" (Soul Solution Dance – radio edit) – 4:03
- Japan CD single
1. "When" – 3:39
2. "Don't Be Stupid (You Know I Love You)" – 3:34
3. "That Don't Impress Me Much" – 3:38

== Charts ==
Chart (1998–2000)	Peak position
Belgium (Ultratip Bubbling Under Flanders)	12
Canada Top Singles (RPM)	14
Canada Adult Contemporary (RPM)	8
Europe (European Hot 100 Singles)	74
Scottish Singles Sales (Official Charts)	18
UK Singles (Official Charts)	18

== Release history ==
Region	Date	Format(s)	Label(s)	Ref.
United Kingdom	June 1, 1998	CD; cassette	Mercury	
Japan	June 29, 1998	CD	Mercury	
Japan	November 10, 1999	Mini-CD	Mercury	
