= Come On Over =

1997 studio album by Shania Twain

- Standard edition cover

Studio album by Shania Twain
- Released: November 4, 1997
- Studios: Emerald Sound; GBT; Masterfonics Tracking Room; Seventeen Grand Recording (Nashville); Sven (Mamaroneck, New York); Sound Barries (New York); Glenn Gould (Toronto)
- Genres: Country; pop; rock
- Length: 60:08
- Label: Mercury
- Producer: Robert John "Mutt" Lange

Shania Twain chronology
The Woman in Me (1995)	Come On Over (1997)	The Complete Limelight Sessions (2001)

Alternative cover
- International edition cover

Singles from Come On Over
- 1. "Love Gets Me Every Time" Released: September 22, 1997; 2. "Don't Be Stupid (You Know I Love You)" Released: November 10, 1997; 3. "You're Still the One" Released: January 13, 1998; 4. "From This Moment On" Released: May 4, 1998; 5. "When" Released: June 1, 1998; 6. "Honey, I'm Home" Released: August 10, 1998; 7. "That Don't Impress Me Much" Released: December 7, 1998; 8. "Man! I Feel Like a Woman!" Released: March 1999; 9. "You've Got a Way" Released: June 1999; 10. "Come On Over" Released: September 7, 1999; 11. "Rock This Country!" Released: January 10, 2000; 12. "I'm Holdin' On to Love (To Save My Life)" Released: July 3, 2000

Come On Over is the third studio album by Canadian singer-songwriter Shania Twain. Mercury Records in North America released it on November 4, 1997. Similar to her work on its predecessor, The Woman in Me (1995), Twain entirely collaborated with producer and then-husband Robert John "Mutt" Lange. With both having busy schedules, they often wrote apart and later intertwined their ideas. Twain wanted to improve her songwriting skills and write a conversational album reflecting her personality and beliefs. The resulting songs explore themes of romance and female empowerment, addressed with humour.

Produced by Lange, Come On Over is a country pop album with pop and rock influences. The songs contain country instrumentation such as acoustic guitars, fiddles, and pedal steel, in addition to rock riffs and electric guitars. She released an international version on February 16, 1998, with a pop-oriented production that toned down the country instrumentation and also had an altered track listing. Then Twain embarked on the Come On Over Tour, which ran from May 1998 to December 1999. The album spawned 12 singles, including three U.S. Billboard Hot 100 top-ten hits—"You're Still the One", "From This Moment On" and "That Don't Impress Me Much", and the global top-ten "Man! I Feel Like a Woman!".

Come On Over received mixed reviews from music critics. Some appreciated the album's crossover appeal and country-pop experimentation, while others criticized the lyrics and questioned its country music categorization. At the 41st Annual Grammy Awards in 1999, Come On Over was nominated for Album of the Year and Best Country Album. The album reached number two on the U.S. Billboard 200 chart, while topping the charts in multiple countries, including Australia, Canada, and the UK.

Come On Over is the best-selling studio album by a woman, the best-selling country album, and one of the best-selling albums of all time, having sold over 40 million copies worldwide. It was certified 20× platinum by the Recording Industry Association of America (RIAA) in 2004. Retrospectively, music journalists praised the album for revolutionizing country music, both musically and visually, and discussed its influence on subsequent country artists.

== Background ==
Canadian singer Shania Twain signed to U.S. label Mercury Nashville Records in 1991, and released her eponymous debut studio album in April 1993. It was a commercial failure, reaching number 67 on the U.S. Top Country Albums chart and selling just over 100,000 copies. However, the music video for the album's lead single, "What Made You Say That," and Twain's singing voice attracted the interest of Zambian record producer Robert John "Mutt" Lange. The two collaborated on songwriting via phone calls, and met for the first time at the Nashville Fan Fair festival in June 1993. Soon after, they established a romantic relationship and wedded in December 1993. Together they worked on Twain's second studio album, The Woman in Me. They released it in 1995, and it represented Twain's break with the conventional country music formula to experiment with a rock-influenced country pop sound.

It sold over 10 million copies, surpassing Patsy Cline's Greatest Hits (1967) as the best-selling female country album of all time, and establishing Twain as a sensation on the country music scene. The Woman in Me spawned four number-one singles on the U.S. Hot Country Songs chart and won Album of the Year and Best Country Album at the 31st Academy of Country Music Awards and the 38th Annual Grammy Awards, respectively. Despite the commercial success, Twain refused to embark on a tour to support it. Her risky decision sparked criticism and speculation from Nashville industry experts that she was a manufactured artist with no ability to perform live. Twain cited a lack of logistical support, her reluctance to sing cover songs due to not having enough powerful music, and also a desire to take time off and focus on writing songs for her next album. A concert tour, she suggested, would have distracted her from improving her songwriting.

== Writing ==
It's quite fun. It's relaxed, there's nothing contrived and it's really natural. If anything, when you know each other so well, there are fewer inhibitions, because I would be afraid to reveal so much to someone else. Our writing styles complement each other. We both come from different places. Lyrically, we think differently enough to make it interesting.

— Twain speaking on her songwriting partnership with her then-husband Robert John "Mutt" Lange.

As with The Woman in Me, Twain and Lange composed all of the songs on Come On Over. They crafted material for the album "sporadically" as early as 1994, including "You've Got a Way." Twain composed the lyrics at Michael Bolton's New Jersey home, while Lange worked on Bolton's 1995 greatest hits compilation. Due to Twain's busy promotional schedule for The Woman in Me, she and Lange often worked separately, and then later amalgamated the parts. Twain documented her ideas on devices she carried with her at all times. She wrote rough drafts of music and lyrics in a notebook, and recorded bits of melodies on a small tape recorder or a MiniDisc. She explained, "We write everywhere. When we're driving to the grocery store we write. Sometimes, I come up with a melody when we're in the car and if I didn't bring the tape deck, I have to sing it all the way home so I don't forget it. When I get home I run to the tape deck to record it." Twain's longtime friend, Hélène Bolduc, noted how the singer perpetually observed others. She then wrote these observations in her notebook, and later referred to them while composing or when coming up with a title.

When Twain and Lange wrote together, it was typically after they had spent significant time in each other's company. The couple found it difficult to compose music after being separated for a long time. Rather than scheduling time for songwriting, they waited for it to surface gradually. The pair wrote much of the material when they were relaxed, almost bored, because that was when the process felt most natural. While Twain concentrated on the concepts and themes, Lange worked on the music and arrangements. Conceiving Come On Over as a conversational album, Twain incorporated common phrases used in everyday language into her songwriting. As a result of the positive response to The Woman in Me, she also felt "freer and more comfortable" to continue writing songs that expressed her personal beliefs and attitudes. "People seemed to like hearing my perspective from a woman's point of view," she said, "and they seemed to like a sense of humour, so it seemed natural to continue on with that."

== Production and recording ==
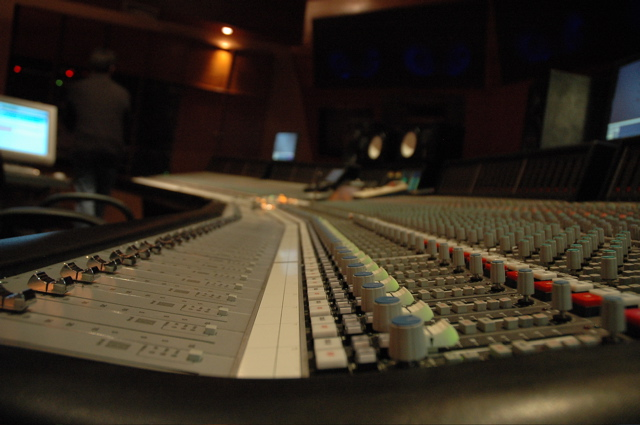
Mike Shipley used a SSL 9000 J console for mixing Come On Over.

Twain and Lange began the recording process for Come On Over in late 1996. Before recording, Lange called session drummer Paul Leim and played him every song, singing and accompanying himself on guitar. Wanting to capture "a real fun Motown feel," Lange had several conversations with audio engineer Jeff Balding, singing and detailing the musical direction. Balding added, "A lot of thought went into it before we came into the studio to do the tracks." All tracks were recorded over three weeks at Masterfonics Tracking Room in Nashville, Tennessee. Finding the right location to place the drum kit was one challenging task, and they tested several locations. Leim recorded the drums for most songs in a room with a stone floor, and walls made of reflective rock faces. He recorded the ballads in "small 'dead booths.'" Joe Chemay played electric and fretless bass, Biff Watson played acoustic and nylon-string guitar, and Twain sang scratch vocals. Steppenwolf member Larry Byrom played the slide guitar tracks, and then recorded them at the GBT Studio. Olle Romo programmed the music at Sven Studios in Mamaroneck, New York. Twain and Lange recorded the background vocals in Toronto at the Glenn Gould Studio, and later returned to Masterfonics for overdubs.

Whilst having a specific vision for the sound of the songs, Lange also left room for the musicians to come up with their own touches. Recalling the recording of "You've Got a Way," Chemay remarked: "The fretless bass allowed me to slide and make gradual note and pitch changes. I had quite a lot of input on that song." For the fiddle recording, both Twain and Lange were of the opinion that the instruments did not sound "big enough." Thus, Lange brought in four fiddle players: Rob Hajacos, Joe Spivey, Glen Duncan, and Aubrey Haynie. (Note: Credited as the "Bow Bros." in the liner notes of Come On Over.) They played the exact same part in unison. Additional engineer Bob Bullock noted that this technique made the instruments sound big without being cluttered, creating a different effect than "simply doubling or tripling a part by the same player." For some songs they placed microphones six to eight inches from each fiddle. For other songs, all four fiddle players stood in a semicircle, using two Neumann KM 582 microphones. After recording was finished, Mike Shipley mixed Come On Over using a SSL 9000 J console. Glenn Meadows at Masterfonics mastered the album with a SADiE's Apogee UV22 plug-in.

== Musical style ==
Music critics debated the album's genre. Most categorized Come On Over as country pop. (Note: Attributed to AllMusic, MTV News, NPR, The Philadelphia Inquirer, The San Bernardino County Sun, and Time.) Christopher O'Connor of MTV News and Miriam Longino of The Atlanta Constitution remarked that the songs combined country music instruments, such as fiddles, pedal steel, and acoustic guitars, with radio-friendly pop hooks. Pitchfork's Allison Hussey stated that "fiddles are the key element in transmitting Come On Over's country core," but the "smeared edges of [Twain and Lange's] production [...] master the illusion of genre." Others argued that the album's production leaned more toward pop and adult contemporary music than country. (Note: Attributed to such sources as Richard Carlin's Country Music: A Very Short Introduction, Democrat and Chronicle, The News & Observer, and the Courier Journal.) Twain described Come On Over as a diverse and upbeat album that equally combined elements of country, pop, and rock music. Many critics noted rock influences in the album's instrumentation. (Note: Attributed to such sources as MTV News, NPR, The Gazette, The New York Times, The Standard-Times, and The Tennessean.)

According to Jon Pareles of The New York Times, the verses on Come On Over contained "a big, blunt rock beat," while the choruses were country, with fiddles and pedal steel guitars. The album's opening track, "Man! I Feel Like a Woman!," uses twang vocal delivery, synthesized strings, and electric guitar, which some journalists compared to Norman Greenbaum's "Spirit in the Sky" (1969). (Note: Attributed to such sources as Entertainment Weekly, National Post, Scott Gray's On Her Way: The Shania Twain Story, and The Baltimore Sun.) Described as a "country-pop-metal mix," "Love Gets Me Every Time" blends steel and "funky" electric guitars with fiddle and pedal steel. "Honey, I'm Home" is an uptempo country rock track featuring bluesy fiddles, guitars, and drums. It incorporates a stomp-clap rhythm which some critics found similar to Queen's "We Will Rock You" (1977). (Note: Attributed to such sources as Entertainment Weekly, News-Pilot, The Baltimore Sun, The New York Times, and The Philadelphia Inquirer.) "If You Wanna Touch Her, Ask!" and "Black Eyes, Blue Tears" are guitar-driven songs; the former is a blues rock song, while the latter features grunge pop influences.

"I Won't Leave You Lonely" is a "European-flavored" song with juxtaposed accordions and pedal steel. The rhythm guitar track has been noted for its similarities to the Police's "Every Breath You Take" (1983). On "Rock This Country!," Twain sings over "pounding" beats, power chords, electric guitars, and fiddles. Some critics described other tracks with more uptempo productions, such as "Don't Be Stupid (You Know I Love You)" and "That Don't Impress Me Much," as dance-able country pop numbers. In addition to an electronic Caribbean beat, the mandolin and accordion-led Latin percussion on the title track create a Cajun sound. Among the ballads on the album, "From This Moment On" combines country and rock elements. The piano-based "You're Still the One" features breathy vocals and instrumentation from guitar, organ, and mandolin. The closing track "You've Got a Way" is a Spanish guitar-driven ballad with "gentle" drums.

== Lyrics and themes ==
Thematically and lyrically, Twain and Lange focused on accentuating the positive. Thus, Twain omitted personal details and focused on entertaining her listeners. "People ask me, 'What do you want people to get from your music?' And I say, 'I want them to be entertained.' That's really the bottom line. I'm not sending out some subliminal message or trying to change the consciousness of people." The songs on Come On Over reflect Twain's concerns, interests, and day-to-day preoccupations. She conveyed her personality through "witty" and "sassy" lyrics, as per Lange's encouragement, (Note: On Lange's support for her songwriting for Come On Over, Twain said: "It's basically my personality coming out in my lyrics. My husband is partly responsible for that, he encourages it in me. I haven't always been brave enough to say some of the things I've said through my songs. I'll show him a song and he'll say 'You've got to say it like it is. Be yourself. So come up with all these lyrics that are fun, and independent.' ") and she approached her topics with humor. She sourced many of the titles' pert puns, exclamation marks, and double entendres from Lange. According to music industry executive Ralph Simon "[Lange] was always the master of the double entendre; if ever there is some sexual ambiguity in the lyric, it's down to [him]." The album's predominant themes were love and romantic relationships. "I'm Holdin' On to Love (To Save My Life)" contains references to horoscopes, the internet, psychiatrists, and Dr. Ruth as "superficial crutches" to save one's life rather than love. In "Don't Be Stupid (You Know I Love You)," Twain reassures a jealous and possessive partner.

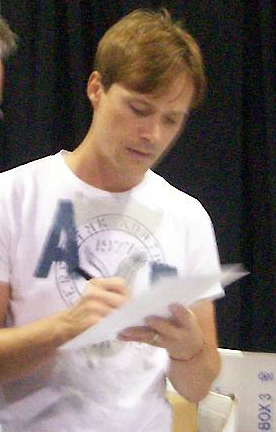
Twain recorded "From This Moment On" as a duet with Bryan White. He described the recording as "extremely challenging" vocally.

"From This Moment On" is a duet with country singer Bryan White. Twain originally wrote the song with another artist in mind, hoping to pitch it to a "powerhouse" vocalist like Céline Dion. However, Lange convinced Twain to record it, although she initially felt uncomfortable singing a power ballad. "When" used metaphors and scenarios of an idealistic world to describe a broken relationship. Twain said it was her favorite song lyrically: "I love the whole concept. It's a neat way of saying 'never' about a relationship. Like saying 'when hell freezes over' without saying that." The "wry, chiding" humorous lyrics of "Whatever You Do! Don't!" find a vulnerable Twain "falling head over heels for a guy who seems to do everything just right." In "You're Still the One," she celebrates a successful relationship that has prevailed despite turmoil, hardships, and criticism. The lyrics were inspired by her marriage to her then-husband Lange, and the people who considered their relationship unlikely to succeed. The tongue-in-cheek "That Don't Impress Me Much" depicts her indifferent attitude toward self-absorbed men who emphasize material things, intelligence, or physical beauty, rather than personality and heart. In "I Won't Leave You Lonely," Twain added verses in French and Spanish to broaden the song's universal appeal.

Apart from romance, Come On Over explores women's issues and experiences. "Man! I Feel Like a Woman!" is a self-celebratory song about female empowerment, hedonism, and women's liberty. "If You Wanna Touch Her, Ask!" explores themes of sexual consent and respecting a woman's personal space. Twain said the song was inspired by awkward feelings she experienced in her adolescence due to her physical development. However, she decided to write it from a positive perspective and sing about how to sensitively approach a woman. Twain narrates the role reversal song "Honey, I'm Home" from the perspective of a working woman coming home after a difficult day and demanding that her partner take care of her. The song drew some comparisons to Dolly Parton's "9 to 5" (1980). "Black Eyes, Blue Tears" is about domestic abuse and depicts a woman leaving a physically abusive relationship, with lyrics such as "I'd rather die standing than live on my knees, begging please." Twain wrote this from an optimistic perspective, and associated the song's theme with the 1991 American film Thelma & Louise. "I wanted to show that there's life after abuse, as opposed to doom and destruction."

== Packaging and release ==
Twain originally wanted to title the album No Inhibitions, but opted for Come On Over because she considered the title track one of her favorites and appreciated its inviting nature. Mercury Records released the album in North America on November 4, 1997. With 16 songs and a running time of slightly over an hour, Come On Over distinguished itself by deviating from the traditional standard of "cheap, short" country albums, typically consisting of only 10-12 tracks and a duration of under 35–40 minutes. George Holz designed the red and white cover artwork. It depicted Twain in a "come-hither pose," wearing a red shirt and holding her hands over her head.

When the album was complete, Lange spent four months remixing it for international release. He removed country elements from the songs to achieve a "universal" pop-oriented sound. He made the snare drums, fiddles, and pedal steel more subtle, and replaced them with pop beats, drum loops, keyboards, and synthesizers. 15 songs underwent sonic changes, with the exception of "Rock This Country!" which remained in its original version. For "From This Moment On," Twain sang solo. She also recorded two new versions, one in collaboration with Brazilian duo Chitãozinho & Xororó, and another with Irish singer Ronan Keating. However, these versions of "From This Moment On" were never released.

Mercury released the international version of Come On Over in continental Europe on February 16, 1998, with a different track order and new artwork. The cover showed Twain with tousled hair, wearing a sleeveless silver gown, and turning toward the camera. A special edition was issued in Australia in 1998 featuring a live version of "(If You're Not in It for Love) I'm Outta Here!" and dance mixes for "Love Gets Me Every Time" and "Don't Be Stupid (You Know I Love You)." The Australian tour edition included a second disc. It contained an additional single mix of "God Bless the Child" (1996), a live medley of "Home Ain't Where His Heart Is (Anymore)," "The Woman in Me (Needs the Man in You)" (1995), and "You've Got a Way," and the original country version of "From This Moment On."

In 1999, Mercury issued a revised international edition of Come On Over. It included the pop radio mixes of "You're Still the One" and "From This Moment On", the Notting Hill remix of "You've Got a Way", and the "UK dance mix" of "That Don't Impress Me Much". They released this version in the U.S. on November 23, 1999, after the singles' success on pop radio. In Japan, Mercury released a limited edition 10 days earlier. It featured both a radio edit and the album version of "You're Still the One," as well as a "Mach 3 remix" of "Love Gets Me Every Time". Mercury released a version on increasingly popular vinyl on December 2, 2016. A special digital edition of Come On Over was released on December 4, 2022, including two live versions of "You're Still the One" with Elton John and Chris Martin, and a live version of "Party for Two" (2004) with Nick Jonas.

In July 2023, during the Queen of Me Tour, Twain announced Come On Over: Diamond Edition, to celebrate the album's 25th anniversary, released on August 25, 2023. This version includes both the original North American version and the revised international version of the album on separate discs.

== Promotion ==
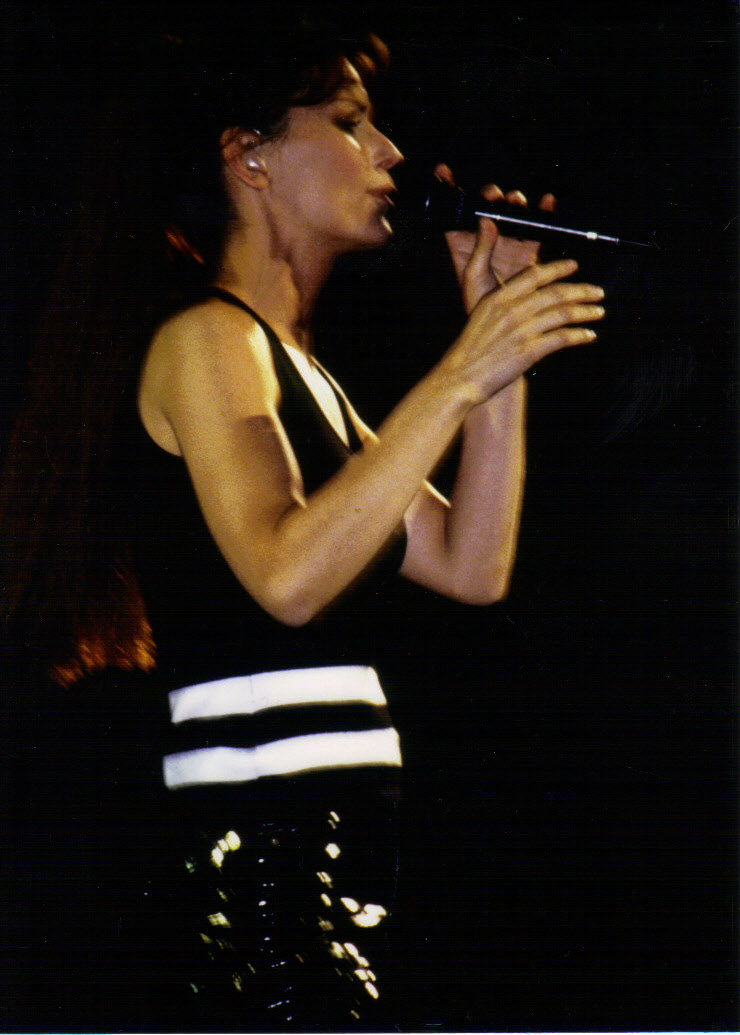
Twain performing on the Come On Over Tour in Boston, Massachusetts in June 1999.

Mercury implemented an extensive promotional campaign for Come On Over. To market it, Twain performed "Love Gets Me Every Time" at the 1997 Country Music Association Awards and held album signing sessions in the U.S. at the Mall of America in Bloomington, Minnesota, and in Canada at the Southcentre Mall in Calgary. She appeared on a series of American television shows, including The Tonight Show with Jay Leno, Live with Regis and Kathie Lee, Late Night with David Letterman, and Good Morning America. For the international release in Europe, she conducted press interviews and performed "You're Still the One" on The National Lottery Live in the U.K. On February 26, 1998, Twain appeared on TNN's Prime Time Country. She sang songs from both The Woman In Me and Come On Over, and then Gary Chapman interviewed her. In March 1998, Twain embarked on a promotional tour in Australia. She appeared on Midday, Hey Hey It's Saturday Night, and performed at the Australian Grand Prix concert in Melbourne.

At the VH1 Divas concert on April 14, 1998, she sang "Man! I Feel Like a Woman!" and "You're Still the One." In September 1998, Twain became the first female country singer to appear on the cover of Rolling Stone magazine since Dolly Parton in 1980. She also performed at award shows, including the Canadian Country Music Awards, Country Music Association Awards, and Billboard Music Awards. Promotion continued throughout 1999, with Twain appearing again on The Tonight Show with Jay Leno and Prime Time Country. On February 24, 1999, Twain sang "Man! I Feel Like a Woman!" at the 41st Grammy Awards ceremony. She returned to the U.K. in July and September 1999 to perform at Capital Radio's Party in the Park and Top of the Pops, respectively. At the 1999 Country Music Association Awards, Twain performed "Come On Over." In the U.K., a Top of the Pops 2 special aired on BBC Two on December 8, 1999, where Twain sang "Man! I Feel Like a Woman!" and "That Don't Impress Me Much,” among other songs.

=== Singles ===
Out of the album's 16 songs, 12 were released as singles. In North America, promoters pushed Come On Over as a country album, while internationally categorizing it as pop. Promoters serviced the first two singles, "Love Gets Me Every Time" and "Don't Be Stupid (You Know I Love You)," only to country radio stations and both peaked within the top 40 of the U.S. Billboard Hot 100. The former was a five-week number one on the Hot Country Songs charts, while the latter was a top-ten hit on the same. "You're Still the One" had a crossover release to U.S. pop radio on January 13, 1998, and was the first single the team released in Europe on February 2, 1998. In addition to reaching number-one in Australia and on the U.S. Hot Country Songs chart, the song peaked at number two on the U.S. Billboard Hot 100, at number seven on the Canadian RPM Top Singles chart, and at number 10 on the UK Singles Chart. Mercury relied on a crossover marketing strategy for the following singles, sending songs to pop stations only after they achieved success on country stations. On May 4, 1998, Twain and Lange's team released "From This Moment On" to U.S. country stations as the fourth single, and it peaked at number six on the U.S. Hot Country Songs chart. They later serviced it to U.S. pop stations on August 25, 1998, and it peaked within the top 10 in Australia, the U.K., and the U.S.

"When" had a limited release in Europe on June 1, 1998. Twain released the original version of "That Don't Impress Me Much" to U.S. country stations on December 7, 1998, and released a dance remix (Note: Labeled as the "UK dance mix" on the revised international edition.) to U.S. pop stations on February 23, 1999. It was the album's most successful single internationally, topping the charts in Ireland, New Zealand, and Norway. It achieved top 10 positions in other territories, including Australia, Canada, Germany, Spain, the U.K., and the U.S. "You've Got a Way" and "Man! I Feel Like a Woman!" had crossover releases to U.S. pop stations throughout 1999, and peaked at numbers 49 and 23 respectively on the U.S. Billboard Hot 100. The promoters also serviced more singles to U.S. country stations: "Honey, I'm Home" (August 10, 1998), "Come On Over" (September 7, 1999), "Rock This Country!" (January 10, 2000), and "I'm Holdin' On to Love (To Save My Life)" (July 2000). All songs peaked within the top 30 of the U.S. Hot Country Songs chart, with "Honey, I'm Home" at number one and "Come On Over" at number six. They released a dance remix of "Don't Be Stupid (You Know I Love You)" as the album's final single in Europe on February 7, 2000.

=== Touring ===
To further promote the album, Twain embarked on the Come On Over Tour, her first as a headliner. It kicked off in Sudbury, Northern Ontario, on May 29, 1998, and concluded in West Palm Beach, Florida, on December 5, 1999. Outside North America, the Come On Over Tour visited Australia, Ireland, and the U.K. It grossed over $70 million from 165 shows and received generally positive reviews. Music critics appreciated Twain's energetic performances as she refuted those earlier accusations of being unable to sing live, and they praised the show's production. The tour visited Reunion Arena in Dallas, Texas, on September 12, 1998, and DirecTV broadcast it live. A CBS TV special titled Shania Twain's Winter Break premiered on March 3, 1999. Filmmakers documented the tour on January 15 and 16, 1999, at the Bayfront Park Amphitheater in Miami, Florida. Elton John joined Twain on stage to sing a medley of "You're Still the One" and "Something About the Way You Look Tonight" (1997). Backstreet Boys also appeared at the concert, singing "From This Moment On" alongside Twain. CBS taped a second TV special at Texas Stadium, and it aired on Thanksgiving Day, November 25, 1999.

== Critical reception ==
Professional ratings
Review scores
Source	Rating
AllMusic	5/5 stars
Chicago Tribune	1.5/4 stars
Christgau's Consumer Guide	A−
Entertainment Weekly	B+
Los Angeles Times	2/4 stars
The Philadelphia Inquirer	3/4 stars
Pitchfork	7.5/10
Rolling Stone	3/5 stars
The Rolling Stone Album Guide	4.5/5 stars
The Tennessean	3.5/5 stars

Come On Over received mixed reviews from music critics. Those who were complimentary applauded it for exploring the limits of country music. Stephen Thomas Erlewine from AllMusic remarked that Come On Over transcended boundaries due to its rock-oriented production, writing that despite the relative absence of country elements, Twain "sticks to what she does best, which is countrified mainstream pop." Billboard's Paul Verna similarly stated that "country's traditions are being reinvented and redefined," calling Come On Over "the future of power pop merging with country." Some critics, however, took issue with the album's genre classification as country. Robert Christgau asserted that Come On Over "has nothing to do with country," and Jeffrey Lee Puckett of The Courier-Journal felt that "[it] sounds more like a pop singer flirting with country." The Tennessean's Tom Roland added that the array of rock references hardly made the album sound country. Conversely, J. D. Considine of Entertainment Weekly cited the country chorus on "Honey, I'm Home" as an example of how "superficial Twain's rock trappings are," concluding that "Lange has no need to countrify every arrangement for credibility's sake."

Reviews in the Dayton Daily News, The Philadelphia Inquirer, the Vancouver Sun, and The Washington Post praised the album's mainstream appeal and catchy melodies, and touted Lange's production. Other reviews from The Atlanta Journal-Constitution, the Austin American-Statesman, the New York Daily News, and Q were negative, dismissing the album as "unforgivably bland," forgettable, and uninspired. Twain's lyrical content drew criticism for lacking depth, and some called it "predictable" (the Los Angeles Times) and "cliched" (the Springfield News-Leader). Hussey opined that Twain avoided controversy and was "the first to insist that her songs are meant to be fun, and it is OK to enjoy them on those terms alone." In the Miami Herald, Howard Cohen disliked the album's "lazy" production and "insipid" lyrics, but complimented the international version for removing "the forced country instrumentation" and revealing "the finely crafted pop it really is." The Sydney Morning Herald's Mary Tartaglione and The Guardian's Adam Sweeting were critical, deeming the international version's production "overly polished" and "manufactured."

=== Accolades ===
At the 1998 Canadian Country Music Association Awards, Come On Over won Album of the Year and was declared the Top Selling Album. It was nominated for Album of the Year at the 33rd Academy of Country Music Awards, the 1998 Country Music Association Awards, and the 1998 Juno Awards. The album received further nominations for Favorite Pop/Rock Album and Favorite Country Album at the 26th American Music Awards.

At the 41st Annual Grammy Awards in 1999, Come On Over received major recognition, earning nominations for Album of the Year and Best Country Album. Its lead single, “You're Still the One,” was nominated in the general field for both Record of the Year and Song of the Year, losing in both categories to Céline Dion’s “My Heart Will Go On”, while winning Best Female Country Vocal Performance and Best Country Song.

At the 42nd Annual Grammy Awards the following year, the album continued its success: “Man! I Feel Like a Woman!” won Best Female Country Vocal Performance, and “Come On Over” won Best Country Song. Additionally, “You’ve Got a Way” received a nomination for Song of the Year, bringing the album’s total Grammy nominations across the two ceremonies to nine, with four wins.

== Commercial performance ==
In 2015, Guinness World Records recognized Come On Over as the biggest-selling studio album by a female solo artist, with over 40 million copies sold worldwide. It remains the best-selling country album, the best-selling album by a Canadian artist, and the world's eighth best-selling album of all time.

=== Americas ===
In Canada, Come On Over debuted at number one on the Canadian Albums Chart with first-week sales of 51,840 copies. Twain became the first country artist to debut at number one since the introduction of the Nielsen SoundScan system for tracking album sales. The album spent five weeks atop the chart. By December 2014 it had sold 1.94 million copies, making it the best-selling album since the advent of the Nielsen SoundScan in Canada in 1995. Music Canada (MC) certified Come On Over double diamond for shipments of two million units. In the U.S., Come On Over debuted at number two on the Billboard 200 chart for November 22, 1997, with first-week sales of 172,000 copies. Mase's debut studio album Harlem World, which sold 3,000 more copies than Come On Over, held it off from reaching the top spot. The album remained second behind Barbra Streisand's Higher Ground, selling 170,000 units in the second week.

Come On Over experienced its highest weekly sales during Christmas week 1999, selling 355,000 copies. It spent 50 weeks at number one on the U.S. Top Country Albums chart, breaking the record for the longest-running number-one album. (Note: The record was later surpassed by Morgan Wallen's Dangerous: The Double Album (2021).) It was the fourth best-selling album of both 1998 and 1999 in the U.S., selling 4.9 million and 5.62 million copies, respectively. By October 2019, the album had sold 15.73 million pure copies in the U.S. It is the best-selling country album and the second best-selling album in the U.S. since Nielsen SoundScan tracking began in 1991, behind Metallica's 1991 self-titled album. The Recording Industry Association of America (RIAA) certified the album 20× platinum (double diamond), denoting 20 million units shipped. In Latin America, Come On Over was certified gold in Brazil, Mexico, and Uruguay and platinum in Argentina.

=== Europe and Oceania ===
The album topped the pancontinental European Top 100 Albums chart for two consecutive weeks. The International Federation of the Phonographic Industry (IFPI) certified it 7× platinum in 2001, denoting sales of seven million copies across Europe. Come On Over was a sleeper success in the U.K. In the week ending March 21, 1998, the album debuted at number 15 on the Albums Chart. After a year and a half of fluctuating on the chart, it climbed to number one in its 74th week, with sales of 57,000 copies. The best sales week was the one ending December 25, 1999, with 278,000 copies sold. Come On Over spent 11 weeks at number one and was the best-selling album of 1999 in the U.K. with sales of 2.2 million copies. The British Phonographic Industry (BPI) certified it 11× platinum and sold 3.51 million copies by January 2023, making it the 15th best-selling album in the U.K. of all time. Across Europe, Come On Over reached number one in Belgium (Flanders), Denmark, Iceland, Ireland, the Netherlands, Norway, and Scotland. It received multi-platinum certifications in Belgium, Sweden, Switzerland (3× platinum), the Netherlands (5× platinum), Norway (6× platinum), and Denmark (7× platinum).

In Australia, Come On Over topped the Australian Albums Chart for 20 weeks and was the best-selling album of 1999 in the country. By December 1999, the album had sold one million units in Australia. It was certified 25× platinum by the Australian Recording Industry Association (ARIA) for earning over 1.75 million album-equivalent units in the nation. The album spent 23 weeks at number one on the New Zealand Albums Chart and received a 21× platinum certification from Recorded Music NZ (RMNZ) for shipments of over 315,000 units.

== Legacy ==
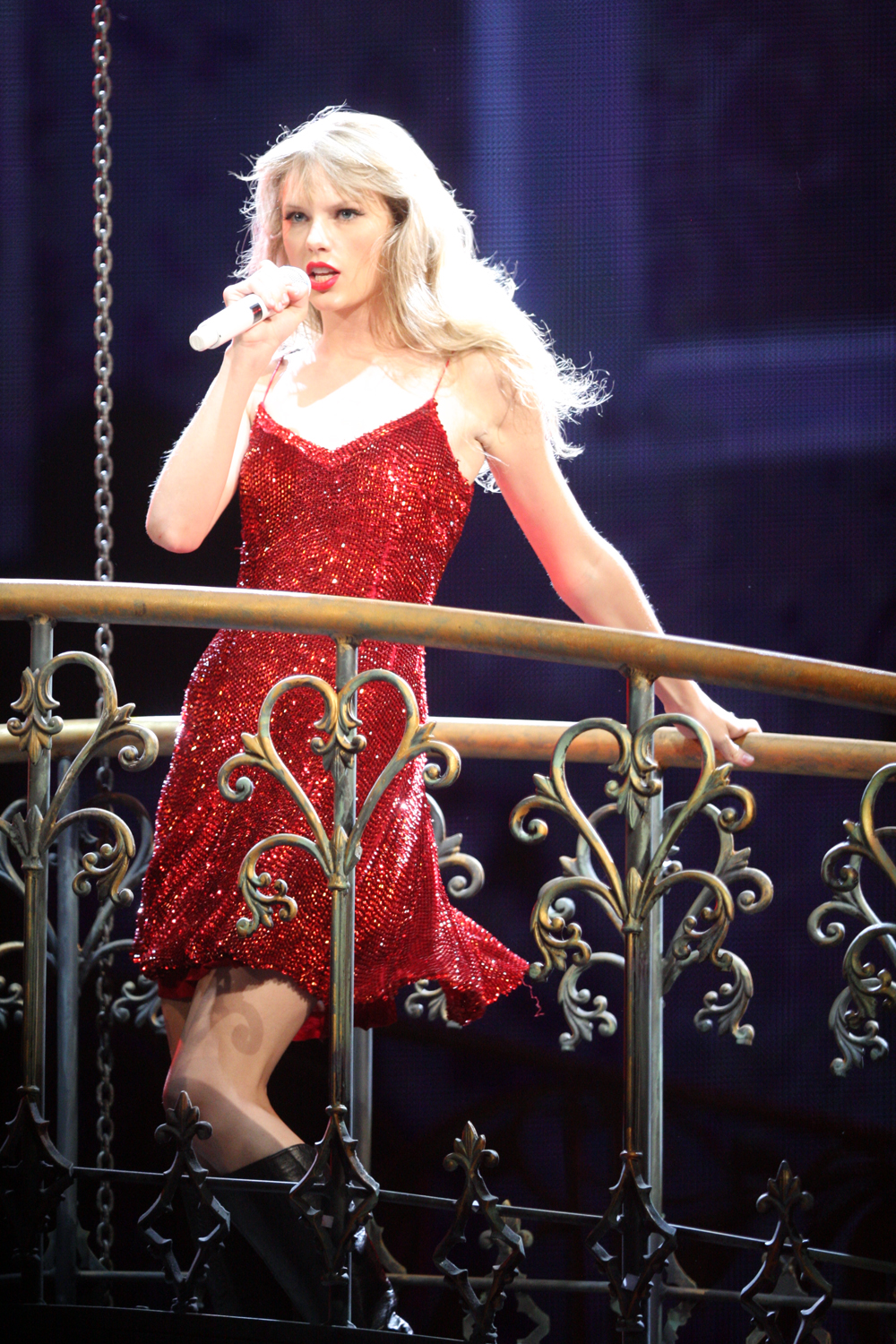
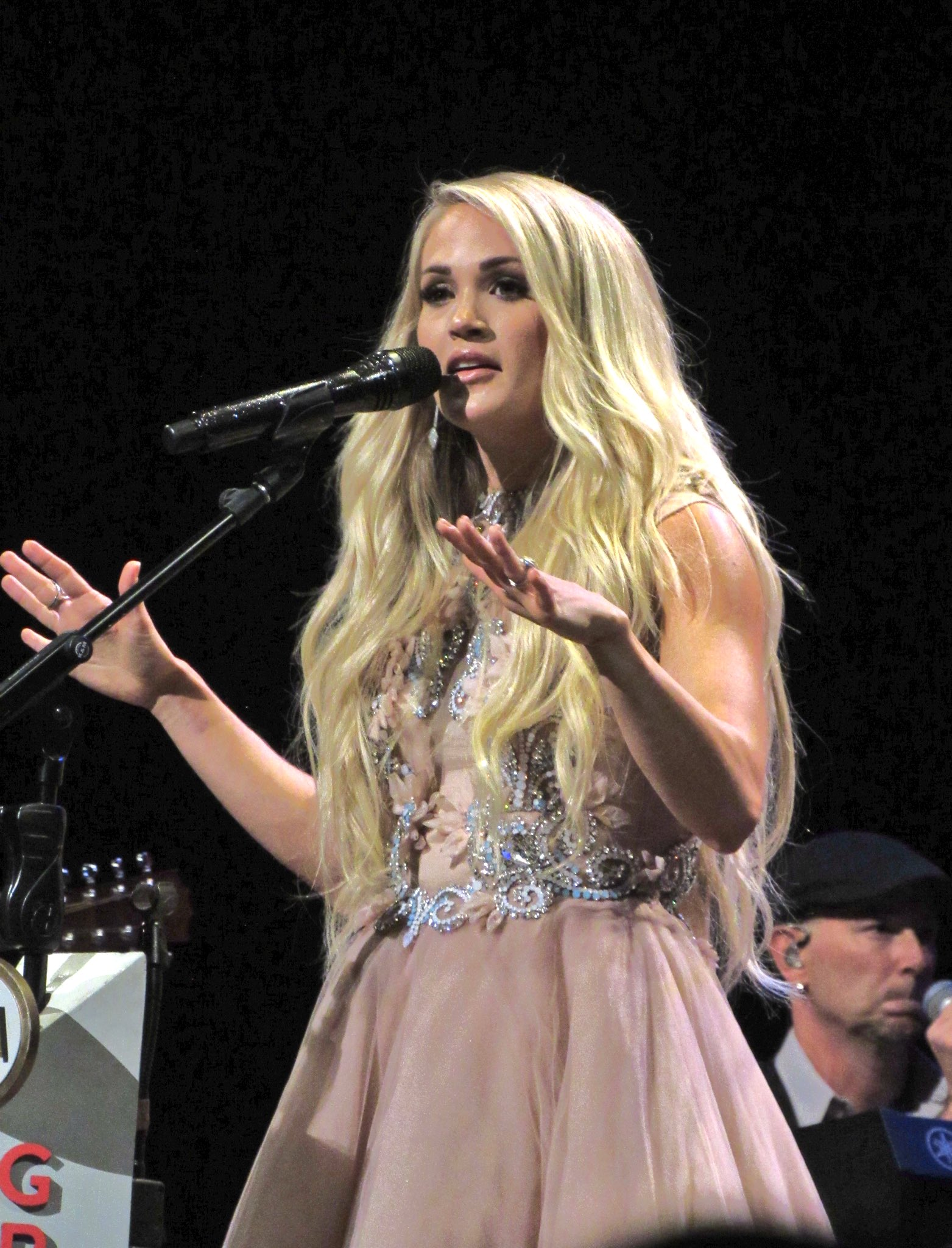
Critics have observed the impact of Come On Over on the work of later female country artists, including Taylor Swift (left, pictured in 2012) and Carrie Underwood (right, pictured in 2018).

In a March 1999 article in the Ottawa Citizen, Lynn Saxberg wrote that Come On Over "pushed new country as far as it will go" and "may be remembered as [...] the epitome of the pop-rock influence on country music." Ron Corbett from the same publication considered Twain's crossover success to be the first of its kind: "In Nashville, they say the streets are littered with the bones of artists who tried to cross over to pop, only to end up killing their careers. Ms. Twain may turn out to be the exception." In retrospect, journalists hailed Twain as the pioneer of 1990s country-pop crossovers and observed the impact of Come On Over in country music. Alex Hopper of American Songwriter considered the album to be Twain's magnum opus and said that its country-pop crossovers "were something entirely new upon their release." In Jocelyn R. Neal's 2013 book Country Music: A Cultural and Stylistic History, Neal acknowledged Twain as the driving force behind the "major stylistic shift in country music toward country-pop."

Larry Delaney of Country Music News said that the album introduced country music to a large and new audience of young listeners. Writing for Wide Open Country, Bobbie Jean Sawyer applauded the album for being "a benchmark moment for country music." He noted its impact on female country artists "less concerned with a strict adherence to genre and more concerned with being true to themselves," including Kelsea Ballerini, Maren Morris, Carly Pearce, Carrie Underwood, and Taylor Swift. Taylor Weatherby of Billboard called Come On Over "a brilliant fusion of country, pop and rock that it quickly solidified Twain's legacy." Alison Hussey of Pitchfork observed how the album's success "changed Nashville forever" and redefined the categorization of country music. According to her, Twain set a new standard of country-pop crossovers, recognizing her influence on subsequent careers of Bomshel, Rascal Flatts, Faith Hill, and Underwood.

Pandora music analyst Kevin Seal pointed out that the "euphoric quality" of the songs had a "huge effect on Nashville production" and shaped the sound of upcoming country productions. Medium's Glenn Peoples likewise dubbed the music "ahead of its time." He cited Underwood's "All-American Girl" (2007) and "Good Girl" (2012) as songs "that would work well on Come On Over," referring to the female empowerment theme of the former and the instrumentation of the latter. The Independent's Roisin O'Connor linked the "winking, sarcastic tone" of "That Don't Impress Me Much" to Taylor Swift's music, specifically citing "We Are Never Ever Getting Back Together" (2012) and "Blank Space" (2014), and concluding, "Without Shania, there likely wouldn't be a Taylor." In 2021, Swift thanked Twain on the video-sharing service TikTok for eradicating the misconception that "country girls can't go to pop." Twain told Billboard that the risk she took by exploring her diversity inspired female country artists like Swift and Miranda Lambert to be confident in being "artistically expressive and unique."

Journalists have noted that Twain's image and fashion throughout the album cycle altered the public's perception of country music's visual representation. (Note: Attributed to such sources as Medium, Pitchfork, The Province, and Wide Open Country.) Some have credited the visual aspect of Twain's music videos, which benefited from heavy airplay on stations such as CMT, MTV, and VH1, as conveying a message that "country music doesn't have to look like just one thing." Peoples described Twain's music videos as "visually stunning, mixing glamour, romanticism, and often vibrant colors." National Post's Jeff Breithaupt accredited the success of Come On Over to the marketing strategy of "slow roll-outs of hit singles and expensive videos," and compared it to Michael Jackson's Thriller (1982). Other journalists commented that a vast audience of "underseen, under-engaged" female listeners who identified with its female empowerment themes embraced it. (Note: Attributed to such sources as American Songwriter, The Independent, The Journal of Popular Culture, Ottawa Citizen, Pitchfork, The Rolling Stone Album Guide, and Vice.) O'Connor cited "Black Eyes, Blue Tears" and "If You Wanna Touch Her, Ask!" for their timely relevance in light of the #MeToo movement, calling the album "an overlooked feminist masterpiece."

Consequence ranked Come On Over as the ninth-best album of 1997, and praised it for pushing the boundaries of country music. The National Association of Recording Merchandisers (NARM), in conjunction with the Rock and Roll Hall of Fame, ranked the album at number 21 of the Definitive 200 Albums of All Time. Rolling Stone included it in their 2020 revised list of the 500 Greatest Albums of All Time, at number 300. The same publication later placed the album at number eight in its 2022 list of the "100 Greatest Country Albums of All Time." Editor Natalie Weiner found the songs "addictive," and commended both the "wild creativity" and Twain and Lange's "dangerously sharp commercial instincts," as well as their "fearless embrace of an audience too often overlooked by country music: women." In their ranking of the "150 Greatest Albums Made by Women," NPR listed Come On Over at number 89. Ann Powers opined that the album's sonic innovations were "forward thinking," revolutionizing the country genre.

== Track listing ==
All tracks are written by Shania Twain and Robert John "Mutt" Lange.

Come On Over – North American edition
No.	Title	Length
1.	"Man! I Feel Like a Woman!"	3:53
2.	"I'm Holdin' On to Love (To Save My Life)"	3:30
3.	"Love Gets Me Every Time"	3:33
4.	"Don't Be Stupid (You Know I Love You)"	3:35
5.	"From This Moment On" (with Bryan White)	4:43
6.	"Come On Over"	2:55
7.	"When"	3:39
8.	"Whatever You Do! Don't!"	3:49
9.	"If You Wanna Touch Her, Ask!"	4:04
10.	"You're Still the One"	3:34
11.	"Honey, I'm Home"	3:39
12.	"That Don't Impress Me Much"	3:38
13.	"Black Eyes, Blue Tears"	3:39
14.	"I Won't Leave You Lonely"	4:13
15.	"Rock This Country!"	4:23
16.	"You've Got a Way"	3:29
Total length:		60:08

Come On Over – Special edition
No.	Title	Length
17.	"You're Still the One" (featuring Chris Martin) (live from Las Vegas, 2022)	4:00
18.	"You're Still the One" (featuring Elton John) (live from Miami, 1999)	3:50
19.	"Party for Two" (featuring Nick Jonas) (live from Stagecoach, 2017)	4:24
Total length:		72:22

Come On Over – International edition
No.	Title	Length
1.	"You're Still the One"	3:33
2.	"When"	3:38
3.	"From This Moment On"	4:40
4.	"Black Eyes, Blue Tears"	3:37
5.	"I Won't Leave You Lonely"	4:07
6.	"I'm Holdin' On to Love (To Save My Life)"	3:27
7.	"Come On Over"	2:54
8.	"You've Got a Way"	3:15
9.	"Whatever You Do! Don't!"	3:49
10.	"Man! I Feel Like a Woman!"	3:54
11.	"Love Gets Me Every Time"	3:33
12.	"Don't Be Stupid (You Know I Love You)"	3:34
13.	"That Don't Impress Me Much"	3:38
14.	"Honey, I'm Home"	3:34
15.	"If You Wanna Touch Her, Ask!"	4:14
16.	"Rock This Country!"	4:26
Total length:		59:53

Come On Over – Australian special edition
No.	Title	Length
17.	"(If You're Not in It for Love) I'm Outta Here!" (live/Direct TV mix)	7:03
18.	"Love Gets Me Every Time" (dance mix)	4:42
19.	"Don't Be Stupid (You Know I Love You)" (extended dance mix)	4:44
Total length:		76:22

Come On Over – Special Asian edition (bonus disc)
No.	Title	Length
1.	"That Don't Impress Me Much" (south-east Asia mix; aka India/for video TV edit)	3:26
2.	"God Bless the Child" (single mix)	3:48
3.	"(If You're Not in It for Love) I'm Outta Here!" (live/Direct TV mix)	7:03
4.	"Medley" ("Home Ain't Where His Heart Is (Anymore),” "The Woman in Me,” "You've Got a Way"; live/Direct TV mix)	7:25
5.	"From This Moment On" (original U.S. version; a.k.a. country version)	4:43
6.	"Don't Be Stupid (You Know I Love You)" (extended dance mix)	4:44
Total length:		31:09

Come On Over – Australian Tour edition
No.	Title	Length
1.	"You're Still the One"	3:33
2.	"When"	3:38
3.	"From This Moment On" (the right mix)	4:52
4.	"Black Eyes, Blue Tears"	3:37
5.	"I Won't Leave You Lonely"	4:07
6.	"I'm Holdin' On to Love (To Save My Life)"	3:27
7.	"Come On Over"	2:54
8.	"You've Got a Way"	3:15
9.	"Whatever You Do! Don't!"	3:49
10.	"Man! I Feel Like a Woman!"	3:54
11.	"Love Gets Me Every Time"	3:33
12.	"Don't Be Stupid (You Know I Love You)"	3:34
13.	"That Don't Impress Me Much" (dance mix)	4:43
14.	"Honey, I'm Home"	3:34
15.	"If You Wanna Touch Her, Ask!"	4:14
16.	"Rock This Country!"	4:26
Total length:		60:58

Come On Over – Australian Tour edition (bonus disc)
No.	Title	Length
1.	"God Bless the Child" (single mix)	3:48
2.	"(If You're Not in It for Love) I'm Outta Here!" (live/Direct TV mix)	7:03
3.	"Medley" ("Home Ain't Where His Heart Is (Anymore),” "The Woman in Me,” "You've Got a Way")	7:25
4.	"From This Moment On" (original U.S. version; a.k.a. country version)	4:43
5.	"Love Gets Me Every Time" (dance mix)	4:42
6.	"Don't Be Stupid (You Know I Love You)" (extended dance mix)	4:44
Total length:		32:25

Come On Over – Japanese Limited edition
No.	Title	Length
1.	"You're Still the One" (radio edit)	3:15
2.	"When"	3:39
3.	"From This Moment On"	4:40
4.	"Black Eyes, Blue Tears"	3:34
5.	"I Won't Leave You Lonely"	4:06
6.	"I'm Holdin' On to Love (To Save My Life)"	3:26
7.	"Come On Over"	2:55
8.	"You've Got a Way"	3:18
9.	"Whatever You Do! Don't!"	3:43
10.	"Man! I Feel Like a Woman!"	3:54
11.	"Love Gets Me Every Time"	3:32
12.	"Don't Be Stupid (You Know I Love You)"	3:34
13.	"That Don't Impress Me Much"	3:38
14.	"Honey, I'm Home"	3:33
15.	"If You Wanna Touch Her, Ask!"	4:13
16.	"Rock This Country!"	4:21
17.	"Love Gets Me Every Time" (Mach 3 remix)	3:41
18.	"You're Still the One" (album version)	3:36
Total length:		66:38

Come On Over – International edition reissue
No.	Title	Length
1.	"You're Still the One"	3:33
2.	"When"	3:38
3.	"From This Moment On" (the right mix)	4:52
4.	"Black Eyes, Blue Tears"	3:37
5.	"I Won't Leave You Lonely"	4:07
6.	"I'm Holdin' On to Love (To Save My Life)"	3:27
7.	"Come On Over"	2:54
8.	"You've Got a Way" (Notting Hill remix)	3:25
9.	"Whatever You Do! Don't!"	3:49
10.	"Man! I Feel Like a Woman!"	3:54
11.	"Love Gets Me Every Time"	3:33
12.	"Don't Be Stupid (You Know I Love You)"	3:34
13.	"That Don't Impress Me Much" (UK dance mix)	3:59
14.	"Honey, I'm Home"	3:34
15.	"If You Wanna Touch Her, Ask!"	4:14
16.	"Rock This Country!"	4:26
Total length:		60:36

Notes:

- All editions of the album following its initial North American release include alternate pop-oriented mixes of all of the album's tracks, except for "Rock This Country!".

== Personnel ==
Credits are adapted from the album's liner notes.

Musicians

- Paul Leim – drums (all tracks)
- Joe Chemay – bass guitar, fretless bass (all tracks)
- Biff Watson – acoustic guitar, nylon-string guitar, electric guitar, rhythm guitar (all tracks)
- Dann Huff – electric guitar, rhythm guitar, guitar textures, talk box, electric 12-string guitar, wah-wah guitar, six-string bass, electric sitar (all tracks), guitar solo (track 1, 2, 5, 11, 13)
- Brent Mason – electric guitar licks (track 1–4, 7, 8, 11–13, 15), guitar solo (track 3, 7, 12)
- Michael Omartian – acoustic piano (track 5, 9)
- John Hobbs – acoustic piano (track 14), Wurlitzer (track 1, 9), organ (track 10)
- John Jarvis – acoustic piano (track 2, 3, 10, 13), Wurlitzer (track 4)
- Arthur Stead – organ (track 6, 7, 9), synthesizer (track 5, 16), acoustic piano (track 6)
- Paul Franklin – pedal steel (track 1–4, 7, 11–13, 15), "cosmic steel" (track 8), steel solo (track 8)
- Bruce Bouton – pedal steel (track 8, 10), steel solo (track 10), lap steel (track 9), lap steel solo (track 9)
- John Hughey – pedal steel (track 5, 6, 14)
- Eric Silver – mandolin (tracks 6, 7, 10)
- Joey Miskulin – accordion (track 6, 14)
- Larry Franklin – fiddle (track 4, 6, 8, 11, 15)
- Rob Hajacos – fiddle (track 3, 13)
- Stuart Duncan – fiddle (track 1)
- Larry Byrom – slide guitar (track 1, 11)
- Carl Marsh – strings, string arrangements (track 5)
- David Hamilton – strings, string arrangements (track 5)

"Bow Bros." gang fiddles on tracks 1, 3, 4, 8, 11, 13, 15 performed by Rob Hajacos, Joe Spivey, Glen Duncan, and Aubrey Haynie.

Production

- Shania Twain – vocals (all tracks)
- Robert John "Mutt" Lange – background vocals, producer (all tracks), remixing (track 1 on the Special Asia edition)
- Bryan White – duet vocals (track 5)
- Olle Romo – programming, Pro Tools, sequencing, editing, "that extra Swedish swing" (all tracks), engineer, additional engineer, mixing (track 4, 10, 13, 15 on international edition), remixing (track 6 on the Australian Tour and Special Asia editions)
- James Somberg – assistant programming
- Jay Alvarez – assistant programming
- Bjorn Thorsrud – pre-production programming
- Glenn Meadows – mastering
- Jeff Balding – engineer, additional engineer
- Mark Hagen – assistant engineer
- Bob Bullock – additional engineer
- Tim Waters – assistant engineer
- Mike Carroll – additional engineer
- Mark Stewart – assistant engineer
- Brian Tankersley – additional engineer, remixing (track 5 on the Australian Tour edition)
- Sandy Jenkins – assistant engineer
- Rob DeGroff – additional engineer, technical maintenance
- Mike Shipley – mixing (all tracks on standard edition, track 1–3, 5–9, 11, 12, 14 on international edition)
- George Holz – cover photography, colored photography
- Stacey Martin – hair, make-up
- Jamie Kimmelman – stylist
- Gus Phillipas – black and white photography
- Howard Fugler – hair
- Susan Sterling – make-up
- Wayne Scot Lukas – stylist

== Charts ==
=== Weekly charts ===
Weekly chart positions for Come On Over
Chart (1997–2022)	Peak position
Australian Albums (ARIA)	1
Austrian Albums (Ö3 Austria)	4
Belgian Albums (Ultratop Flanders)	1
Belgian Albums (Ultratop Wallonia)	4
Canada Top Albums/CDs (RPM)	1
Canadian Albums (Billboard)	1
Canadian Country Albums (RPM)	1
Danish Albums (Hitlisten)	1
Dutch Albums (Album Top 100)	1
European Albums (Top 100)	1
Finnish Albums (Suomen virallinen lista)	6
French Albums (SNEP)	4
German Albums (Offizielle Top 100)	8
Greek Albums (IFPI Greece)	57
Hungarian Albums (MAHASZ)	24
Icelandic Albums (Tónlist)	1
Irish Albums (IRMA)	1
Italian Albums (FIMI)	20
New Zealand Albums (RMNZ)	1
Norwegian Albums (VG-lista)	1
Portuguese Albums (AFP)	4
Scottish Albums (Official Charts)	1
Spanish Albums (PROMUSICAE)	12
Swedish Albums (Sverigetopplistan)	4
Swiss Albums (Schweizer Hitparade)	4
Taiwanese Albums (IFPI)	5
UK Albums (Official Charts)	1
UK Country Albums (Official Charts)	1
US Billboard 200	2
US Top Country Albums (Billboard)	1

=== Year-end charts ===
1997 year-end chart positions for Come On Over
Chart (1997)	Position
Canadian Albums (SoundScan)	16
Canadian Country Albums (RPM)	24
US Billboard 200	195
US Top Country Albums (Billboard)	25

1998 year-end chart positions for Come On Over
Chart (1998)	Position
Australian Albums (ARIA)	7
Canadian Albums (SoundScan)	7
Canadian Country Albums (RPM)	1
Dutch Albums (Album Top 100)	43
European Albums (Top 100)	98
New Zealand Albums (RMNZ)	21
Norwegian Russetid Period Albums (VG-lista)	14
UK Albums (OCC)	67
US Billboard 200	5
US Top Country Albums (Billboard)	2

1999 year-end chart positions for Come On Over
Chart (1999)	Position
Australian Albums (ARIA)	1
Austrian Albums (Ö3 Austria)	20
Belgian Albums (Ultratop Flanders)	2
Belgian Albums (Ultratop Wallonia)	65
Canada Top Albums/CDs (RPM)	3
Canadian Country Albums (RPM)	1
Danish Albums (Hitlisten)	3
Dutch Albums (Album Top 100)	3
European Albums (Top 100)	2
German Albums (Offizielle Top 100)	39
New Zealand Albums (RMNZ)	1
Norwegian Summer Period Albums (VG-lista)	1
Swedish Albums (Sverigetopplistan)	13
Swiss Albums (Schweizer Hitparade)	19
UK Albums (OCC)	1
US Billboard 200	3
US Top Country Albums (Billboard)	1

2000 year-end chart positions for Come On Over
Chart (2000)	Position
Australian Albums (ARIA)	46
Belgian Albums (Ultratop Flanders)	21
Belgian Albums (Ultratop Wallonia)	18
Canadian Albums (Nielsen SoundScan)	32
Danish Albums (Hitlisten)	72
Dutch Albums (Album Top 100)	41
European Albums (Top 100)	10
Finnish Foreign Albums (Suomen virallinen lista)	30
French Albums (SNEP)	9
German Albums (Offizielle Top 100)	98
New Zealand Albums (RMNZ)	35
Norwegian Winter Period Albums (VG-lista)	10
Swedish Albums (Sverigetopplistan)	33
Swiss Albums (Schweizer Hitparade)	20
UK Albums (OCC)	20
US Billboard 200	20
US Top Country Albums (Billboard)	3

2001 year-end chart positions for Come On Over
Chart (2001)	Position
Canadian Albums (Nielsen SoundScan)	147
Canadian Country Albums (Nielsen SoundScan)	10
French Albums (SNEP)	100
UK Albums (OCC)	164
US Top Pop Catalog Albums (Billboard)	4

2002 year-end chart positions for Come On Over
Chart (2002)	Position
Canadian Albums (Nielsen SoundScan)	171
Canadian Country Albums (Nielsen SoundScan)	12
UK Albums (OCC)	145
US Top Pop Catalog Albums (Billboard)	14

2003 year-end chart positions for Come On Over
Chart (2003)	Position
US Top Pop Catalog Albums (Billboard)	15

2004 year-end chart positions for Come On Over
Chart (2004)	Position
US Top Pop Catalog Albums (Billboard)	13

2023 year-end chart positions for Come On Over
Chart (2023)	Position
Australian Country Albums (ARIA)	50

2024 year-end chart positions for Come On Over
Chart (2024)	Position
Australian Country Albums (ARIA)	34

2025 year-end chart positions for Come On Over
Chart (2025)	Position
Australian Country Albums (ARIA)	47

=== Decade-end charts ===
1990s decade-end chart positions for Come On Over
Chart (1990–1999)	Position
US Billboard 200	3

2000s decade-end chart positions for Come On Over
Chart (2000–2009)	Position
US Billboard 200	158

=== All-time charts ===
All-time chart positions for Come On Over
Chart	Position
Canadian Artists Albums (SoundScan)	1
Irish Female Albums (IRMA)	7
UK Albums (OCC)	15
US Billboard 200	14
US Billboard 200 (Women)	8
US Top Country Albums (Billboard)	1

== Certifications and sales ==
Certifications for Come On Over
Region	Certification	Certified units/sales
Argentina (CAPIF)	Platinum	60,000^{^}
Australia (ARIA)	25× Platinum	1,750,000^{‡}
Austria (IFPI Austria)	Gold	25,000^{*}
Belgium (BRMA)	3× Platinum	150,000^{*}
Brazil (Pro-Música Brasil)	Gold	100,000^{*}
Canada (Music Canada)	2× Diamond	1,948,000
Denmark (IFPI Danmark)	7× Platinum	140,000^{‡}
Finland (Musiikkituottajat)	Gold	38,958
France (SNEP)	Platinum	300,000^{*}
Germany (BVMI)	3× Gold	750,000^{^}
Japan (RIAJ)	Gold	100,000^{^}
Mexico (AMPROFON)	Gold	100,000^{^}
Netherlands (NVPI)	5× Platinum	500,000^{^}
New Zealand (RMNZ)	21× Platinum	315,000^{^}
Norway (IFPI Norway)	6× Platinum	300,000^{*}
South Africa (RISA)	4× Platinum	200,000^{*}
Spain (Promusicae)	Platinum	100,000^{^}
Sweden (GLF)	3× Platinum	240,000^{^}
Switzerland (IFPI Switzerland)	3× Platinum	150,000^{^}
United Kingdom (BPI)	12× Platinum	3,517,003
United States (RIAA)	2× Diamond	15,730,000
Uruguay (CUD)	Gold	3,000^{^}
Summaries
Europe (IFPI)	7× Platinum	7,000,000^{*}
Worldwide	—	40,000,000
^{*} Sales figures based on certification alone.^{^} Shipments figures based on certification alone.^{‡} Sales+streaming figures based on certification alone.

== Release history ==
Release formats for Come On Over
Region	Date	Edition	Format	Label	Ref.
Canada	November 4, 1997	Standard	CD; cassette	Mercury	
United States	November 4, 1997	Standard	CD; cassette	Mercury	
Australia	1998	Australian special	CD	Mercury	
Australia	1998	Australian Tour	CD	Mercury	
Europe	February 16, 1998	International	CD; cassette	Mercury	
Netherlands	March 9, 1998	International	CD	Mercury	
United Kingdom	March 9, 1998	International	CD	Mercury	
France	June 16, 1998	International	CD	Mercury	
Asia	1999	Special Asia	CD	Mercury	
Various	1999	Revised international	CD; cassette	Mercury	
Germany	July 5, 1999	Revised international	CD	Mercury	
Switzerland	July 5, 1999	Revised international	CD	Mercury	
Japan	November 13, 1999	Japanese Limited	CD	Mercury	
United States	November 23, 1999	International	CD	Mercury	
Various	December 2, 2016	Standard	LP	Mercury	
Various	December 4, 2022	Special	Digital download; streaming	Mercury	

== See also ==
- List of best-selling albums
- List of best-selling albums by country
- List of best-selling albums by women
- List of best-selling albums in Australia
- List of best-selling albums in Belgium
- List of best-selling albums in Canada
- List of best-selling albums in Europe
- List of best-selling albums in the Netherlands
- List of best-selling albums in New Zealand
- List of best-selling albums in the United Kingdom
- List of best-selling albums in the United States
- List of best-selling albums in the United States of the Nielsen SoundScan era
- List of diamond-certified albums in Canada

== Bibliography ==
- Brown, Jim (2000). Shania Twain: Still the One. Quarry Press Inc. ISBN 1-55082-269-1. Archived from the original on March 30, 2023 – via Google Books.
- Carlin, Richard (2019). Country Music: A Very Short Introduction. Oxford University Press. ISBN 978-0-1909-0284-1. Archived from the original on April 7, 2023 – via Google Books.
- Williams, Dallas (1997). Shania Twain: On My Way. ECW Press. ISBN 1-55022-297X. Archived from the original on March 30, 2023 – via Google Books.
- Dickerson, James L. (2005). Go, girl, go!: the women's revolution in music. Schirmer Trade Books. ISBN 0-8256-7316-X. OL 8165296M.
- Eggar, Robin (2001). Shania Twain: The Biography. Headline Publishing Group. ISBN 0-7472-4786-2. OL 7959949M.
- Gray, Scott (1998). On Her Way: The Shania Twain Story. Ballantine Books. ISBN 0-345-42936-2. OL 24875827M.
- Hager, Barbara (1998). On Her Way: The Life and Music of Shania Twain. Berkley Books. ISBN 0-425-16451-9. OL 68343M.
- Mandrell, James (2014). "Shania Twain Shakes Up Country Music". The Journal of Popular Culture. 47 (5): 1015–1029. doi:10.1111/jpcu.12186. ISSN 1540-5931.
- McCall, Michael (1999). Shania Twain. St. Martin's Press. ISBN 0-312-20673-9. OL 21916846M.
- Neal, Jocelyn R. (2013). Country Music: A Cultural and Stylistic History. Oxford University Press. ISBN 978-0-19-973059-9. OL 25173613M.
- Kemp, Rob (2004). Brackett, Nathan; Hoard, Christian (eds.). The Rolling Stone Album Guide (4th ed.). Simon & Schuster. ISBN 0-7432-0169-8. OL 17734447W.
- Mersereau, Bob (2007). The Top 100 Canadian Albums. Goose Lane Editions. ISBN 978-0-86492-500-8. OL 25379028M.
- Twain, Shania (2011). From This Moment On. Atria Publishing Group. ISBN 978-1-4516-2074-0. OL 25077206M.
- Shuker, Roy (2013). Understanding Popular Music Culture (4th ed.). Routledge. ISBN 978-0-415-51713-3. Archived from the original on March 30, 2023 – via Google Books.
