= Hollinger Park =

Municipal park in Timmins, Ontario, Canada

Coordinates: 48.4756°N 81.3205°W

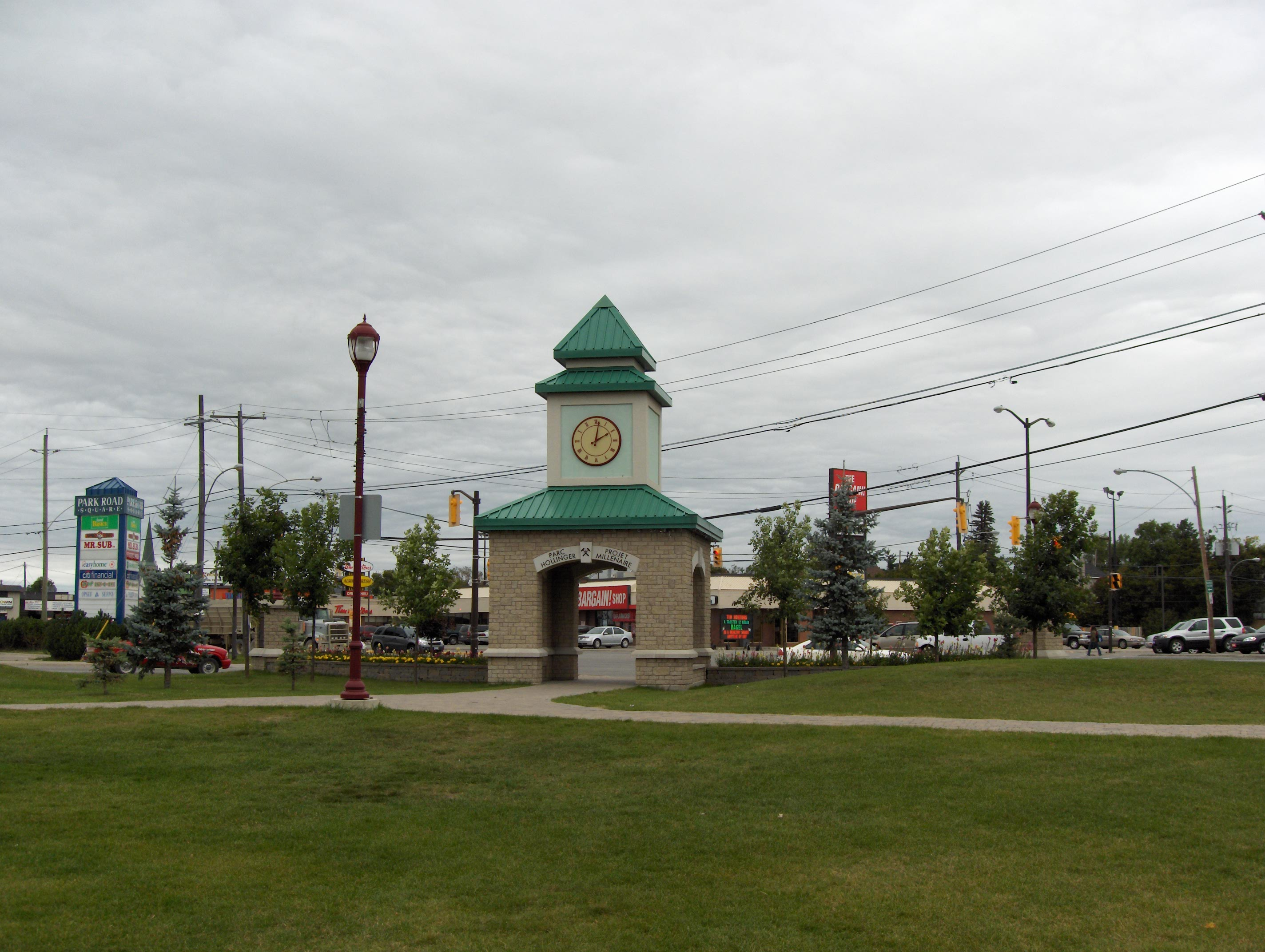
- Hollinger Park clock tower
- Interactive map of Hollinger Park
- Type: Municipal park
- Location: 565 Algonquin Boulevard East; Timmins, Ontario, Canada; P4N 1B7

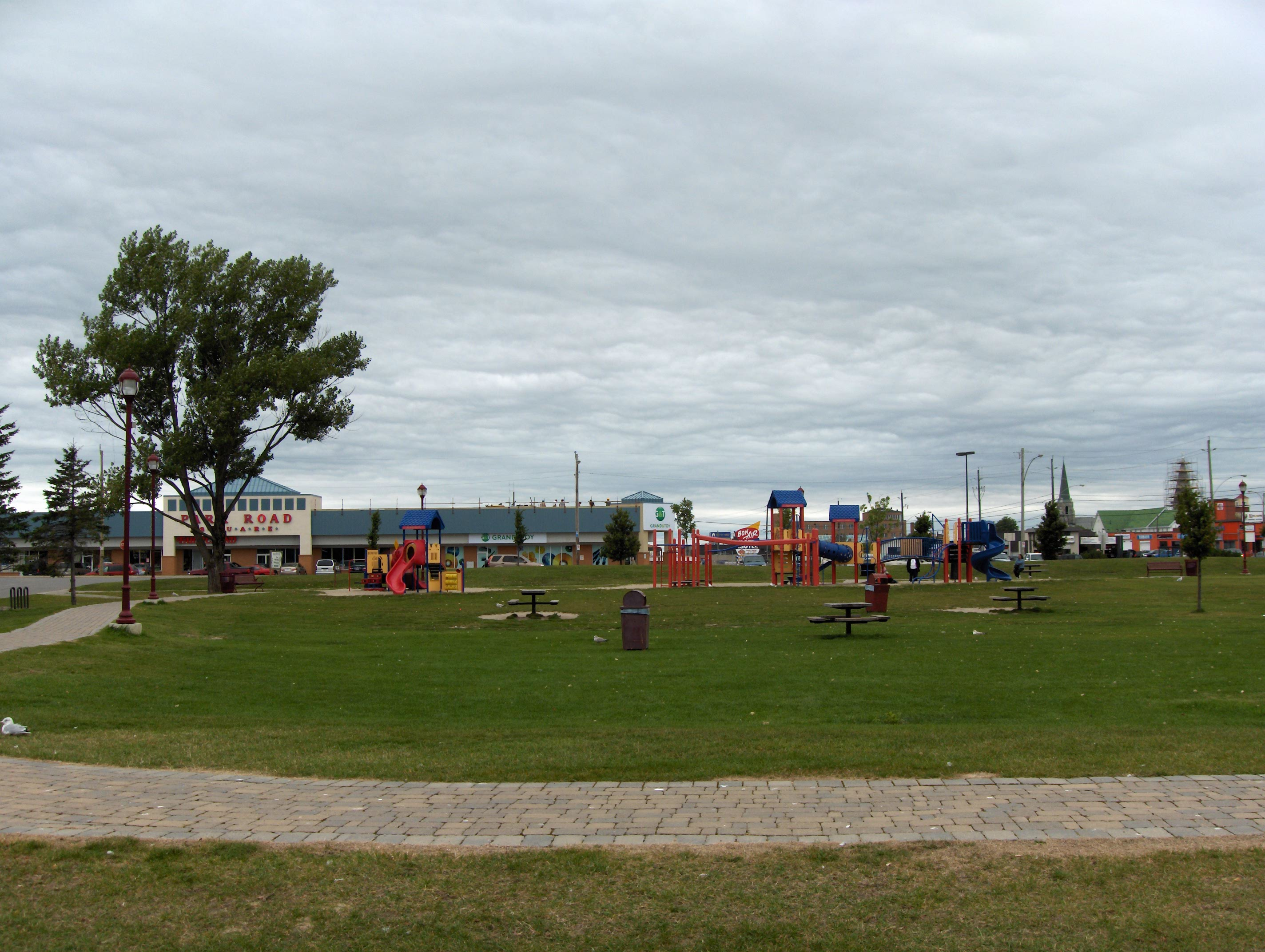
Holliger Park Playground Area

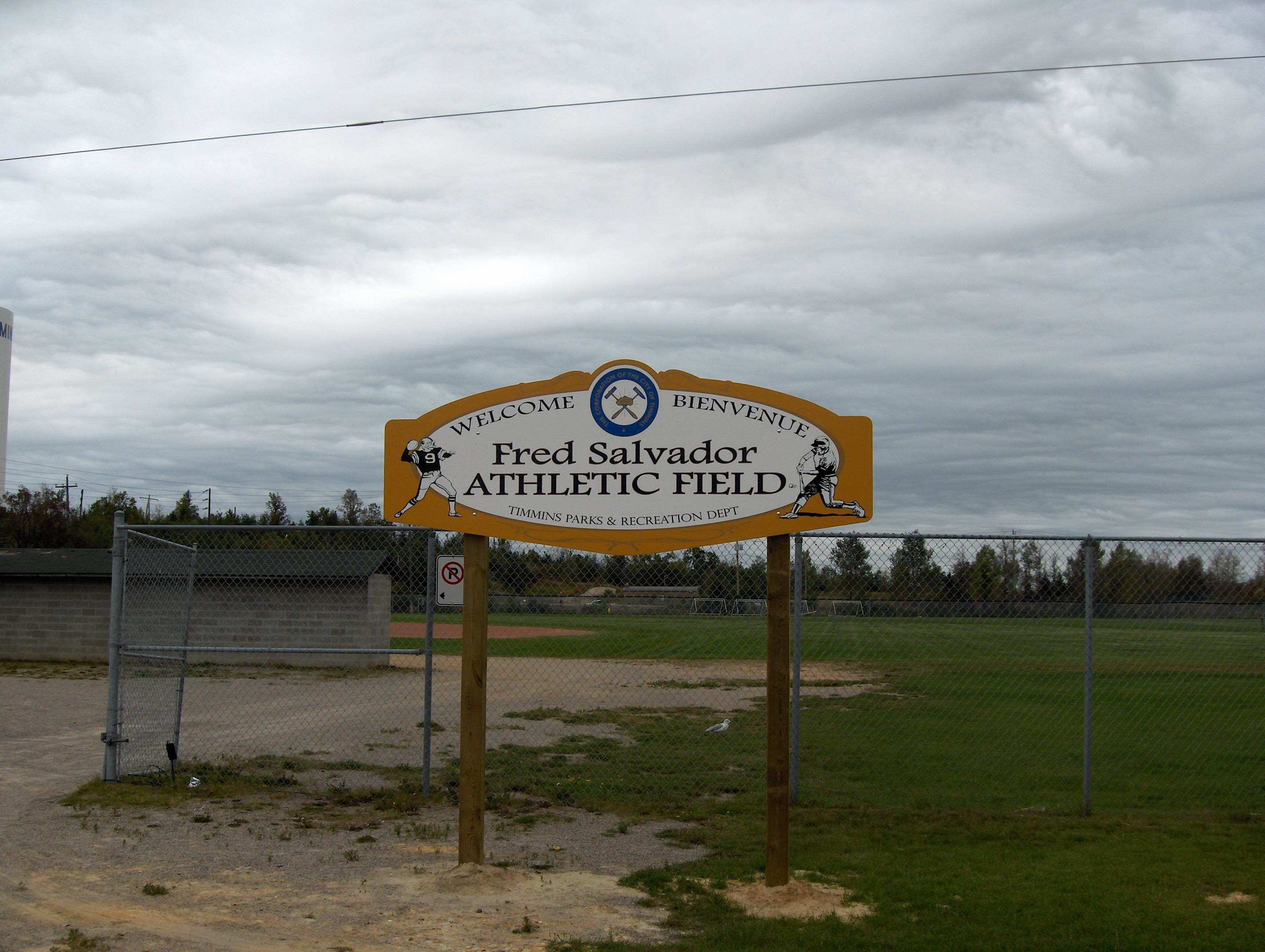
Fred Salvador Athletic Field

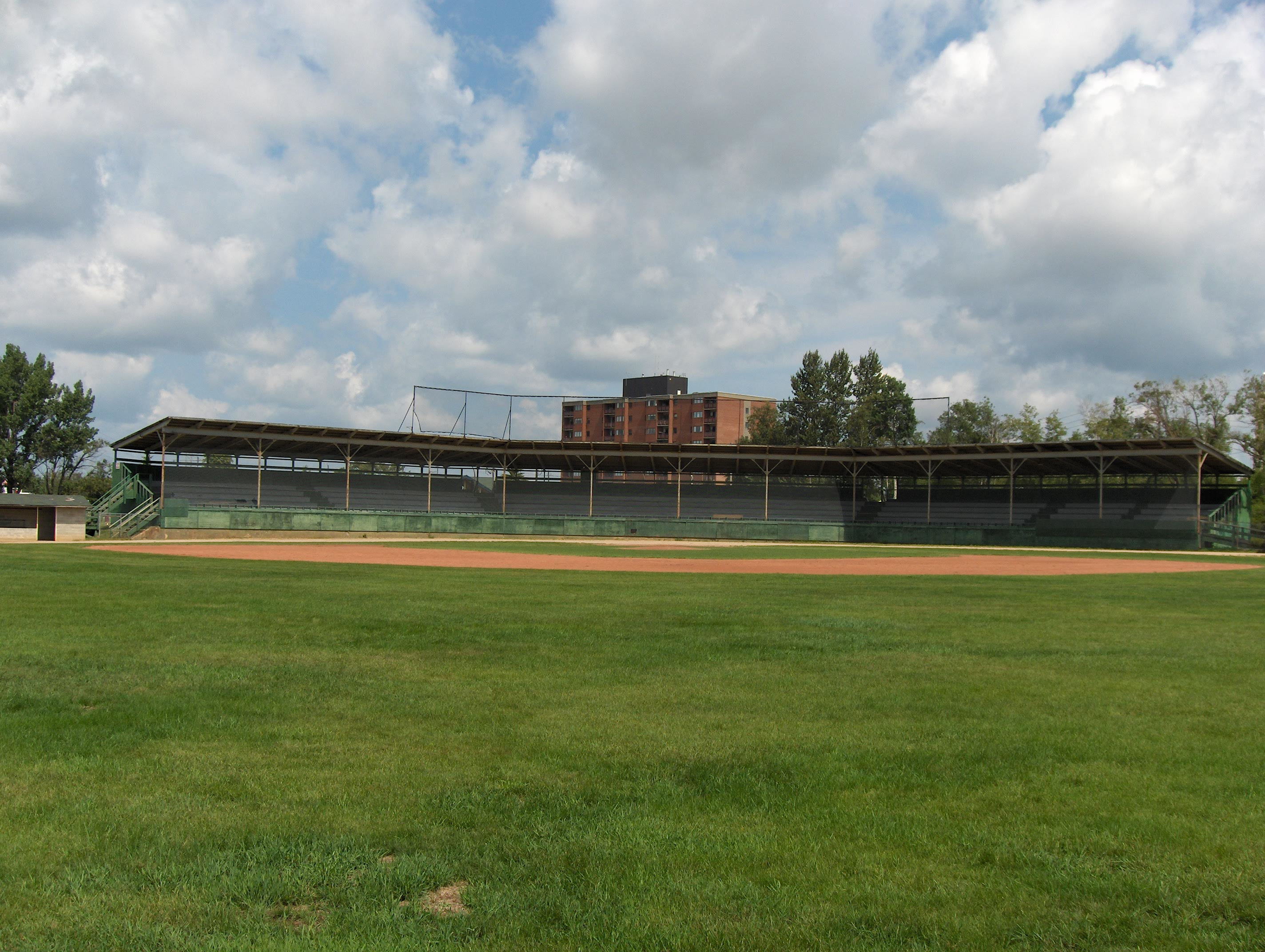
Ball Field Grandstands

Hollinger Park is a municipal park in Timmins, Ontario, located at the southeast corner of Algonquin Blvd. and Brunette Road (formerly Park Road).

The park is located on the site of what was once Miller Lake. The Hollinger Mine backfilled the lake with mine tailings and it was eventually beautified into one of the City's finest parks.

The park is named after Benny Hollinger, a mining prospector whose major 1909 gold discovery further launched the Porcupine Camp's early gold rush and the city's mining viability.

The park, approximately one square kilometre in size, includes a regulation size baseball diamond, two soccer fields and a beach volleyball pitch. It has been home to the Timmins Men's Baseball League since 1985. Timmins native Shania Twain performed at Hollinger Park on July 1, 1999 during her Come on Over Tour. Other sporting and musical events have been held in the park. In 2000, the Royal Canadian Mounted Police Musical Ride held a show in the park.

In 1999, a large renovation of the park was started as a millennium project. A water park, a clock tower, new playground equipment and a bandstand were erected in the newly renovated park. New trees were also planted following a large windstorm in July 1999 which knocked down many of the large willow trees that had graced the park for many years.

In August 2007, the athletic grounds at Hollinger Park, the city's centrepiece recreational field, was named the "Fred Salvador Athletic Field" in honour of Fred Salvador, Sr., who served with the city's parks and recreation department for 37 years.

In 2019 work began on the Hollinger Park Beautification Project. “Key elements in the park include an upgraded splash pad, accessible playground, an elaborate central plaza space (slated for completion in the spring/summer of 2020) and a linked trail network traversing the park. Part of this trail system will be used for an outdoor skating path during the winter months. Skating opportunities will be provided for during the 2019/2020 winter season. Other important upgrades include a new paved driveway/parking area (slated for completion in the spring/summer of 2020) and the reconstruction of the historic Hollinger Grandstands facility.”
