= You've Got a Way =

1999 single by Shania Twain

Single by Shania Twain

from the album Come On Over
- Released: June 1999
- Studio: Glenn Gould (Toronto, Canada); Masterfonics (Nashville, Tennessee)
- Length: 3:24
- Label: Mercury Nashville
- Songwriters: Robert John "Mutt" Lange; Shania Twain
- Producer: Robert John "Mutt" Lange

Shania Twain singles chronology
"Man! I Feel Like a Woman!" (1999)	"You've Got a Way" (1999)	"Come On Over" (1999)

Music video
- "You’ve Got a Way" on YouTube

"You've Got a Way" is a song by Canadian singer Shania Twain. It was released in June 1999 as the ninth single from her third studio album, Come on Over. It was also the fourth single released to adult contemporary radio and fifth to Oceania. It was written by Robert John "Mutt" Lange and Twain. The song was also remixed and used for the film Notting Hill. "You've Got a Way" was included on the Come on Over Tour in a medley with two ballads from her second studio album, The Woman in Me. "You've Got a Way" was nominated for Song of the Year at the 42nd Grammy Awards. As of January 2025, "You've Got a Way" has received over 100 million streams across YouTube and Spotify.

== Critical reception ==
Billboard magazine reviewed the single favorably, calling it hooky and "wedding-ready," though they wrote that it is less captivating than several of her prior songs.

== Chart performance ==
"You've Got a Way" debuted on the Billboard Hot Country Singles & Tracks chart the week of June 19, 1999, at number 61, the highest debut of the week. The single spent 20 weeks on the chart and climbed to a peak position of number 13 on August 14, 1999, where it remained for one week. "You've Got a Way" became Twain's first song off Come on Over to miss the top ten on the country charts; however, it did become her 14th (eighth consecutive) top 20 single.

On adult contemporary radio, "You've Got a Way" debuted at number 28 the week of July 31, 1999, the highest debut of the week. The single spent 26 weeks on the chart and quickly climbed to a peak position of number six on September 11, 1999, where it remained for one week. "You've Got a Way" became Twain's fourth consecutive top ten and top 20 single. On the Hot 100, "You've Got a Way" peaked at number 49, and reached 42 on the Hot 100 Airplay chart.

== Music video ==
The music video for "You've Got a Way" was shot in Los Angeles and directed by Paul Boyd. It was filmed on May 2 and debuted on May 24, 1999, on CMT. The video has a springtime feel, with Twain in a flower dress, walking around a garden, which at the end of the video is revealed to only be a music video set. Videos were released with both the 'Original Album Version' and the 'Notting Hill Remix' and each with either scenes from Notting Hill or just of Twain, called the Performance Only Version. The 'Notting Hill Remix' (Performance Only) version of the video is available on Twain's compilations Come On Over: Video Collection (1999) and The Platinum Collection (2001). After the video shoot, Twain donated the flower dress to the Shania Twain Centre, in her hometown of Timmins, Ontario.

== Track listings ==
Australian CD single

1. "You've Got a Way" (Notting Hill Mix) – 3:25
2. "Man! I Feel Like a Woman!" (live/Direct TV mix) – 4:04
3. "Come On Over" (live/Direct TV mix) – 3:07
4. "From This Moment On" (original US country version) – 4:43
5. "You've Got a Way" (Love to Infinity radio mix) – 4:00

Japanese CD maxi

1. "You've Got a Way" (Notting Hill remix) – 3:25
2. "Black Eyes, Blue Tears" (live/Direct TV mix) – 4:22
3. "You're Still the One" (Kano dub) – 7:46
4. "You've Got a Way" – 3:15

== Charts ==
=== Weekly charts ===
Chart (1999)	Peak position
Australia (ARIA)	28
Canada Top Singles (RPM)	17
Canada Adult Contemporary (RPM)	6
Canada Country Singles (RPM)	1
Canada CHR (Nielsen BDS)	14
New Zealand (Recorded Music NZ)	17
US Billboard Hot 100	49
US Adult Contemporary (Billboard)	6
US Hot Country Songs (Billboard)	13
US CHR/Pop Top 50 (Radio & Records)	40

=== Year-end charts ===
Chart (1999)	Position
Australia (ARIA)	91
Canada Adult Contemporary (RPM)	12
Canada Country Tracks (RPM)	2
US Hot Country Singles & Tracks (Billboard)	67

== Release history ==
Region	Date	Format(s)	Label(s)	Ref.
United States	June 1999	Country radio	Mercury Nashville	
United States	July 12, 1999	Adult contemporary; hot adult contemporary; modern adult contemporary radio	Mercury Nashville	
United States	July 13, 1999	Contemporary hit radio	Mercury Nashville	
Japan	August 18, 1999	CD	Mercury	
