= Come On Over (Shania Twain song) =

1999 single by Shania Twain

Single by Shania Twain

from the album Come On Over
- B-side: "Man! I Feel Like a Woman!"
- Released: September 7, 1999
- Studio: Masterfonics (Nashville, Tennessee)
- Length: 2:55
- Label: Mercury Nashville
- Songwriters: Robert John "Mutt" Lange; Shania Twain
- Producer: Robert John "Mutt" Lange

Shania Twain singles chronology
"You've Got a Way" (1999)	"Come On Over" (1999)	"Rock This Country!" (2000)

Live video
- "Come On Over" (live) on YouTube

"Come On Over" is a song co-written and performed by Canadian country music singer Shania Twain. It was the tenth single and title track from her third studio album Come On Over (1997). It was written by Twain and her then-husband, Robert John "Mutt" Lange. "Come On Over" was originally released to North American country radio stations in September 1999. The song went on to win a Grammy Award for Best Country Song in 2000. "Come On Over" was included in the setlists of the Come On Over Tour, Now Tour and in a medley for the Up! Tour; it was also performed at the CMAs on September 29, 1999.

== Composition ==
The song is performed in the key of E major with a tempo of 76 beats per minute in common time. The key changes to F major for the second verse and second chorus, followed by F♯ major for the remainder of the song. The chords alternate between perfect fourths (E–A, F–B♭, and F♯–B, respectively). Twain's vocals span from B_{3} to F♯_{5} in the song.

== Critical reception ==
Billboard magazine reviewed the song favorably saying "It's a cheerful little message of survival and empowerment all wrapped up in a tasty musical package", and predicted "in a career that shows no sign of losing momentum, this is the next sure hit."

== Music video ==
The music video for "Come on Over" was taken directly from Twain's 1999 Live special from Dallas. It was filmed on September 12, 1998, and released over a year later on October 6, 1999. Directing credit is given to Larry Jordan. This video was the second live video released from the Come on Over album, following "Honey, I'm Home". The next video released after "Come on Over" was "Rock This Country!" which was also taken from a concert special. The video is available on Twain's compilations Come On Over: Video Collection (1999) and The Platinum Collection (2001).

== Chart performance ==
"Come on Over" debuted on the Billboard Hot Country Singles & Tracks chart the week of September 11, 1999, at number 52, the highest debut of the week. The single spent 20 weeks on the chart and climbed to a peak position of number six on December 4, 1999, where it remained for two weeks. "Come on Over" became the eighth top ten single from Come on Over, her 12th in all, as well as her 15th (ninth consecutive) overall top 20 single. On the Billboard Hot 100, the song peaked at number 58, though reached number 43 on the Hot 100 Airplay chart. In Canada, "Come on Over" debuted at number one on the RPM Country Singles Chart.

== Charts ==
=== Weekly charts ===
Chart (1999)	Peak position
Canada (Nielsen SoundScan)	19
Canada Country Singles (RPM)	1
US Billboard Hot 100	58
US Hot Country Songs (Billboard)	6

=== Year-end charts ===
Chart (1999)	Position
Canada Country Tracks (RPM)	38
