= Richard Carlin =

American music writer and concertina player

- Occupation: Author
- Writing career
- Years active: 1975-present

Richard Carlin is the author of several books on folk, country, and traditional music. He plays English concertina.

== Writing ==
Carlin worked for Folkways Records as an independent producer from 1975 to 1980, before becoming an editor for Music at Pearson Prentice Hall. In 2008, Carlin published Worlds of Sound: The Story of Smithsonian Folkways. In 2016, he published Godfather of the Music Business, which is a biography of Morris Levy.

Carlin lives in Glen Ridge, New Jersey.

== Bibliography ==
- Worlds of Sound: The Story of Smithsonian Folkways, 2008 ISBN 0061563552
- Godfather of the Music Business: Morris Levy, 2016 ISBN 1496805704

== Discography ==
- In Come A Bumblebee (Folkways Records, 1977)
- The Poppy Leaf - English Concertina Tunes (Folkways Records, 1978)
