= From This Moment On (Shania Twain song) =

1998 single by Shania Twain

Single by Shania Twain

from the album Come On Over
- B-side: "You're Still the One"; "Don't Be Stupid (You Know I Love You)"
- Released: May 4, 1998
- Studio: Masterfonics (Nashville, Tennessee)
- Genre: Country pop
- Length: 4:01
- Label: Mercury
- Songwriters: Shania Twain; Robert John "Mutt" Lange
- Producer: Robert John "Mutt" Lange

Shania Twain singles chronology
| "You're Still the One" (1998) | "From This Moment On" (1998) | "When" (1998) |

Music video
- "From This Moment On" on YouTube

"From This Moment On" is a song by Canadian singer Shania Twain. It was released as the fourth single from her third studio album, Come On Over (1997). The song was written by Twain, with additional production and songwriting by Robert John "Mutt" Lange. Twain has performed "From This Moment On" on every one of her tours. Both a duet with country singer Bryan White as well as a solo version were released.

"From This Moment On" is a country pop track that received generally favourable reviews from music critics, who deemed the song as one of the highlights on the album. The song achieved commercial success, reaching number two in Australia, number seven in New Zealand, number four in Canada and the United States, and number nine in the United Kingdom. The song also charted in France, the Netherlands, and Sweden, as well as on several US Billboard charts.

An accompanying music video, directed by Paul Boyd, depicts Twain walking down a hallway alone in a dress, and then toward the end of the video, she appears with a symphony orchestra to perform the remainder of the song.

== Background and composition ==
I'd never actually collaborated, as far as a duet, with anybody before, so it became a lot of fun. They let me do exactly what I wanted to do, and I think we blended real well together. I got to work out all kinds of different arrangement things with them.

— Bryan White reflects on the duet.

"From This Moment On" was written during a soccer game in Italy. Twain once explained, "We were in Italy at a soccer game. My husband loves sports. I don't know the game that well, so my mind drifted and I started writing." Initially, Twain thought that "From This Moment On" would be perfect for fellow Canadian singer Celine Dion; however, as Twain and her husband at the time, Robert John "Mutt" Lange, developed the song, he convinced her to keep it for herself, and they concluded that it would work best as a duet. While their first choice for the duet was Elton John, they chose country singer Bryan White. Twain later described White as "the best male voice in country music. Beyond country music! He's an excellent singer. So he needed to be on this record, because the song soars. It demands that. It demands dynamics." White explained that, by the time he went to the recording, the song was mostly finalized, and described it as 'extremely challenging' vocally.

Initial first-run pressings of the international version of the Come On Over album during March 1998 featured White on the song, while subsequent pressings began featuring the song as a solo recording. In early 1998, Mercury executives were informed that White would be unable to promote the song alongside Twain; therefore, Twain had to return to the studio to re-record White's parts on her own. According to White's spokesman at Asylum Records, "We've certainly heard knocking on our door about "From This Moment On" being too contemporary for Bryan's sake; therefore, it is fine if they want to go to the Top 40 without him." White later claimed that he had no hard feelings towards Twain for him being excluded from the international version of the song, stating, "They're releasing this song as a pop record, and I'm not a pop artist, so my feelings aren't hurt."

"From This Moment On" was released as the fourth single from Come On Over on May 4, 1998, in the United States while being released in Australia on August 10, 1998, and in the United Kingdom on November 16, 1998. Musically, "From This Moment On" is a country pop ballad set in common time with a free tempo. The song is written in the key of G major with Twain's vocal range spanning from the low note of D_{3} to the high note of C_{5}. Nick Reynolds of BBC Music described the song as a power new country ballad with "a beautiful melody".

== Reception ==
=== Music reviews ===
"From This Moment On" received generally favourable reviews from music critics. Pan-European magazine Music & Media wrote that Twain sounded "something like a cross between the Corrs and Celine Dion". Matt Bjorke of About.com deemed the song as one of the album's highlights, while Elizabeth Kessler of Yahoo! commented that "hardly any song can compare to this love anthem! ... Everyone feels their insides tug as they listen to this heart wrenching song." Country Universe writer Kevin John Coyne did separate reviews for "From This Moment On". While reviewing the duet, Coyne graded it a B and commented that it was mostly a showcase of White's vocals, "who turns in some signature licks and makes Twain seem a bit bland in comparison. However, it also gives the song a bit of a mid-eighties Peter Cetera vibe, which hasn't held up well over time." Coyne concluded, however, that the single release turned the track "into a potent solo number," and noted that "the addition of a Spanish-flavored guitar that borrowed heavily from 'Have You Ever Really Loved a Woman' gave the ballad added oomph." He graded the single release at an A−. At the 1999 Canadian Country Music Awards, "From This Moment On" won the award for Vocal/Instrumental Collaboration of the Year.

=== Chart performance ===
"From This Moment On" achieved considerable commercial success. In the United States, the song reached number four on the Billboard Hot 100, number one on the Adult Contemporary, and number six on the Hot Country Songs component chart. The song also peaked at number 16 on the Pop Songs chart and at number 22 Adult Pop Songs chart. On the chart compiled by Nielsen Soundscan, "From This Moment On" reached number four on the Canadian Singles Chart while going to number one on RPM's Country Songs and Adult Contemporary charts. In Australia, the track debuted at number 32, and climbed to a new peak of number two on its 11th week on the chart. The song stayed on the chart for a total of 32 weeks, and was the 10th best-selling single of 1998 in the country. "From This Moment On" peaked inside the Top 10 in New Zealand, where it reached number seven. The song failed to chart inside the top 10 of a few European countries, such as France, Netherlands, and Sweden. In the United Kingdom, the song debuted and peaked at number nine on the chart issue of November 18, 1998, and has sold more than 295,000 copies in the nation as of June 2019.

== Music video and live performances ==
The song's accompanying music video was directed by Paul Boyd. It depicts Twain wearing a pale gold velvet gown with a chiffon train designed by Marc Bouwer, and a bindi. She is walking down a hallway, attempting to go through several doors; however, they are all locked. Finally she finds an unlocked door, proceeds through it and finds an orchestra being led by a conductor. She stands in front and finishes singing the song. The video uses 'The Right Mix' of the song; this re-recorded solo version features slightly more contemporized instrumentation and removes Bryan White's main vocals, only leaving his backing harmonies intact toward the latter half of the song. The version shown on Twain's video compilations Come On Over: Video Collection (1999) and The Platinum Collection (2001) adds a short outtake after the video, showing Twain accidentally breaking off a doorknob as she attempts to open a door.

Twain has performed "From This Moment On" on every one of her tours and on one occasion with the Backstreet Boys.

== Track listings ==
- CD single
1. "From This Moment On" (Pop Radio Mix) — 4:01
2. "From This Moment On" (The I.V. Mix) — 5:00
- Part I – CD single
1. "From This Moment On" (The Right Mix) — 4:01
2. "You're Still the One" (Single Mix) — 3:18
3. "You're Still the One" (Soul Solution Dance Radio Edit) — 4:03
- Part II – CD single
1. "From This Moment On" (The Right Version) — 4:01
2. "You're Still the One" (Soul Solution Dance Instrumental) — 8:41
3. "Don't Be Stupid (You Know I Love You)" — 3:34
- Australian CD maxi
1. "From This Moment On" (Solo/Vocal Remix) — 3:42
2. "From This Moment On" (International Mix feat. Bryan White) - 4:44
3. "You're Still the One" (Soul Solution Dance Radio Edit) — 4:03
4. "You're Still the One" (Soul Solution Extended Club Mix) — 8:42
5. "You're Still the One" (Doug Beck Pleasure Dub) — 6:09
6. "You're Still the One" (Kano Dub) — 7:46

== Credits and personnel ==
Credits are taken from the Come On Over album booklet.

Studio

- Recorded and mastered at Masterfonics (Nashville, Tennessee)

Personnel

- Shania Twain – writing, vocals, background vocals
- Robert John "Mutt" Lange – writing, background vocals, production
- Bryan White – guest vocals
- Biff Watson – guitars
- Dann Huff – guitars, guitar solo, guitar textures, six-string bass, talk box
- John Hughey – pedal steel guitar
- Joe Chemay – electric and fretless bass
- Michael Omartian – acoustic piano
- Arthur Stead – synthesizer
- Paul Leim – drums
- Carl Marsh – string arrangement and performance
- David Hamilton – string arrangement and performance
- Mike Shipley – mixing
- Olle Romo – programming, Pro Tools, sequencing, editing
- Glenn Meadows – mastering

== Charts ==
=== Weekly charts ===
Weekly chart performance for "From This Moment On"
| Chart (1998–2000) | Peak position |
|---|---|
| Australia (ARIA) | 2 |
| Canada (Nielsen SoundScan) | 4 |
| Canada Top Singles (RPM) | 13 |
| Canada Adult Contemporary (RPM) | 1 |
| Canada Country Singles (RPM) | 1 |
| Europe (European Hot 100 Singles) | 43 |
| France (SNEP) | 35 |
| Netherlands (Dutch Top 40 Tipparade) | 2 |
| Netherlands (Single Top 100) | 53 |
| New Zealand (Recorded Music NZ) | 7 |
| Scottish Singles Sales (Official Charts) | 12 |
| Sweden (Sverigetopplistan) | 15 |
| UK Singles (Official Charts) | 9 |
| US Billboard Hot 100 | 4 |
| US Adult Contemporary (Billboard) | 1 |
| US Adult Pop Airplay (Billboard) | 22 |
| US Hot Country Songs (Billboard) | 6 |
| US Pop Airplay (Billboard) | 16 |
| US Top 40 Tracks (Billboard) | 16 |
| US Country Top 50 (Radio & Records) | 1 |

=== Year-end charts ===
1998 year-end chart performance for "From This Moment On"
| Chart (1998) | Position |
|---|---|
| Australia (ARIA) | 10 |
| Canada Adult Contemporary (RPM) | 7 |
| UK Singles (OCC) | 199 |
| US Adult Contemporary (Billboard) | 31 |
| US Adult Top 40 (Billboard) | 80 |
| US Hot Country Singles & Tracks (Billboard) | 58 |
| US Mainstream Top 40 (Billboard) | 97 |
| US Adult Contemporary (Radio & Records) | 22 |
| US CHR/Pop (Radio & Records) | 86 |
| US Country (Radio & Records) | 43 |
| US Hot AC (Radio & Records) | 75 |

1999 year-end chart performance for "From This Moment On"
| Chart (1999) | Position |
|---|---|
| Brazil (Crowley) | 40 |
| Canada Adult Contemporary (RPM) | 58 |
| Sweden (Hitlistan) | 79 |
| US Billboard Hot 100 | 57 |
| US Adult Contemporary (Billboard) | 2 |
| US Adult Top 40 (Billboard) | 57 |
| US Mainstream Top 40 (Billboard) | 71 |

== Certifications ==
Certifications and sales for "From This Moment On"
| Region | Certification | Certified units/sales |
|---|---|---|
| Australia (ARIA) | 2× Platinum | 140,000^{^} |
| Canada (Music Canada) | 2× Platinum | 160,000^{‡} |
| New Zealand (RMNZ) | Platinum | 10,000^{*} |
| United Kingdom (BPI) | Gold | 400,000^{‡} |
| United States (RIAA) | Platinum | 1,000,000^{‡} |
^{*} Sales figures based on certification alone.^{^} Shipments figures based on certification alone.^{‡} Sales+streaming figures based on certification alone.

== Release history ==
Release dates and formats for "From This Moment On"
| Region | Date | Format(s) | Label(s) | Ref. |
|---|---|---|---|---|
| United States | May 4, 1998 | Country radio | Mercury | |
| Australia | August 10, 1998 | CD | Mercury | |
| United States | August 25, 1998 | Contemporary hit radio | Mercury | |
| United Kingdom | November 16, 1998 | CD; cassette | Mercury | |

== "Da Stanotte in Poi (From This Moment On)" ==
"Da Stanotte in Poi (From This Moment On)"

Single by Andrea Bocelli and Shania Twain

from the album Duets (30th Anniversary)
- Language: English; Italian
- Released: 12 July 2024
- Genre: Pop
- Length: 3:57
- Label: Decca
- Songwriters: Mutt Lange; Shania Twain
- Producer: Rick Nowels

Andrea Bocelli singles chronology
| "Dare To Be" (2024) | "Da Stanotte in Poi (From This Moment On)" (2024) | "Vivo por Ella" (2024) |

Shania Twain singles chronology
| "White Claw" (2024) | "Da Stanotte in Poi (From This Moment On)" (2024) |

Music video
- "Da Stanotte in Poi (From This Moment On)" on YouTube

"Da Stanotte in Poi (From This Moment On)" is a song recorded by Italian tenor Andrea Bocelli and Shania Twain. It was released on 12 July 2024 through Decca Records as the lead single from Bocelli's fourth compilation album Duets (30th Anniversary). The original song features Italian translations of the original lyrics.

=== Promotion ===
On July 19, 2024, the artists performed the song during the final date of Andrea Bocelli 30: The Celebration at the Teatro del Silenzio in Tuscany.

=== Music video ===
The official music video for the song was released on October 25, 2024, on Bocelli's official YouTube channel.

== See also ==
- List of number-one country hits of 1998 (Canada)
- List of number-one adult contemporary singles of 1998 (U.S.)

== Bibliography ==
- Twain, Shania (2011). From This Moment On. Simon & Schuster. ISBN 978-1-4516-2074-0.
- Eggar, Robin (2005). Shania Twain:The Biography. New York City: Country Music Television Inc., Pocket Books. ISBN 0-7434-9735-X.
