= Still the One: Live from Vegas =

Live album by Shania Twain
- Released: March 3, 2015
- Venue: The Colosseum at Caesars Palace, Las Vegas, Nevada
- Length: 68:34
- Label: Mercury Nashville

Shania Twain chronology
Greatest Hits (2004)	Still the One: Live from Vegas (2015)	Now (2017)

Still the One: Live from Vegas is the first live album by Canadian singer-songwriter Shania Twain. It was released on March 3, 2015 by Mercury Nashville.

== Album information ==
Still the One: Live from Vegas features nineteen live tracks from Twain's successful Las Vegas show, called Shania: Still the One. It was released simultaneously with a DVD of the show.

== Track listing ==
All tracks are written by Shania Twain and Robert John "Mutt" Lange, except "You Win My Love" by Lange, "Today Is Your Day" by Twain, "Carrie Anne" by Allan Clarke, Graham Nash, and Tony Hicks, and "Red Storm" by an unknown composer.

Still the One: Live from Vegas - CD edition
No.	Title	Length
1.	"I'm Gonna Getcha Good!"	4:13
2.	"You Win My Love"	4:33
3.	"Don't Be Stupid (You Know I Love You)"	3:44
4.	"Up!"	2:56
5.	"I Ain't No Quitter"	4:10
6.	"No One Needs to Know"	2:59
7.	"Whose Bed Have Your Boots Been Under?"	4:46
8.	"Any Man of Mine"	4:30
9.	"That Don't Impress Me Much"	3:51
10.	"Honey, I'm Home"	3:42
11.	"(If You're Not in It for Love) I'm Outta Here!"	4:57
12.	"Come on Over" (Acoustic)	2:02
13.	"Love Gets Me Every Time" (Acoustic)	1:18
14.	"Rock This Country!" (Acoustic)	3:06
15.	"Today Is Your Day" (Acoustic)	2:44
16.	"You're Still the One"	3:35
17.	"From This Moment On"	4:23
18.	"Red Storm" (Instrumental)	2:49
19.	"Man! I Feel Like a Woman!"	4:16
Total length:		68:34

Still the One: Live from Vegas - DVD/Blu-ray edition
No.	Title	Length
1.	"Opening"	4:13
2.	"I'm Gonna Getcha Good!"	4:13
3.	"You Win My Love"	4:33
4.	"Don't Be Stupid (You Know I Love You)"	3:44
5.	"Up!"	2:56
6.	"Good, Bad and Sexy" (Interlude)	2:56
7.	"I Ain't No Quitter"	4:10
8.	"No One Needs to Know"	2:59
9.	"Whose Bed Have Your Boots Been Under?"	4:46
10.	"Any Man of Mine"	4:30
11.	"Shania Style" (Interlude)	2:56
12.	"That Don't Impress Me Much"	3:51
13.	"Honey, I'm Home"	3:42
14.	"(If You're Not in It for Love) I'm Outta Here!"	4:57
15.	"Carrie Anne" (Dialogue)	2:56
16.	"Come on Over" (Acoustic)	2:02
17.	"Love Gets Me Every Time" (Acoustic)	1:18
18.	"Rock This Country!" (Acoustic)	3:06
19.	"Today Is Your Day" (Acoustic)	2:44
20.	"Black Horse, White Horse" (Interlude)	2:56
21.	"You're Still the One"	3:35
22.	"From This Moment On"	4:23
23.	"Red Storm" (Interlude)	2:49
24.	"Man! I Feel Like a Woman!"	4:16
25.	"Rock This Country!" (Live from Calgary - Credits)	3:06
26.	"Backstage Pass"	61:13

== Charts ==
The album debuted on the Top Country Albums chart at No. 31 before its official release with 1,300 copies sold, and rose to No. 2 the next week with 9,400 copies sold on its official release. It also debuted at No. 58 on the Billboard 200 the same week, and peaked at No. 55 the following week. It has sold 23,100 copies in the US as of March 2015.

=== Weekly charts ===
Chart (2015)	Peak position
Australian Albums (ARIA)	78
Canadian Albums (Billboard)	8
German Albums (Offizielle Top 100)	53
UK Country Compilation Albums (OCC)	2
US Billboard 200	55
US Top Country Albums (Billboard)	2

=== Year-end charts ===
Chart (2015)	Position
US Top Country Albums (Billboard)	73

=== DVD ===
Chart (2015)	Peak position
Austrian Music DVD Chart	1
Belgian flandres Music DVD Chart	2
Belgian Wallonia Music DVD Chart	9
Danish Music DVD Chart	2
Dutch Music DVD Chart	1
French Music DVD Chart	2
German Music DVD Chart	3
Swedish Music DVD Chart	1
Swiss Music DVD Chart	1
UK Music DVD Chart	1

== Release history ==
Region	Date	Label	Format	Catalog
Worldwide	March 3, 2015	Universal Music Group, Virgin EMI Records	CD	0602547185143
Worldwide	March 3, 2015	Universal Music Group, Virgin EMI Records	CD/DVD Deluxe Edition	EREDV1130
United States	March 3, 2015	Mercury Nashville	CD/DVD Deluxe Edition	
United States	March 10, 2015	Mercury Nashville	Digital download	
