= Today Is Your Day =

Single by Shania Twain
- Released: June 12, 2011
- Studio: David Foster's house (Los Angeles, CA)
- Genre: Country pop
- Length: 3:14
- Label: Mercury Nashville
- Songwriter: Shania Twain
- Producers: David Foster; Nathan Chapman; Shania Twain

Shania Twain singles chronology
"Shoes" (2005)	"Today Is Your Day" (2011)	"Endless Love" (2012)

Audio video
- "Today Is Your Day" on YouTube

"Today Is Your Day" is a song by the Canadian singer-songwriter Shania Twain. It was self-penned by Twain and co-produced by David Foster and Nathan Chapman. The song was released on June 12, 2011, by Mercury Nashville Records, as a single to accompany the documentary television series Why Not? with Shania Twain (2011). The song marked Twain's first song release in over six years and actually even the only song release of her own within a timespan of twelve years. Twain wrote the track for self-inspiration, during the development of Why Not? with Shania Twain. To her, "Today Is Your Day" became the theme song for the series, expressing the purpose behind it via music. Despite feeling apprehensive, Twain decided to record the track, which induced her to create her forthcoming fifth studio album. The track is a midtempo ballad in the country pop genre. Lyrically, "Today Is Your Day" regards personal upliftment. "Today Is Your Day" is Twain's first track to have had no involvement from her now ex-husband Robert John "Mutt" Lange in 18 years. It is also only her second self-penned song, the first being "Leaving Is The Only Way Out" from her second studio album The Woman In Me (1995). Twain performed the song on her Rock This Country Tour and in an acoustic version for the Still the One residency.

"Today Is Your Day" has received mixed reviews from music critics and mild commercial performance in Canada and the United States. On the Canadian Hot 100, the song peaked at number 16, while, on the US Billboard Hot 100, it peaked at number 66. It became Twain's first effort to enter the main-genre chart since "Party for Two" (2004). Despite not receiving an official music video, a promotional music video was gathered from footage from Why Not? with Shania Twain.

== Background ==
In 1993, Twain released her self-titled debut album, which caught the attention of record producer Robert John "Mutt" Lange. The two collaborated on songwriting via phone calls for six months, and later established a romantic relationship. They wedded in December 1993 and Twain's second studio album, which they co-wrote together, The Woman in Me (1995) established her as a worldwide commercial success, selling over 12 million copies in the United States and over 20 million worldwide. Twain and Lange continued to collaborate on her subsequent albums Come On Over (1997) and Up! (2002); the prior went on to sell over 40 million copies worldwide and became the best-selling album by a female artist. After selling over 75 million records worldwide, making her the top-selling female artist in country music history, and releasing a Greatest Hits (2004) album, Twain decided to take a musical hiatus in 2005. In 2008, it was announced that after 14 years of marriage, Twain and Lange were in the process of divorcing. The singer discovered her husband had an affair with her friend and confidant, Marie Anne Thiebaud, which Lange and Thiebaud never admitted to. The divorce was finalized on June 9, 2010.

According to Twain, she became depressed and lost her desire to live after the divorce. As a distraction, she began to write a memoir, titled From This Moment On after the 1998 song of the same name. She then re-evaluated her life and noted a pattern of withholding emotions, which affected her voice for both speaking and singing. She explained the loss of her voice resulted from the cumulative stress of experiencing domestic violence in her childhood, the death of her parents, stress from her musical career, and the divorce. As a result, the singer developed dysphonia, an impairment in the ability to produce sound because of tightened muscles enveloping her voice box. In order to recover, Twain embarked on a documented journey with the series Why Not? with Shania Twain. Twain wanted to go outside her comfort zone and perform once again, while inspiring viewers to be proactive about their own problems.

== Writing and recording ==
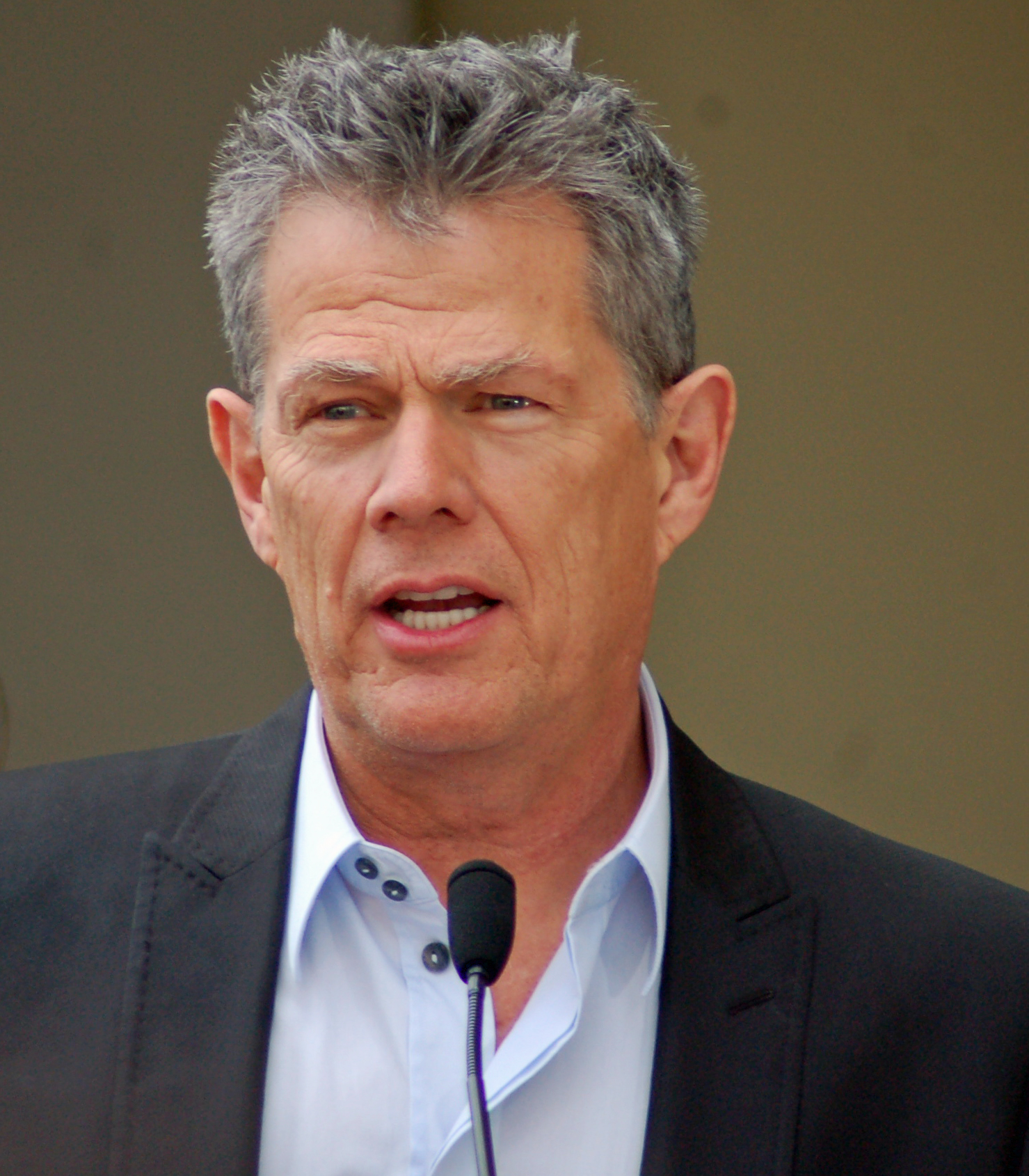
David Foster (pictured) was the first producer Twain collaborated with since her divorce from Robert John "Mutt" Lange.

After repeating to herself, 'Today is your day! You can do it!', Twain decided to compose a song for self-inspiration. Twain described the decision to write the song as crucial because it was her first songwriting effort since her separation from Lange. She had to "find [herself] as a songwriter" and become independent again. "I was petrified of writing a new song without Mutt. A whole new world for me. It had been many, many years since I had written by myself so that was new and scary", Twain said. Twain found writing the music quite simple, as it only occupied two lines of sheet music. The lyrics then flowed as Why Not? with Shania Twain progressed. "Today Is Your Day" inspirited her; hence, she considered sharing it with the series. The concept frightened her: "Sharing that song with other people, exposing, and basically allowing myself to be vulnerable and judged, it scared the heck out of me." She believed it became a natural theme song for the series. She explained, "From the inception of documenting the journey, the song was also created at that moment. And it has evolved with it all along the way."

As part of Why Not? with Shania Twain, she arranged a session with music producer David Foster, hoping to collaborate on "Today Is Your Day". Although she felt skeptical, Twain visited vocal coach Eric Vetro to prepare for her session with Foster. Twain and Vetro executed vocal exercises to loosen up the tension and tightness in her vocal cords. "The goal is to free up, to let go. She has to take all of that tension and tightness that she's been feeling for so long, and transform it to free herself from it. And to start singing from her heart again, the way she did when she was a little girl, when she started," Vetro stated. He also opined that Twain was ready to return to her music career. Twain learned beneficial vocal techniques and appreciated Vetro's understanding of her psyche.

Nevertheless, Twain remained frightened that Foster would dislike the song or her voice. To qualm her fears, Twain approached the session as if she were introducing "Today Is Your Day" as a songwriter, rather than a singer. Twain and Foster recorded the demo of "Today Is Your Day" at Foster's home studio in Los Angeles, California. They created the musical arrangement as the session progressed. Background vocals were provided by Twain and her sister, Carrie Ann Twain, using a handheld microphone. Foster then suggested for Twain to record lead vocals in his home's vocal booth. After agreeing, Twain nervously approached the recording session. Once immersed in the process, she began to enjoy it. The singer considered her session with Foster a "landmark moment in [her] journey" through Why Not? with Shania Twain and described it as second nature, as if she never put her musical career to a halt. Twain later recorded the studio version of "Today Is Your Day" and co-produced it alongside Foster and Nathan Chapman. The song made Twain feel comfortable recording music again, thus she began to work on her forthcoming fifth studio album, Now (2017).

== Release ==
The song premiered on OWN: Oprah Winfrey Network on June 12, 2011, immediately after the broadcast premiere of Why Not? with Shania Twain's final episode, "Endless Love" at 11 P.M. EST. Subsequently, on the same night, "Today Was Your Day" was released to country radio and digital retailers in Canada and the United States, with an international release the next day. It became her first song release since "Shoes" (2005) from the Desperate Housewives soundtrack, and her first self-penned song released since "Leaving Is the Only Way Out" from The Woman in Me (1995); the two are her only self-penned tracks released. An official music video for "Today Is Your Day" was not filmed; instead, the song was given a promotional music video compiled from highlights from Why Not? with Shania Twain. It premiered on Vevo on June 23, 2011, and was released to the iTunes Store on June 28, 2011. It remains one of only five (the other four being "When", "Ka-Ching!, "She's Not Just a Pretty Face" and "It Only Hurts when I'm Breathing) Shania Twain music videos to remain commercially unavailable.

== Composition ==
"Today Is Your Day" is a song with a length of 3 minutes and 12 seconds. The song is a slow mid-tempo ballad of the country pop genre. Nonetheless, several critics, such as Nicholas Köhler and Ken MacQueen Maclean's, have described the track to be a piece of pop music, rather than country music. It commences with a sole piano accompanying Twain's voice, and later progresses to an assortment of banjo, string instruments and other instrumentation. However, the production is maintained as sparse, leaving Twain's vocals at center. The lyrics are written in second person and discuss optimism and personal upliftment. In the bridge she sings, "Brush yourself off no regrets / This is as good as it gets / Don’t expect more or less / Just go out and give it your best", meaning one must be able to disregard dreaming for a better day because "today is all you’ve got". Melinda Newman of HitFix presumed, considering Twain's back story, that Twain wrote "Today Is Your Day" as a message for herself.

== Critical reception ==
The song received mixed reviews from music critics. Melinda Newman of HitFix said it was "a bit snoozy", however complemented Twain's reasonably strong vocals. Newman added, "She’s not pushing or belting in any way, but she’s upfront and center. However, her delivery is hardly the peppy rallying call that the lyrics call for and if a song ever demanded to be uptempo, this would be it." Sean Daly of the St. Petersburg Times called the song "a shocking stinkeroo every which way." Daly criticized Twain's vocal delivery, noting she sounded as though she sang through the side of her mouth much like James Cagney, and said the track reinforced the skeptics who insisted Lange was the reason for Twain's success. He concluded, "If 'Today Is Your Day' is a sign of things to come, you might want to hold your breath on that comeback." Jenna Hally Rubenstein of MTV was disappointed with "Today Is Your Day", but said she would "take it" following the singer's long absence from music. Rubenstein commented that the song was undoubtedly saccharine, yet Twain's lush and rich voice prevailed.

== Chart performance ==
On the week ending July 2, 2011, "Today Is Your Day" debuted at number 14 on the Canadian Hot 100. The following week, it descended to number 45. Since, the song has spent six weeks on the Canadian Hot 100. On the week ending July 2, 2011, "Today Is Your Day" also entered on the US Billboard Hot 100, at number 66 with 46,000 digital downloads (its sole week on the chart). This marked Twain's first entry on the Billboard Hot 100 chart since "Party for Two" (2004) spent its last week on the chart in February 2005. On the same week, "Today Is Your Day" entered at number 40 on the US Hot Country Songs chart, ranking Twain's fourth-highest debut. Two weeks later, on the week ending July 16, 2011, the track reached its peak at number 36, and spent a total of six weeks on the chart.

== Track listing ==
- Digital Download
1. "Today Is Your Day" – 3:14

== Charts ==
Chart (2011)	Peak position
Belgium (Ultratip Bubbling Under Wallonia)	41
Canada Hot 100 (Billboard)	14
Canada AC (Billboard)	21
Canada Country (Billboard)	18
US Billboard Hot 100	66
US Hot Country Songs (Billboard)	36
