= Now (Shania Twain album) =

2017 studio album by Shania Twain

Studio album by Shania Twain
- Released: September 29, 2017
- Recorded: 2014–2017
- Studios: Serenity West Recording (Los Angeles, California); House of Blues Studios (Encino, California); Sticky Studios (Surrey, England); Blackbird Studio (Nashville, Tennessee); RAK Studios (London, England)
- Genres: Country; pop
- Length: 41:25
- Label: Mercury Nashville
- Producers: Ron Aniello; Jake Gosling; Jacquire King; Matthew Koma; Shania Twain

Shania Twain chronology
| Still the One: Live from Vegas (2015) | Now (2017) | Not Just a Girl (The Highlights) (2022) |

Singles from Now
- 1. "Life's About to Get Good" Released: June 15, 2017; 2. "Swingin' with My Eyes Closed" Released: August 18, 2017; 3. "We Got Something They Don't" Released: October 30, 2017; 4. "Who's Gonna Be Your Girl" Released: December 15, 2017

Now is the fifth studio album by Canadian singer and songwriter Shania Twain and her first in 15 years. It was released on September 29, 2017, by Mercury Nashville. The album was produced by Twain alongside Ron Aniello, Jake Gosling, Jacquire King and Matthew Koma. Following a severely weakened singing voice caused by Lyme disease and dysphonia, Twain took an indefinite hiatus from music beginning in the mid-2000s, and at one point was unsure if she would ever be able to sing again. Following intense vocal rehabilitation and a successful concert residency in Las Vegas, Shania: Still the One, she began planning a new studio album in 2013. Written solely by Twain, Now is her first studio album in which she assumed an integral role in its production, co-producing every track. It is also Twain's first album since her 1995 album The Woman in Me to not be co-written with or produced by her ex-husband Robert John "Mutt" Lange.

Her first studio album since Up! (2002), Twain called Now her most personal album. The album received mixed reviews from music critics, with some complimenting the album's production and Twain's long-awaited return to music, while others criticized her vocals and the album's lyrics. Now debuted at number one on the Billboard 200, Canadian Albums and Top Country Albums charts and reached number one in several countries worldwide, as well as being certified platinum in Canada. Four singles, "Life's About to Get Good", "Swingin' With My Eyes Closed", "Who's Gonna Be Your Girl" and "We Got Something They Don't", were released in promotion for the album. The first two singles, "Life's About to Get Good" and "Swingin' With My Eyes Closed", as well as the unreleased track "Soldier", were all given music videos. Twain further promoted the album with television performances, festival appearances, interviews, and the successful Now Tour in 2018.

== Background ==
After releasing the compilation album Greatest Hits in 2004, Twain released the single "Shoes" for the soundtrack to the television series Desperate Housewives. Later, experiencing the breakdown of her marriage, Twain divorced her longtime husband and songwriting partner, music producer Robert John "Mutt" Lange, in 2008. She remarried to Frédéric Thiébaud, the husband of her former best friend, in 2011. The same year, she released the promotional single "Today Is Your Day", which had a moderate impact on the charts.

Twain underwent vocal therapy after being diagnosed with dysphonia and Lyme disease, which caused her to nearly lose her singing voice; she embarked on a concert tour and Las Vegas residency before revealing that new music would arrive in 2017.

== Singles ==
Twain premiered "Life's About to Get Good", the album's lead single, at the Stagecoach Festival in April 2017 before officially releasing it as a single on June 15, 2017. The single debuted and peaked at number 36 on the US Billboard Country Airplay chart. A music video for the song, directed by Matthew Cullen, was released in July. "Swingin' With My Eyes Closed" was released as the second single from Now on August 18, 2017, later accompanied by a music video. "We Got Something They Don't" was released as the third single from the album on October 30, 2017, followed by "Who's Gonna Be Your Girl" as the fourth single on December 17.

Two tracks from Now were released as promotional singles ahead of the album's release: "Poor Me" was released as the first promotional single on July 20, 2017, accompanied by an official lyric video, followed by "We Got Something They Don't" on September 15.

== Critical reception ==
Professional ratings
Aggregate scores
| Source | Rating |
|---|---|
| AnyDecentMusic? | 5.0/10 |
| Metacritic | 58/100 |
Review scores
| Source | Rating |
| AllMusic | 2.5/5 stars |
| Consequence of Sound | C |
| Entertainment Weekly | B+ |
| The Guardian | 3/5 stars |
| Pitchfork | 6.6/10 |
| Rolling Stone | 3.5/5 stars |

Now received mixed reviews from music critics. The album received a weighted score of 58 out of 100 from review aggregate website Metacritic, indicating "mixed or average reviews", based on 11 reviews from music critics.

Robert Crawford of Rolling Stone called the album "dramatic and diverse", adding that "Now continues the exploration we last saw with 2002's Up!." Sounds Like Nashville's Annie Reuter wrote that "Twain proves herself relevant on Now", praising the "cutting-edge production that reminds the listener exactly why she is the best-selling female country artist of all time." The Wall Street Journal writer Barry Mazor wrote that the album finds Twain "singing in a somewhat lower register—audible, but not dramatically different." Mazor also praised Twain's sonic direction saying, "If it was commonly suggested during her hit run that the sounds and video images were manipulative concoctions developed by Mr. Lange, and Ms. Twain was merely his puppet, that charge is certainly well-debunked now. Conversely, Mikael Wood of the Los Angeles Times criticized Twain's vocal delivery on the uptempo tracks as "flat and robotic".

== Commercial performance ==
Now debuted at number one in the United Kingdom, becoming her second album to top the UK Albums Chart after Come On Over. It also entered at the top position in Australia, becoming her third album after Come On Over and Up! to reach the summit of the ARIA Albums Chart. In the United States, it opened atop the Billboard 200 with 137,000 album-equivalent units, which included 134,000 album sales, and became her second number-one album in the country after Up!. Now descended to number 29 the next week, earning 15,000 album-equivalent units and selling 14,000 copies. As of August 2018 the album had sold 233,800 copies in the United States.

The record additionally debuted at number one on the Canadian Albums Chart with 72,000 copies sold and 73,000 album-equivalent units in its first week, becoming Canada's biggest album opening since Drake's Views (2016) and her fourth entry to reach its summit after Come On Over, Up!, and Greatest Hits. As of December 2017 the album has sold 106,000 copies in Canada, making it the best selling Canadian CD that year.

== Track listing ==
All tracks are written by Shania Twain.

Standard edition
| No. | Title | Producer(s) | Length |
|---|---|---|---|
| 1. | "Swingin' with My Eyes Closed" | Shania Twain; Ron Aniello | 3:33 |
| 2. | "Home Now" | Twain; Aniello; Matthew Koma | 3:21 |
| 3. | "Light of My Life" | Twain; Jake Gosling | 3:36 |
| 4. | "Poor Me" | Twain; Gosling | 3:21 |
| 5. | "Who's Gonna Be Your Girl" | Twain; Aniello; Koma | 4:13 |
| 6. | "More Fun" | Twain; Jacquire King | 3:38 |
| 7. | "I'm Alright" | Twain; Aniello | 3:51 |
| 8. | "Roll Me on the River" | Twain; Aniello; Koma | 3:06 |
| 9. | "We Got Something They Don't" | Twain; King | 3:28 |
| 10. | "You Can't Buy Love" | Twain; Gosling | 2:39 |
| 11. | "Life's About to Get Good" | Twain; Aniello; Koma | 3:40 |
| 12. | "Soldier" | Twain; King | 2:59 |
| Total length: | | | 41:25 |

Deluxe edition
| No. | Title | Producer(s) | Length |
|---|---|---|---|
| 1. | "Swingin' with My Eyes Closed" | Shania Twain; Ron Aniello | 3:33 |
| 2. | "Home Now" | Twain; Aniello; Matthew Koma | 3:21 |
| 3. | "Light of My Life" | Twain; Jake Gosling | 3:36 |
| 4. | "Poor Me" | Twain; Gosling | 3:21 |
| 5. | "Who's Gonna Be Your Girl" | Twain; Aniello; Koma | 4:13 |
| 6. | "More Fun" | Twain; Jacquire King | 3:38 |
| 7. | "I'm Alright" | Twain; Aniello | 3:51 |
| 8. | "Let's Kiss and Make Up" | Twain; Aniello; Dan Book | 3:59 |
| 9. | "Where Do You Think You're Going" | Twain; Aniello | 3:22 |
| 10. | "Roll Me on the River" | Twain; Aniello; Koma | 3:06 |
| 11. | "We Got Something They Don't" | Twain; King | 3:28 |
| 12. | "Because of You" | Twain; Gosling | 3:47 |
| 13. | "You Can't Buy Love" | Twain; Gosling | 2:39 |
| 14. | "Life's About to Get Good" | Twain; Aniello; Koma | 3:40 |
| 15. | "Soldier" | Twain; King | 2:59 |
| 16. | "All in All" | Twain; King | 3:43 |
| Total length: | | | 56:16 |

== Personnel ==
Adapted from AllMusic.

Vocals

- Shania Twain – lead vocals, background vocals
- Dan Book – background vocals
- Matthew Koma – background vocals
- Jason Wade – background vocals

Musicians

- David Angell – violin
- Ron Aniello – acoustic guitar, baritone guitar, bass, drums, electric guitar, hammer, keyboards, organ, piano, Rhodes piano, synthesizer, synthesizer strings, Wurlitzer
- Jimmy Baldwin – tenor saxophone
- Eli Beaird – bass
- Roy Bittan – piano
- Dan Book – keyboards
- Rogét Chahayed – piano, synthesizer
- Matt Chamberlain – drums
- Jude Cole – acoustic guitar
- Max Collins – bass, drums
- Adam Coltman – handclapping
- Tom Culm – handclapping
- Eric Darken – chimes, percussion, vibraphone
- David Davidson – violin
- George Deoring – ukulele
- Kris Donegan – acoustic guitar, electric guitar, tiple
- Ian Fitchuk – drums, organ, piano
- Michael Freeman – electric guitar
- Matthew Gooderham – handclapping
- Jake Gosling – drums, Güiro, handclapping, organ, Rhodes piano, percussion, piano, synthesizer, tambourine
- Peter Gosling – piano
- Matthew Koma – acoustic guitar, bass, electric guitar, synthesizer, vocoder
- Tim Lauer – keyboards, mellotron, strings
- Greg Leisz – dobro, pedal steel
- Chris Leonard – acoustic guitar, electric guitar, handclapping
- Darrell Leonard – flugelhorn
- Kris Mazzarisi – drums
- Andy Nixon – drums
- Dave Palmer – piano
- Noam Pikelny – banjo
- Kaveh Rastegar – bass
- Hilda Sarighani Reis – cello
- Steve Richards – cello
- Leif Shires – trumpet
- Spencer Thomson – electric guitar, keyboards
- Shania Twain – electric guitar, keyboards, handclapping
- Oscar Utterström – trombone
- Mike Viola – electric guitar
- Chris West – baritone saxophone
- Kristin Wilkinson – viola
- Gabe Witcher – violin

Production and imagery

- Mert Alaş – photography
- Ron Aniello – producer, programming, string arrangements
- Giovanni Bianco – creative director
- Dan Book – editing, engineer, producer, programming, vocal producer
- Sean Budum – assistant
- Eric Darken – programming
- Michael Freeman – assistant
- Lauren Goldblum – creative art
- Jake Gosling – engineer, producer, programming
- Nicole Kim – graphic design
- Jackson King – assistant
- Jacquire King – assistant, producer, programming
- Matthew Koma – arranger, producer, programming, vocal producer
- Rob Lebret – engineer
- Kolton Lee – assistant
- Jordan Lehning – horn arrangement
- Brian Lucey – mastering
- Clif Norrell – engineer
- Danny Pellegrini – assistant
- Ross Petersen – engineer
- Michael Peterson – assistant
- Brian Phillips – editing
- Marcus Piggott – photography
- Cheyanne Proud – graphic design
- Lowell Reynolds – engineer
- Olle Romo – engineer, programming
- Mark "Spike" Stent – mixing
- Geoff Swan – assistant
- Spencer Thomson – programming
- Matt Tuggle – engineer
- Shania Twain – producer, programming
- Sadaharu Yagi – engineer

== Charts ==
=== Weekly charts ===
| Chart (2017) | Peak position |
|---|---|
| Australian Albums (ARIA) | 1 |
| Austrian Albums (Ö3 Austria) | 16 |
| Belgian Albums (Ultratop Flanders) | 39 |
| Belgian Albums (Ultratop Wallonia) | 43 |
| Canadian Albums (Billboard) | 1 |
| Czech Albums (ČNS IFPI) | 60 |
| Dutch Albums (Album Top 100) | 22 |
| French Albums (SNEP) | 56 |
| German Albums (Offizielle Top 100) | 12 |
| Irish Albums (IRMA) | 4 |
| New Zealand Albums (RMNZ) | 3 |
| Norwegian Albums (VG-lista) | 21 |
| Scottish Albums (Official Charts) | 1 |
| Spanish Albums (Promusicae) | 39 |
| Swedish Albums (Sverigetopplistan) | 42 |
| Swiss Albums (Schweizer Hitparade) | 10 |
| UK Albums (Official Charts) | 1 |
| US Billboard 200 | 1 |
| US Top Country Albums (Billboard) | 1 |

=== Year-end charts ===
| Chart (2017) | Position |
|---|---|
| Australian Albums (ARIA) | 82 |
| Canadian Albums (Billboard) | 14 |
| US Billboard 200 | 188 |
| US Top Country Albums (Billboard) | 34 |

| Chart (2018) | Position |
|---|---|
| US Top Country Albums (Billboard) | 88 |

== Certifications ==
| Region | Certification | Certified units/sales |
|---|---|---|
| Canada (Music Canada) | Platinum | 80,000^{‡} |
| United Kingdom (BPI) | Silver | 60,000^{‡} |
| United States | — | 233,800 |
Summaries
| Worldwide | — | 600,000 |
^{‡} Sales+streaming figures based on certification alone.

== Release history ==
| Region | Date | Format(s) | Label | Edition(s) | Ref. |
|---|---|---|---|---|---|
| Canada United States | September 29, 2017 | CD; digital download; vinyl | Mercury Nashville | Standard; Deluxe | |
