= Shania: Still the One =

Shania Twain concert residency

- Residency by Shania Twain
- Location: Paradise, Nevada, U.S.
- Venue: The Colosseum at Caesars Palace
- Start date: December 1, 2012
- End date: December 13, 2014
- Legs: 10
- No. of shows: 105
- Box office: $43.6 million

Shania Twain concert chronology
- Up! Tour (2003–04); Shania: Still the One (2012–14); Rock This Country Tour (2015)

Shania: Still the One was the first concert residency by Canadian singer-songwriter Shania Twain, performed at The Colosseum at Caesars Palace on the Las Vegas Strip in Paradise, Nevada. The residency began on December 1, 2012, and ended on December 13, 2014, with Twain performing 105 shows.

Shania: Still the One was created by Twain, produced by AEG Live and directed by Raj Kapoor. The purpose of the show was to "take fans on a spectacular journey through the various stages of Shania's life and career in an unforgettable evening filled with music, multi-sensory and visual experiences, fashion and the unexpected".

== Background ==
In 1993, Twain released her eponymous debut studio album, which caught the attention of record producer Robert John "Mutt" Lange. The two collaborated on songwriting via phone calls for six months, and later established a romantic relationship. Soon after, they wedded in December 1993 and Twain's second studio album The Woman in Me (1995) established Twain as a superstar, selling over 12 million copies in the United States. Twain and Lange continued to collaborate on her subsequent albums Come on Over (1997) and Up! (2002); the prior went on to sell over 40 million copies worldwide and became the best-selling album by a female artist. After selling a total of over 75 million records worldwide, making her the top-selling female artist in country music history, Twain decided to take a musical hiatus in 2005. In 2008, it was announced that after 14 years of marriage, Twain and Lange were in the process of divorcing. The singer later said she had discovered her husband's infidelity with her best friend Marie Anne Thiebaud, although Lange and Thiebaud have never admitted to it. The divorce was finalized on June 9, 2010.

According to Twain, she became depressed and lost her desire to live following the divorce. As a distraction from it, Twain commenced to write her memoir From This Moment On (titled after the 1998 song of the same name). She then began to re-evaluate her life and noted a pattern of attempting to withhold emotions, which affected her voice (for both speaking and singing). She explained the loss of her voice was attributed to a cumulative stress that began with domestic violence in her childhood, continued with the death of her parents and the stress from her musical career, and finally exploded with the divorce. As a result, the singer developed dysphonia, an impairment in the ability to produce voice sounds using the vocal organs as a result of tightened muscles enveloping her voice box. In order to recover her voice and heal wounds caused by the divorce, Twain embarked on a documented journey with the series Why Not? with Shania Twain. The goal was executed via Twain performing acts out her comfort zone to once again be able to perform, while inspiring viewers to be proactive about their dilemmas.

Twain wrote the song "Today Is Your Day" for self-inspiration, during the development of Why Not? with Shania Twain. The song premiered on OWN: Oprah Winfrey Network on June 12, 2011, immediately after the broadcast premiere of Why Not? with Shania Twain's final episode, "Endless Love". Subsequently, on the same night, "Today Is Your Day" was released to country radio and digital retailers in Canada and the United States, with an international release the next day. It became her first song release since "Shoes" (2005) from the Desperate Housewives soundtrack, and her first solo-written song released since "Leaving Is the Only Way Out" from The Woman in Me (1995).

== Development ==
Besides getting back onstage in the first place, I'm just looking forward to contact with the fans again. Being able to connect directly with the fans during the show has always been a pleasure, and that's probably what I'm looking forward to the most, above and beyond the live show itself

— Twain

Having last performed live in July 2004 during her Up! Tour, Twain announced the Vegas residency on June 8, 2011. During a press conference announcing the show, she said that she will "let [her] imagination run wild" and that she is "going to go nuts creatively" for the show. She revealed that: "It's been a healing year, I've learned how to commit myself and put that into healing, instead of fear and anxiety, which is a big turnaround".

The show was created by Twain, produced by AEG Live and directed by Raj Kapoor. The purpose of the show was to "take fans on a spectacular journey through the various stages of Shania's life and career in an unforgettable evening filled with music, multi-sensory and visual experiences, fashion and the unexpected". Kapoor revealed that "Shania wants her fans to share her spirit and passion in 4D and this show will capture the essence, soul and inspirations of Shania and her timeless music and lyrics brought to life with extraordinary beauty and powerfully intense visuals. Shania's creative world will be an immersive fusion of music, fantasy, spectacle and the fragile beauty of nature all brought together in a night of unforgettable entertainment."

Of getting over her vocal dysphonia, Twain told Las Vegas Weekly: "I am being very conscientious. I take a lot of steam showers, and [former Colosseum headliner] Bette Midler has recommended some [throat] sprays. Everybody has given me their little tips, and I'm just being very careful. I take good care of myself."

== Commercial response ==
The show became a box office hit grossing over $43 million from a total of 346,021 sold tickets during the two-year run.

== Set list ==
The following set list is representative of the show's opening night on December 1, 2012. It is not representative of all concerts for the duration of the residency.

1. "I'm Gonna Getcha Good!"
2. "You Win My Love"
3. "Don't Be Stupid (You Know I Love You)"
4. "Up!"
5. "I Ain't No Quitter"
6. "No One Needs to Know"
7. "Whose Bed Have Your Boots Been Under?"
8. "Any Man of Mine"
9. "That Don't Impress Me Much"
10. "Honey, I'm Home"
11. "(If You're Not in It for Love) I'm Outta Here!"
12. "Carrie Anne" (performed with RyanDan)
13. "Come On Over" (Acoustic)
14. "Love Gets Me Every Time" (Acoustic)
15. "Rock This Country!" (Acoustic)
16. "Today Is Your Day" (Acoustic)
17. "You're Still the One"
18. "From This Moment On"
19. "Man! I Feel Like a Woman!"

== Shows ==
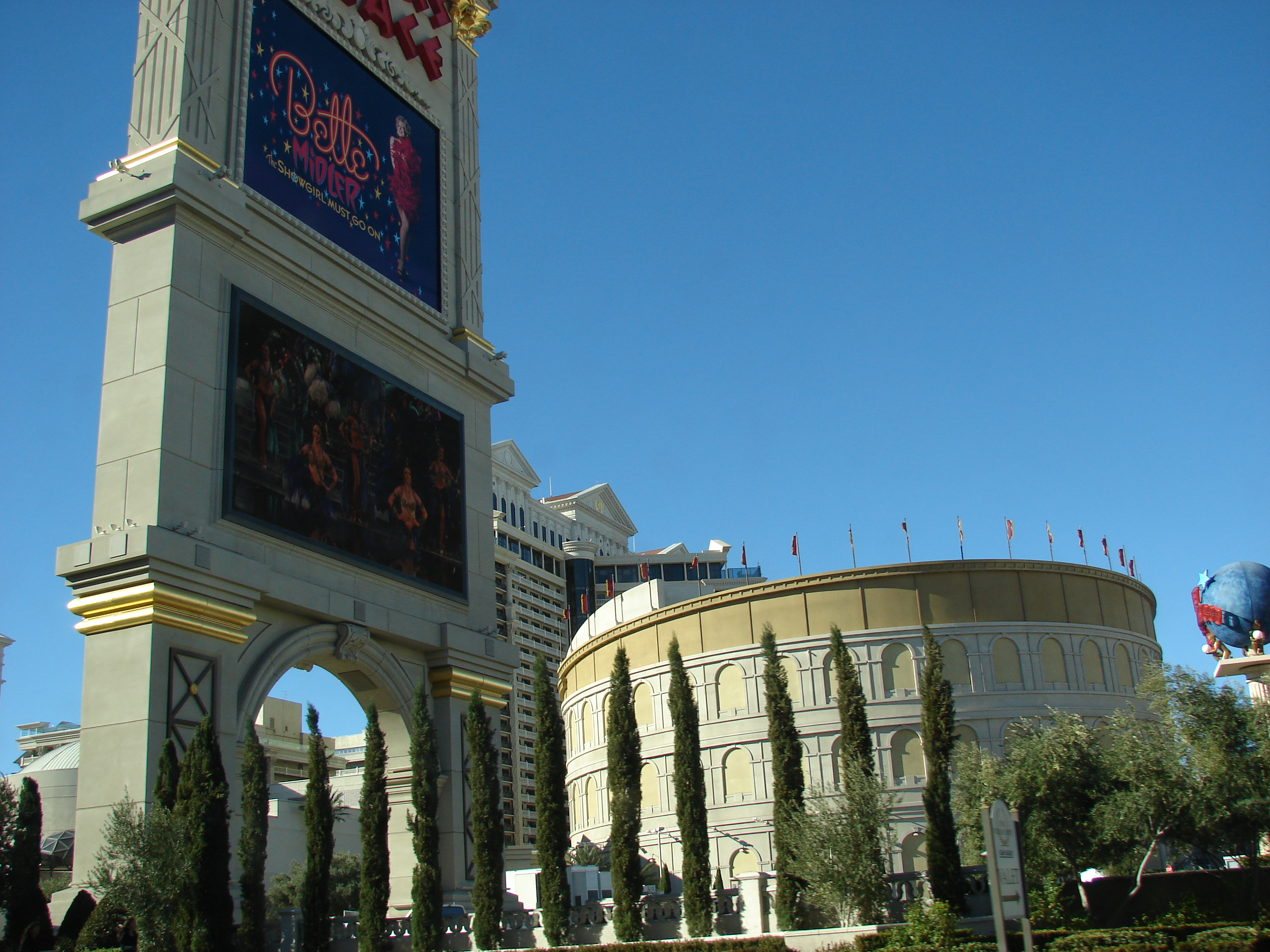
The Colosseum at Caesars Palace, the venue of the residency

List of 2012 performances
Date	Attendance	Revenue
December 1, 2012	40,007 / 40,369	$5,706,310
December 2, 2012	40,007 / 40,369	$5,706,310
December 5, 2012	40,007 / 40,369	$5,706,310
December 6, 2012	40,007 / 40,369	$5,706,310
December 8, 2012	40,007 / 40,369	$5,706,310
December 9, 2012	40,007 / 40,369	$5,706,310
December 11, 2012	40,007 / 40,369	$5,706,310
December 12, 2012	40,007 / 40,369	$5,706,310
December 14, 2012	40,007 / 40,369	$5,706,310
December 15, 2012	40,007 / 40,369	$5,706,310

List of 2013 performances
Date	Attendance	Revenue
March 19, 2013	51,945 / 56,866	$7,352,190
March 20, 2013	51,945 / 56,866	$7,352,190
March 23, 2013	51,945 / 56,866	$7,352,190
March 24, 2013	51,945 / 56,866	$7,352,190
March 26, 2013	51,945 / 56,866	$7,352,190
March 27, 2013	51,945 / 56,866	$7,352,190
March 29, 2013	51,945 / 56,866	$7,352,190
March 30, 2013	51,945 / 56,866	$7,352,190
April 2, 2013	51,945 / 56,866	$7,352,190
April 3, 2013	51,945 / 56,866	$7,352,190
April 5, 2013	51,945 / 56,866	$7,352,190
April 6, 2013	51,945 / 56,866	$7,352,190
April 9, 2013	51,945 / 56,866	$7,352,190
April 10, 2013	51,945 / 56,866	$7,352,190
May 14, 2013	40,362 / 46,579	$5,026,240
May 15, 2013	40,362 / 46,579	$5,026,240
May 18, 2013	40,362 / 46,579	$5,026,240
May 19, 2013	40,362 / 46,579	$5,026,240
May 21, 2013	40,362 / 46,579	$5,026,240
May 22, 2013	40,362 / 46,579	$5,026,240
May 25, 2013	40,362 / 46,579	$5,026,240
May 26, 2013	40,362 / 46,579	$5,026,240
May 28, 2013	40,362 / 46,579	$5,026,240
May 29, 2013	40,362 / 46,579	$5,026,240
May 31, 2013	40,362 / 46,579	$5,026,240
June 1, 2013	40,362 / 46,579	$5,026,240
October 15, 2013	41,225 / 49,148	$5,486,326
October 16, 2013	41,225 / 49,148	$5,486,326
October 18, 2013	41,225 / 49,148	$5,486,326
October 19, 2013	41,225 / 49,148	$5,486,326
October 23, 2013	41,225 / 49,148	$5,486,326
October 24, 2013	41,225 / 49,148	$5,486,326
October 26, 2013	41,225 / 49,148	$5,486,326
October 27, 2013	41,225 / 49,148	$5,486,326
October 29, 2013	41,225 / 49,148	$5,486,326
October 30, 2013	41,225 / 49,148	$5,486,326
November 2, 2013	41,225 / 49,148	$5,486,326
November 3, 2013	41,225 / 49,148	$5,486,326
November 30, 2013	30,966 / 36,176	$3,504,748
December 1, 2013	30,966 / 36,176	$3,504,748
December 3, 2013	30,966 / 36,176	$3,504,748
December 4, 2013	30,966 / 36,176	$3,504,748
December 7, 2013	30,966 / 36,176	$3,504,748
December 8, 2013	30,966 / 36,176	$3,504,748
December 10, 2013	30,966 / 36,176	$3,504,748
December 11, 2013	30,966 / 36,176	$3,504,748
December 13, 2013	30,966 / 36,176	$3,504,748
December 14, 2013	30,966 / 36,176	$3,504,748

List of 2014 performances
Date	Attendance	Revenue
January 22, 2014	41,620 / 48,434	$4,803,883
January 23, 2014	41,620 / 48,434	$4,803,883
January 25, 2014	41,620 / 48,434	$4,803,883
January 26, 2014	41,620 / 48,434	$4,803,883
January 31, 2014	41,620 / 48,434	$4,803,883
February 4, 2014	41,620 / 48,434	$4,803,883
February 5, 2014	41,620 / 48,434	$4,803,883
February 9, 2014	41,620 / 48,434	$4,803,883
February 11, 2014	41,620 / 48,434	$4,803,883
February 12, 2014	41,620 / 48,434	$4,803,883
February 14, 2014	41,620 / 48,434	$4,803,883
February 15, 2014	41,620 / 48,434	$4,803,883
May 20, 2014	28,208 / 30,796	$3,197,239
May 21, 2014	28,208 / 30,796	$3,197,239
May 24, 2014	28,208 / 30,796	$3,197,239
May 25, 2014	28,208 / 30,796	$3,197,239
May 28, 2014	28,208 / 30,796	$3,197,239
May 31, 2014	28,208 / 30,796	$3,197,239
June 1, 2014	28,208 / 30,796	$3,197,239
June 3, 2014	28,208 / 30,796	$3,197,239
June 4, 2014	28,208 / 30,796	$3,197,239
June 6, 2014	28,208 / 30,796	$3,197,239
June 7, 2014	28,208 / 30,796	$3,197,239
July 12, 2014	20,137 / 22,422	$2,187,641
July 13, 2014	20,137 / 22,422	$2,187,641
July 15, 2014	20,137 / 22,422	$2,187,641
July 16, 2014	20,137 / 22,422	$2,187,641
July 18, 2014	20,137 / 22,422	$2,187,641
July 19, 2014	20,137 / 22,422	$2,187,641
July 22, 2014	20,137 / 22,422	$2,187,641
July 23, 2014	20,137 / 22,422	$2,187,641
October 8, 2014	30,403 / 31,899	$3,668,090
October 10, 2014	30,403 / 31,899	$3,668,090
October 11, 2014	30,403 / 31,899	$3,668,090
October 14, 2014	30,403 / 31,899	$3,668,090
October 15, 2014	30,403 / 31,899	$3,668,090
October 17, 2014	30,403 / 31,899	$3,668,090
October 18, 2014	30,403 / 31,899	$3,668,090
October 21, 2014	30,403 / 31,899	$3,668,090
October 24, 2014	30,403 / 31,899	$3,668,090
October 25, 2014	30,403 / 31,899	$3,668,090
December 6, 2014	21,148 / 22,262	$2,630,383
December 7, 2014	21,148 / 22,262	$2,630,383
December 9, 2014	21,148 / 22,262	$2,630,383
December 10, 2014	21,148 / 22,262	$2,630,383
December 12, 2014	21,148 / 22,262	$2,630,383
December 13, 2014	21,148 / 22,262	$2,630,383

== Cancelled shows ==
Date	Reason
January 28, 2014	Inflamed vocal chords
January 29, 2014	Inflamed vocal chords
February 1, 2014	Inflamed vocal chords
July 25, 2014	Flu
July 26, 2014	Flu

== Personnel ==
- Show Creator / Executive Producer – Shania Twain
- Show Director – Raj Kapoor
- Production Designer – Michael Cotten
- Costumier – Marc Bouwer
- Lighting Designer – Peter Morse

== Releases ==
On March 3, 2015, Shania Twain released Still the One: Live from Vegas. The set includes the entirety of the Shania: Still the One live concert and a 19-track live album.

== See also ==
- Let's Go!
