= Party for Two =

2004 single by Shania Twain

- Single cover for the pop version. The maxi single uses the same artwork, but with a red background.

Single by Shania Twain featuring Billy Currington or Mark McGrath

from the album Greatest Hits
- B-side: "I'm Holdin' On to Love (To Save My Life)"; "You're Still the One"
- Released: September 7, 2004
- Recorded: 2004
- Genre: Country pop; dance-pop
- Length: 3:32 (country mix); 3:31 (pop mix)
- Label: Mercury Nashville
- Songwriters: Robert John "Mutt" Lange; Shania Twain
- Producer: Robert John "Mutt" Lange

Shania Twain singles chronology
"It Only Hurts When I'm Breathing" (2004)	"Party for Two" (2004)	"Don't!" (2005)

Billy Currington singles chronology
"I Got a Feelin'" (2004)	"Party for Two" (2004)	"Must Be Doin' Somethin' Right" (2005)

Music videos
- "Party for Two" on YouTube; "Party for Two" (remix) on YouTube

"Party for Two" is a song by Canadian country singer-songwriter Shania Twain, recorded for her 2004 Greatest Hits compilation album. Written by Twain and then-husband Robert John "Mutt" Lange and produced by Lange, it was originally conceived as a return to country for Twain and planned as a duet with Toby Keith. Due to scheduling conflicts, he was instead replaced with newcomer and label-mate Billy Currington. Although no alternate version was initially planned, a pop remix featuring rock band Sugar Ray lead singer Mark McGrath was also recorded as well.

Released on September 7, 2004, it was received well by critics. Commercially, it was also successful. It would peak at number seven on the US Billboard Hot Country Songs chart, becoming Twain's 16th and most recent top-ten single but only the second for Currington. It was her last entry on the Billboard Hot 100 for the 2000s decade. Internationally it proved to be more successful, hitting top-ten in countries such as Austria, Twain's native Canada, and the United Kingdom. Remixes of the song were released for club play. It was nominated at the 2005 CMAs for Musical Event of the Year. As of 2023, "Party for Two" is certified Platinum by the RIAA for 1,000,000 certified units.

== Background and release ==
In 2004 at the end of the Up! Tour, Twain took a break before deciding to release a greatest hits album. She included 17 singles on the compilation. "Party for Two" was one of three new songs recorded for Greatest Hits, the others being "Don't!" and "I Ain't No Quitter". "Party for Two" was serviced to country radio as the lead single on September 7, 2004. It was released on October 25, 2004, in Australia, Germany, and for US adult contemporary radio. It was also released in Canada and the United Kingdom on November 2 and November 22.

Twain explained the song as "picking up where [she] left off on Up!." She initially planned to record "Party for Two" with American singer Toby Keith; however due to timing conflicts he was unavailable for recording. She wanted to record with someone completely opposite of her and so, Mercury Nashville president Luke Lewis introduced her to Billy Currington, then an up-and-coming singer. Currington described the experience of recording the song as "once in a lifetime" and that "both Twain and Mutt [Lange] made me feel at home."

== Composition ==
"Party for Two" was released in two versions: a pop version featuring Sugar Ray frontman Mark McGrath for pop and international audiences and a country version featuring Billy Currington for country audiences. Twain and her husband, Robert John "Mutt" Lange, wrote the song, with Lange handling production. According to the sheet music published at Musicnotes.com, "Party for Two" is written in the key of B major with a tempo of 122 beats per minute. The chord progression contains open fifths: E5–B5–F♯5, and the vocals span from E_{3} to G♯_{4}.

Lyrically, Twain entices a guy to come over for a party and while he is hesitant at first, he changes his mind once he finds out it is just for the two of them. She was adamant about the song being flirty instead of sexual.

== Critical reception ==
Stephen Thomas Erlewine of AllMusic, in his review for Greatest Hits, called the song "gleefully goofy." Country Universe rated the Currington version a B+, praising the "laid-back smolder" of his vocals while also liking Twain's "flirty, playful performance" of the verses. However, the publication rated the McGrath version a B−, saying that McGrath did not have "the character needed to sell a song of this ilk" and disliking the "poorly-aged" pop production when in comparison to the original country mix.

== Music video ==
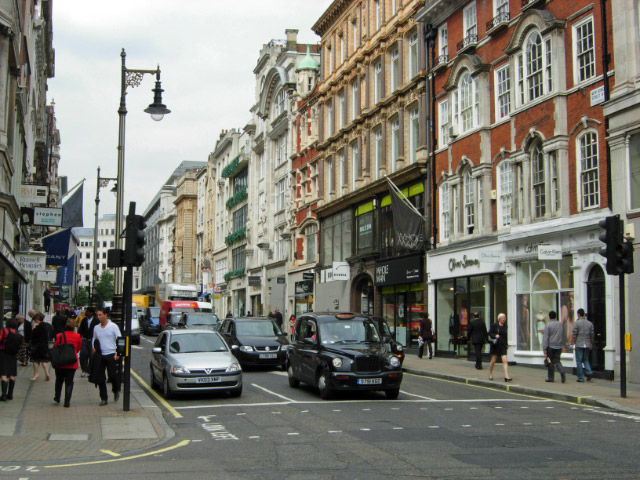
"Party for Two" was filmed in Mayfair, along New Bond Street.

Marcus Raboy directed the music videos for "Party for Two". It was filmed on August 28–29, 2004, in the Mayfair district of London, England. Two videos were filmed, each featuring either Currington or McGrath. The video shows Twain walking around town handing out invitations to movers, a waiter, and an artist to help her get ready for her "party for two" later that night. At the party, Twain and her guest end up swinging on a chandelier and smashing plates.

=== Release and reception ===
The country version was released to music stations such as CMT and GAC while the pop version was released to VH1, MuchMoreMusic, and other international stations. It proved to be a success, with the pop version won the MuchMusic Video Award for the MuchMoreMusic Video of the Year while the country version was nominated for Collaborative Video of the Year at the 2005 CMT Music Awards.

== Chart performance ==
"Party for Two" debuted on the US Billboard Hot Country Songs the week of September 18, 2004, at number 39. It rose to its peak position of number 7 on December 25, 2004, where it stayed for one week; it stayed 20 weeks overall on the chart. The single also peaked at number 58 on the all-genre Billboard Hot 100 and 58 on the Radio Songs chart. In November 2004, the track received a Spin Award from BDS Certified for 50,000 spins. By March 2005, the track received another award, this time for 100,000 spins. "Party for Two" debuted on the UK Singles Chart for the week of December 4, 2004, at number 10. It stayed in the UK charts for nine weeks. In German-speaking Europe, "Party for Two" peaked at numbers 6 and 7 in Austria and Germany. In Twain's home country of Canada, the single peaked atop the BDS Canada Airplay chart and peaked at number 2 on the sales-only Canadian Singles Chart. "Party for Two" also charted highly in Denmark, Portugal, Spain, and Scotland.

== Live performances ==
Twain first performed the country version of "Party for Two" on Good Morning America with Currington on November 5, 2004. She also performed the country version with him on the German music show Wetten, dass..?. Twain performed the pop version featuring McGrath for the first time on Dutch TV. She also performed the version featuring him at the 2004 Bambi Awards. Twain also performed the pop version with McGrath on the British morning show GMTV.

== Track listings ==
These are the formats of major releases.

UK maxi-CD single

1. "Party For Two" (Pop Version) – 3:32
2. "You're Still The One" (Live) – 3:28
3. "I'm Holding On To Love (To Save My Life)" (Live) – 3:24
4. "Party For Two" (Country Version) – 3:24
5. "Party For Two" (Almighty Downtown Radio Edit) – 3:37
6. Enhanced: "Party For Two" (Pop Version) – Music Video
7. Enhanced: "Party For Two" (Country Version) – Music Video

German and Canadian CD single

1. "Party For Two" (Pop Version with Intro) – 3:32
2. "You're Still The One" (Live) – 3:28
3. "I'm Holding On To Love (To Save My Life)" – 3:24
4. "Party For Two" (Country Version with Intro) – 3:29
5. Enhanced: "Party For Two" – Music Video

UK CD single

1. "Party For Two" (Pop Version) – 3:34
2. "Party For Two" (LMC Remix) – 6:18

European CD single

1. "Party For Two" (Pop Version with Intro) – 3:32
2. "Party For Two" (Country Version with Intro) – 3:29

German and European 3-inch CD single

1. "Party For Two" (Pop Version) – 3:32
2. "Party For Two" (Country Version) – 3:29

Europe 12" Remixes Vinyl

1. "Party For Two" (LMC Remix)
2. "Party For Two" (Almighty Downtown Mix)
3. "Party For Two (Kenny Hayes Mix)
4. "Party For Two (Almighty Uptown Mix)

US promotional CD single

1. "Party For Two" (duet with Billy Currington) – 3:33

== Official versions ==
Almighty Records provided six different remixes of the song.

- Country album version (3:32)
- Pop album version (3:32)
- Country version radio edit (3:26)
- Pop version radio edit (3:25)
- LMC Remix (6:37)
- LMC Remix Edit (6:19)
- Kenny Hayes Mix (5:46)
- Almighty Downtown Mix (6:46)
- Almighty Downtown Dub (6:46)
- Almighty Downtown Radio Edit (3:37)
- Almighty Uptown Mix (7:49)
- Almighty Uptown Dub (8:02)
- Almighty Uptown Radio Edit (3:30)

== Charts ==
=== Weekly charts ===
Chart (2004–2005)	Peak position
Austria (Ö3 Austria Top 40)	6
Belgium (Ultratip Bubbling Under Flanders)	5
Belgium (Ultratip Bubbling Under Wallonia)	8
Canada (Nielsen SoundScan)	2
Canada AC Top 30 (Radio & Records)	4
Canada Country Top 30 (Radio & Records)	3
Canada Hot AC Top 30 (Radio & Records)	8
Denmark (Tracklisten)	4
Germany (GfK)	7
Hungary (Rádiós Top 40)	21
Ireland (IRMA)	25
Netherlands (Single Top 100)	44
Norway (VG-lista)	11
Romania (Romanian Top 100)	39
Scottish Singles Sales (Official Charts)	8
Spain (Airplay Chart)	7
Sweden (Sverigetopplistan)	20
Switzerland (Schweizer Hitparade)	13
UK Singles (Official Charts)	10
US Billboard Hot 100	58
US Adult Contemporary (Billboard)	16
US Hot Country Songs (Billboard)	7

=== Year-end charts ===
Chart (2004)	Position
Germany (Media Control GfK)	81
US Hot Country Singles & Tracks (Billboard)	79
US Country (Radio & Records)	82

Chart (2005)	Position
Canada AC (Radio & Records)	20
US Hot Country Songs (Billboard)	75
US Adult Contemporary (Radio & Records)	68
US Country (Radio & Records)	72

== Certifications ==
Region	Certification	Certified units/sales
United States (RIAA)	Platinum	1,000,000^{‡}
^{‡} Sales+streaming figures based on certification alone.

== Release history ==
Release dates and formats for "Party for Two"
Region	Date	Format	Label	Ref.
United States	September 7, 2004	Country radio	Mercury Nashville	
Australia	October 25, 2004	CD single	Universal	
Germany	October 25, 2004	CD single	Universal	
United States	October 25, 2004	Adult contemporary radio; hot AC radio	Mercury	
Canada	November 2, 2004	CD single	Mercury	
United States	November 8, 2004	Contemporary hit radio	Mercury	
United Kingdom	November 22, 2004	CD single	Universal	
Russia	November 24, 2004	Contemporary hit radio	Universal	
