= Don't! =

2005 single by Shania Twain

Single by Shania Twain

from the album Greatest Hits
- B-side: "I'm Gonna Getcha Good!"; "From This Moment On"; "Party for Two"
- Released: January 18, 2005
- Genre: Country pop
- Length: 3:56
- Label: Mercury Nashville
- Songwriters: Robert John "Mutt" Lange; Shania Twain
- Producer: Robert John "Mutt" Lange

Shania Twain singles chronology
"Party for Two" (2004)	"Don't!" (2005)	"I Ain't No Quitter" (2005)

Music video
- "Don't!" on YouTube

"Don't!" is a song co-written and recorded by Canadian country music singer Shania Twain. It was released on January 18, 2005, to country and adult contemporary radio as the second single from her Greatest Hits compilation album. The song was written by Twain and then-husband Robert John "Mutt" Lange. The song was also included under the end credits of the 2005 film An Unfinished Life, and in the Brazilian soap opera América.

"Don't!" was a moderate commercial success, reaching the top 20 on the US Adult Contemporary chart as well as the Ultratip charts in both Flanders and Wallonia.

== Music video ==
Twain in the music video for "Don't!" wearing a white dress with a corset.

The music video for "Don't!", directed by Wayne Isham, was shot in Oaxaca, Mexico at Quinta Real Hotel and Yucca plantation. It was filmed on October 24, 2004, and released on January 7, 2005, to Great American Country. In 2006, CMT Canada named "Don't!" the eighth sexiest country music video.

In the video Twain rides a horse through rows of Yucca wearing a red dress, and walks around in the hotel wearing a white dress and corset. Near the end of the video, a tear runs down her face. The video is included on certain CD singles of "Don't!".

== Chart performance ==
"Don't!" debuted on the Billboard Hot Country Singles & Tracks chart the week of January 29, 2005, at number 44, Twain's fourth highest debut of all time, and highest of the week. The single spent 15 weeks on the chart and climbed to a peak position of number 24 on April 2, 2005, where it remained for one week.

Released to adult contemporary radio on March 28, 2005, "Don't!" debuted at number 29, the highest debut of the week, on April 16, 2005. The single spent 16 weeks on the chart and climbed to a peak position of number 18 on May 14, 2005, where it remained for four non-consecutive weeks. "Don't!" became Twain's tenth consecutive top 20 single there.

In the UK, "Don't!" appeared at its peak position of number 30 on March 12, 2005. This became, and remains, her lowest peaking single in that country, and only remained on the chart for three weeks. It fell to number 57 in its second week, then fell off the chart completely. It re-entered the chart for one more week at number 87. It was her last single to chart in the UK until her 2023 collaboration with Anne-Marie, "Unhealthy", reached the top 20 of the UK Singles Chart.

== Live Performances ==
Twain performed the song for the first time live on May 14, 2023 in Winnipeg during her Queen of Me Tour.

== Track listings ==
These are the formats for major releases.

Maxi CD single (UK & Germany)

1. "Don't" - 3:53
2. "I'm Gonna Getcha Good!" (Live) - 4:23
3. "From This Moment On" (Live) - 4:07
4. Enhanced: "Don't" - Music Video

UK CD single - Limited Edition

1. "Don't" - 3:55
2. "Party For Two" (Kenny Hayes Remix) - 5:43

Germany CD single

1. "Don't" - 3:55
2. "I'm Gonna Getcha Good! (Live) - 4:23

== Official versions ==
- Album Version (3:56)
- Radio Edit (3:30)

== Cover version ==
- Paula Fernandes covered the song on her Dust in the Wind album, released in 2007.

== Charts ==
Chart (2005)	Peak position
Belgium (Ultratip Bubbling Under Flanders)	15
Belgium (Ultratip Bubbling Under Wallonia)	18
Canada (Canadian Singles Chart)	24
Canada AC Top 30 (Radio & Records)	9
Canada Country Top 30 (Radio & Records)	4
Europe (European Hot 100 Singles)	58
Germany (GfK)	58
Ireland (IRMA)	48
Romania (Romanian Top 100)	77
Scottish Singles Sales (Official Charts)	25
UK Singles (Official Charts)	30
US Bubbling Under Hot 100 (Billboard)	22
US Adult Contemporary (Billboard)	18
US Hot Country Songs (Billboard)	24

== Release history ==
Release dates and formats for "Don't!"
Region	Date	Format	Label	Ref.
United States	January 18, 2005	Country radio	Mercury	
Germany	February 28, 2005	CD single	Mercury	
United Kingdom	February 28, 2005	CD single	Mercury	
