= It Only Hurts When I'm Breathing =

2004 single by Shania Twain

- US promo CD cover

Single by Shania Twain

from the album Up!
- Released: February 9, 2004
- Studio: Compass Point (Nassau, Bahamas); Officine Meccaniche (Milan, Italy); Windmill Lane (Dublin, Ireland)
- Genre: Country pop
- Length: 3:20
- Label: Mercury Nashville
- Songwriters: Shania Twain; Robert John "Mutt" Lange
- Producer: Robert John "Mutt" Lange

Shania Twain singles chronology
"When You Kiss Me" (2003)	"It Only Hurts When I'm Breathing" (2004)	"Party for Two" (2004)

Audio videos
- "It Only Hurts When I'm Breathing" (Green version) on YouTube; "It Only Hurts When I'm Breathing" (Red version) on YouTube; "It Only Hurts When I'm Breathing" (Blue version) on YouTube

"It Only Hurts When I'm Breathing" is a song recorded by Canadian singer Shania Twain. It was written by Twain and her then-husband Robert John "Mutt" Lange. It was released on February 9, 2004, as the eighth and final single from her fourth studio album, Up!. Disparate to the remainder of Up!, "It Only Hurts when I'm Breathing" is a ballad that Twain labeled to be the sole heartbreak song on the album. Musically, it lies within the country pop genre while its lyrics speak of misery. The song was not included in any of Twain's tours, but she performed the song for the Up! Live in Chicago video special in 2003. The performance was also used as a promotional music video for the single.

"It Only Hurts When I'm Breathing" received mixed reviews from music critics. Commercially, the single performed well in Canada, where it peaked at number four. It was also a minor hit in the United States, peaking at number 71 on the Billboard Hot 100 and at number 18 on the Hot Country Songs chart. American Idol contestant Michael Lynche performed a cover version of the single on a Twain-themed episode for the ninth season of the show.

== Background ==
After collaborating on her great successes The Woman in Me (1995) and Come on Over (1997), Twain and her then-husband Robert John "Mutt" Lange decided to take a musical hiatus. The two relocated to Switzerland, settled down, and had a child, Eja, in August 2001. Twain felt content and was in a very positive state of mind, which inspired Up! (2002). She and Lange conceptualized the album to be very positive, optimistic, and uplifting; they desired to evade dark subject matters, yet still be profound through optimism. In doing so, they co-wrote every track on Up!, in which few tracks were ballads, something Twain considered a small ratio compared to the nineteen songs on the album. She explained it was not done deliberately, but influenced by her and Lange's state of mind at the time, adding, "There just didn't seem to be enough room for [ballads]". One of the ballads was "It Only Hurts when I'm Breathing", which Twain deemed necessary to come down in tempo. She said the song was very powerful and, as with each track on Up!, was significant to her. Twain said of the track, "This is the only heartbreak song on the new CD. [...] a chance for all of us to catch our breath here." "It Only Hurts when I'm Breathing" was later selected as the eighth and final single from Up!, fifth to impact the North American music market. It was released to country radio on February 9, 2004 and to adult contemporary radio on March 22, 2004. A live CD single and digital download were taken from Up! Live in Chicago, and released on March 9, 2004, with the same cover as the video album. CD singles and 7" singles were later issued by Mercury Nashville Records on March 30, 2004.

== Music video ==
"It Only Hurts when I'm Breathing" is one of two music videos shot from Twain's Up! Live in Chicago special, the other being "She's Not Just a Pretty Face".

== Composition ==
"It Only Hurts when I'm Breathing" is a ballad that lies within a fine line of country pop, most instrumentation are typical of country music, yet it does not sound distinctively country. The country "Green" version is of three minutes and nineteen seconds in length, and the pop "Red" version is of three minutes and twenty seconds in length. Paul Cognata of The Daily Campus stated, "Twain decides to deeply cross the line into pop music in her song, 'It Only Hurts when I'm Breathing.' Since there isn't any type of country-feel in it, the song sounds like a typical pop ballad that could be found on Kiss 95.7." It is set in common time and has a slow tempo of 76 beats per minute. Written in the key of D♭ major, "It Only Hurts when I'm Breathing" follows the chord progression G–Am_{7}–F_{9}. Twain's vocals span two octaves, from A♭_{3} to D_{5}. Its lyrics reflect misery and burden.

== Reception ==
=== Critical reception ===
"It Only Hurts When I'm Breathing" received mixed reviews from music critics. Ron Rollins of Dayton Daily News believed the song was "catchier" under its pop format from the Red CD of Up!. Eric R. Danton of the Hartford Courant felt his heartstrings weakly tugged by "It Only Hurts when I'm Breathing", and added, "The whole endeavor feels like a calculated and spectacularly cynical attempt to make money while expending as little effort as possible." Carol Tannehill of The News-Sentinel called the song one of the hottest singles on country and pop radio at the time. Stephen Thomas Erlewine of Allmusic noted the song's absence from Twain's Greatest Hits (2004) album; however, he said it was not greatly missed. In 2004, "It Only Hurts when I'm Breathing" was listed as a "Winning Song" in the country genre by Broadcast Music Incorporated (BMI). The song was nominated for "Song of the Year" at the 2004 Canadian Country Music Association Awards, but lost to Carolyn Dawn Johnson's "Die of a Broken Heart".

=== Chart performance ===
"It Only Hurts When I'm Breathing" debuted at number fifty-seven in mid-March 2004, and eventually peaked at number four in mid-April 2004 on the Canadian Singles Chart. On the week ending May 8, 2004, "It Only Hurts when I'm Breathing" debuted at number seventy-six on the United States' main singles chart, the Billboard Hot 100. In the succeeding week, the track jumped to its peak position at number seventy-one. It spent a total of seven weeks on the Billboard Hot 100. On the week ending February 21, 2004, "It Only Hurts when I'm Breathing" entered the US Hot Country Singles & Tracks chart at number fifty. The following week, the track ascended to number forty-three, and, after thirteen weeks on the chart, on the week ending May 15, 2004, it reached its peak at number eighteen, where it remained for three consecutive weeks. In all, the single managed to remain aboard Hot Country Singles & Tracks for twenty weeks. "It Only Hurts when I'm Breathing" also charted on the US Adult Contemporary chart, where it peaked at number sixteen on the week ending May 29, 2004.

== Live performances ==
Twain first performed the song as part of her setlist for an outdoor concert on July 5, 2003, at Nowlan Park in Kilkenny, Ireland. She then performed it at another concert on July 12, 2003, at Hyde Park in London, England. The singer last performed "It Only Hurts when I'm Breathing" on July 27, 2003, at a free outdoor concert held in Grant Park in Chicago, filmed for the Up! Live in Chicago (2003) concert film. The singer donned a tan, multi-patterned halter top and black, sequined wide leg trousers, and performed sitting on a stool placed at the end of the runaway. The recording of the performance at Grant Park was used as a promotional music video for the single. The song was not included on Twain's Up! Tour.

== Cover version ==
Contestant Michael Lynche performed a cover version of "It Only Hurts when I'm Breathing" on a Twain-themed episode of the ninth season of the singing competition American Idol, aired on April 27, 2010. Lynche performed the contemporary R&B-oriented rendition of the song sitting on the staircase of the show's stage. His performance was received well by judges Ellen DeGeneres (who compared Lynche's delivery to that of Luther Vandross), Kara DioGuardi, and Randy Jackson; judge Simon Cowell felt Lynche's song selection was poor, deeming it too feminine for him. Sitting in the audience after serving as a guest mentor, Twain herself was moved to tears listening to Lynche's rendition. Eric Ditzian of MTV News desired for the contestant to tap into his R&B and soul music roots further and concluded, "Last night's performance was hardly the stuff of Luther Vandross, as Randy Jackson and Simon Cowell maintained, but it's a comparison that Mike should take to heart." Leslie Grey Steeler of The Palm Beach Post acknowledged Lynche was usually cheesy in his performances, but favored his rendition of "It Only Hurts when I'm Breathing", saying, "I loved it" and calling it "awesome". Mary T. Kelly of Salon.com commented, "Big Mike went back to good, ole country basics and sang the song sweet, simple and pure. Tammy Tyree would have been proud." Lynche was placed in the bottom three that week, and later eliminated.

== Track listings ==
- Live CD and digital Download
1. "It Only Hurts When I'm Breathing" (Live from Up! Live in Chicago) – 3:42
- CD and 7-inch single
1. "It Only Hurts When I'm Breathing" (Green Version) – 3:20
2. "It Only Hurts When I'm Breathing" (Red Version) – 3:19

== Charts ==
=== Weekly charts ===
Weekly chart performance for "It Only Hurts When I'm Breathing"
Chart (2004)	Peak position
Canada AC (Radio & Records)	3
Canada Country (Radio & Records)	4
US Billboard Hot 100	71
US Adult Contemporary (Billboard)	16
US Hot Country Songs (Billboard)	18

=== Year-end charts ===
Year-end chart performance for "It Only Hurts When I'm Breathing"
Chart (2004)	Position
US Adult Contemporary (Billboard)	28
US Hot Country Singles & Tracks (Billboard)	77

== Release history ==
Release dates and format(s) for "It Only Hurts When I'm Breathing"
Region	Date	Format(s)	Label(s)	Ref.
United States	February 9, 2004	country radio	Mercury Nashville	
United States	March 22, 2004	adult contemporary radio; hot adult contemporary radio	Mercury Nashville	
