= Swingin' with My Eyes Closed =

2017 single by Shania Twain

Single by Shania Twain

from the album Now
- Released: August 18, 2017
- Genre: Country; country pop; reggae
- Length: 3:33
- Label: Mercury Nashville
- Songwriter(s): Shania Twain
- Producer(s): Ron Aniello; Shania Twain

Shania Twain singles chronology
"Life's About to Get Good" (2017)	"Swingin' with My Eyes Closed" (2017)	"We Got Something They Don't" (2017)

Music video
- "Swingin' with My Eyes Closed" on YouTube

"Swingin’ with My Eyes Closed" is a song written and performed by Canadian singer-songwriter, Shania Twain. It was released on August 18, 2017, and serves as the second single from Twain's fifth studio album Now.

== Live performances ==
Twain debuted the single on June 16, 2017, on Today's Summer Concert series. She performed the song on The Tonight Show on August 16, 2017. Twain also performed the song as part of her set during the 2017 US Open, Opening Ceremony performance, on August 28, 2017. Twain performed the song as part of her set during an exclusive UK performance at Radio 2 Live in Hyde Park on 10 September 2017. She then performed the song on The Late Late Show with James Corden in October 2017.

== Release ==
The song premiered on August 17, 2017, on BBC Radio 2 and was released to streaming and music purchasing platforms on August 18, 2017.

== Music video ==
The music video for "Swingin' with My Eyes Closed" was released on September 29, 2017, and depicts Twain in a large house with two couples performing dance routines.

== Charts ==
Chart (2017)	Peak position
Scotland (OCC)	77
UK Singles Downloads (OCC)	91
