= Michael Lynche (album) =

Studio album by Michael Lynche
- Released: August 14, 2012
- Genre: R&B
- Length: 50:05
- Label: Big3
- Producers: Rob Chiarelli, Gharah Degeddingseze, Bill Edwards, Jamie Jones, Lynche, D'myreo Mitchell, Monte Neuble, Jason Pennock, Preach, Wayne Rodrigues, Tim Stewart

Singles from Michael Lynche
- 1. "Who's Gonna Love You More" Released: May 15, 2012; 2. "Today" Released: July 30, 2012

Michael Lynche is the self-titled debut album of R&B artist Michael Lynche. It was released by independent label Big3 Records on August 14, 2012, two years after Lynche placed fourth on the ninth season of American Idol. Lynche holds co-writing credits on all of its original songs. He collaborated with songwriters Charlie Brown, Rob Chiarelli, Maria Christensen Gharah Degeddingseze, David Glass, Jamie Jones, D'myreo Mitchell, Monte Neuble, Jason Pennock, Wayne Rodrigues, Tim Stewart, Ryan Tedder, and Ronnie Walton. Lynche also served as a producer on the album, along with Chiarelli, Degeddingseze, Jones, Mitchell, Neuble, Pennock, Rodrigues, Stewart, Bill Edwards, and Preach. In addition to twelve original songs, the album includes a cover of "This Woman's Work" by Kate Bush - a song that Lynche had performed while competing on American Idol.

The album was critically acclaimed. "Who's Gonna Love You More" was released as the lead single off of the album in May 2012; a music video and a lyric video of the song were both released in August. The album's second single, "Today" was released in July, and a lyric video of it was released in August.

== Writing and recording ==
The album took eighteen months to produce. Lynche signed with Big3 Records (an independent label based in his hometown of St. Petersburg, Florida) in September 2011; although by that time, he had already been working on an album for about half-a-year. Thirteen tracks are included, of which twelve are original songs; these were chosen from around thirty. Also included is a cover of Kate Bush's "This Woman's Work", which Lynche had performed on American Idol. Lynche co-wrote all of the original songs and also served as one of the album's producers. He has said that "finding the starting point for a song is always the hardest part." For ideas, he would keep a log in which he wrote down sayings and pieces of conversation that seemed interesting to him. He has said that Big3 Records never put any time restraints on him and gave him total creative freedom over the album. Lynche often chose to return to songs to rewrite, reproduce, or remix them, feeling that there was a perfect version to achieve for each one.

Lynche said that he tried to be more than just "Mr. R&B man" on the album, and that he did not want the album to only contain "old soul" music. Rather, he incorporated several diverse musical styles, saying, "I wanted to include a fun soul thing, a late-night R&B heavy thing, and something that morphs into an acoustic soul sound." The album explores Lynche's views on the various aspects of love, and many of the songs were inspired by his relationship with his wife. The album's first single, "Who's Gonna Love You More" was co-written with Jamie Jones and Jason Pennock - Jones is one of the lead singers of R&B/pop group All-4-One; Pennock has worked as a producer for All-4-One and is a part of Big3 Records. The song, which has been likened to the music of Luther Vandross, is in Lynche's own words, "a song about that declaration of love for whoever it is, your man, your woman, your partner, whoever it is. It’s saying that there’s nobody on this earth that’s going to love you like I love you." Pennock co-wrote seven of the album's other songs with Lynche, including "Love Is You", which Lynche has called one of his favorites on the album. Lynche said that the song started "in a small place", but developed into something much larger over time. Lynche also explored love from the perspective of a parent with the song "Baby Boo", which he wrote for his daughter Laila. Among Lynche's other collaborators on the album was dance-pop group 3rd Party's lead singer Maria Christensen, whom he had met while he was in New York before he tried out for American Idol. Christensen co-wrote the empowerment song "Somebody Save Me." The final song on the album, "Unstoppable," is about faith. Lynche co-wrote three songs with American Idol season 2 winner Ruben Studdard, although none of these were ultimately included on the album.

== Singles ==
The album's first single, "Who's Gonna Love You More" was released on May 15, 2012, and debuted on Urban AC radio on the twenty-first. It began at number 36 on the Adult R&B chart, and peaked at number 25 in September. The song also reached number 84 on the Hot R&B/Hip-Hop Songs chart. A music video for the song was released on August 8, and a lyric video was released on August 14.

The album's second single, "Today" was released to AC radio and smooth jazz radio on July 30, 2012. It became the most added song that week on the Smooth Jazz chart and the second most added song that week on the AC chart. It was released digitally on August 7. A lyric video of the song was released on August 15.

== Reception ==
One would be hard-pressed to find a debut that’s as focused and full of finesse as this CD is. He may have lost out on the American Idol crown, but Michael Lynche will convince anyone listening that it isn’t a game of checkers he’s playing, it’s chess…and the man is poised to win.

— Melody Charles in a review for soultracks.com.

Melody Charles of soultracks.com highly recommended the album and praised Lynche for taking a unique approach from other modern R&B artists. Discussing "Intoxicated" and "Speechless", she wrote that Lynche displays "increasingly rare facets in urbanized love songs: awe and vulnerability about his lady that aren’t restricted to how well she happens to fill out a dress." Charles noted that even when the album takes on sexual tones, as with "Lovers Symphony" and "Sex", Lynche chooses to emphasize sensuality, rather than sexual objectification. She felt that "Baby Boo" showed Lynche to be more versatile than many of his musical contemporaries, and considered his cover of Kate Bush's "This Woman's Work" to be "worth the price of an iTunes upload all by itself." Brinda Fuller Willis of the Jackson Advocate considered Lynche's vocal abilities superior to many current singers. She wrote that the album evokes similarities to Barry White and contains "some of the best R & B love songs on the market today." In her view, the album shows that Lynche has successfully "tapped into his own niche as a crooner of love."

In a review for Lynche's hometown newspaper, the Tampa Bay Times, Sean Daly compared Lynche to Luther Vandross, Barry White, and Al Green, and praised Lynch "for not copycatting the radio." Although Daly felt that "Today" and "Unstoppable" were "underwritten" and "cliche", he singled out first single "Who's Gonna Love You More", "This Woman's Work", "Sex", and "Crazy Gina" for praise, comparing the latter song to the music of Prince. Daly concluded that Lynche "could truly be a star someday." Guitar World writer James Woods gave the album a positive review on his blog. He called Michael Lynche "a sonically rich and lyrically inviting debut album", and felt that it perfectly combines elements of R&B, hip-hop, and jazz.

Somewhat less positive was Stephen Thomas Erlewine, writing for Allmusic, who gave the album two-and-a-half stars out of five. He called "Crazy Gina" one of the album's "liveliest numbers" and complimented Lyche's falsetto, but felt that the "seductive groove album" approach meant that none of the songs were able to "really pop out."

Soultracks.com listed Michael Lynche as an honorable mention in its list of the best albums of 2012.

Mark Franklin of the York Dispatch's blog Idol Chatter chose "Crazy Gina" as the eighth best 2012 song by an American Idol alumni. He called it "a funky delight" and suggested that Lynche's follow-up album should contain more songs like it.

== Track listing ==
No.	Title	Writer(s)	Length
1.	"Crazy Gina"	Jamie Jones, Michael Lynche, Monte Neuble, Jason Pennock, Tim Stewart	4:03
2.	"Intoxicated"	Lynche, Ryan Tedder	3:05
3.	"Who's Gonna Love You More"	Jones, Lynche, Pennock	4:01
4.	"Speechless"	Gharah Degeddingseze, Lynche, Pennock	4:32
5.	"Love Is You"	Lynche, Pennock	3:28
6.	"Fragile"	Lynche, Ronnie Walton	3:19
7.	"Lovers Symphony"	Lynche, D'myreo Mitchell, Pennock	5:21
8.	"Sex"	Lynche, Pennock	2:59
9.	"This Woman's Work"	Kate Bush	4:06
10.	"Baby Boo"	Charlie Brown, David Glass, Lynche, Wayne Rodrigues	4:12
11.	"Today"	Lynche, Pennock, Walton	3:48
12.	"Somebody Save Me"	Rob Chiarelli, Maria Christensen, Lynche	3:51
13.	"Unstoppable"	Lynche, Pennock, Walton	3:18

== Personnel ==
Credits adapted from AllMusic.

- Michael Lynche - Vocals, guitar, production

Additional vocals

- Ayeasha Anglin - background vocals
- Maria Christensen - background vocals
- Angie Fisher - background vocals
- Diane Gordon - background vocals
- Delisha Thomas - background vocals

Additional Musicians

- Lowell Adams - cello
- Kenneth Allman - keyboards
- Shane Anderson - keyboards
- Jamaal Andrews - bass
- Aric Brian - trumpet
- Rob Chiarelli - keyboards
- Gharah Degeddingseze - keyboards
- Tim Eddy - baritone saxophone
- David Garcia - acoustic guitar
- David Glass - guitar
- The Heavy Duty Horns - horn
- Andrew Marsh - drums
- D'myreo Mitchell - keyboards
- Monte Neuble - keyboards
- Jason Pennock - keyboards, piano
- Jeremy Powell - tenor saxophone
- Preach - keyboards
- Wayne Rodrigues - keyboards
- Mike Silvia - drums
- Tim Stewart - guitar, electric guitar
- Guy Walker - electric guitar

Technical personnel

- Kenneth Allman - programming
- Shane Anderson - programming
- Jim Beeman - engineering, mixing
- Rob Chiarelli - engineering, mixing, production
- Justin Colen - engineering assistance, engineering
- Gharah Degeddingseze - production, programming
- Bill Edwards - executive producer
- Chris Gehringer - mastering
- Jamie Jones - production, programming, vocal recording
- Sean Kelly - horn engineer
- D'myreo Mitchell - production, programming
- Monte Neuble - production
- Jason Pennock - production, programming, vocal production
- Preach - production
- Wayne Rodrigues - drum programming, engineering, Pro Tools
- Tim Stewart - production

Misc.

- Rob Chiarelli - instrumentation
- Gharah Degeddingseze - string arrangements
- Rick Delgado - photography
- Richie "Britley" Hughes - art direction
- Monte Neuble - instrumentation
- Jason Pennock - horn arrangements, instrumentation
- Preach - instrumentation

== Charts ==
=== Singles ===
Year	Title	Peak chart positions	
Year	Title	US Adult R&B	US R&B /HH
2012	"Who's Gonna Love You More"	25	84
2012	"Today"	—	—
