= Michael Lynche =

American singer

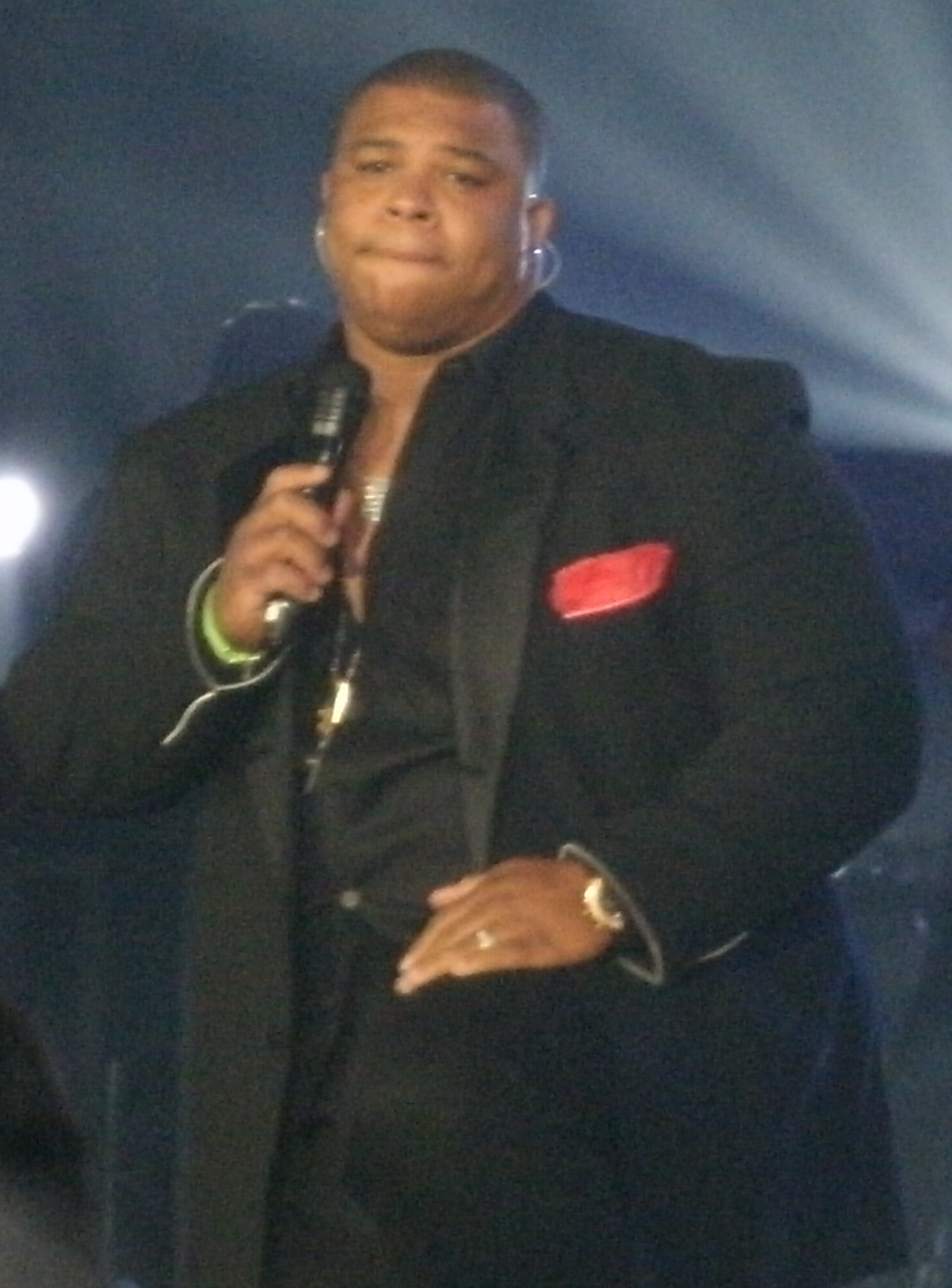
- Michael Lynche in July 2010.

Background information
- Also known as: Big Mike
- Born: Michael Alexander Lynche; May 31, 1983 (age 43)
- Origin: Saint Petersburg, Florida, United States
- Genres: R&B, pop
- Occupation: Singer
- Instruments: Vocals, guitar
- Years active: 2009–present
- Label: Big3 Records

Michael Alexander Lynche (born May 31, 1983) is an American R&B singer and songwriter who was the fourth place finalist on the ninth season of American Idol and the second finalist on the series ever to receive the judges' save, which had been introduced in the prior season. Lynche went on to release a self-titled debut album in 2012. The lead single from that album, "Who's Gonna Love You More", reached the top twenty-five on Billboard's Adult R&B chart. Since the release of his album, he has formed a live touring group, Michael Lynche and the Black Saints.

== Early life ==
Lynche was born to Michele and Marque Lynche, Sr. His older brother Marque, Jr., a former mouseketeer on the All-New Mickey Mouse Club from 1993 to 1995, and semi-finalist on the third season of American Idol, died on December 6, 2015. His musical influences are Lauryn Hill, Maxwell and Al Green.

Before Idol, Lynche was a football player at Gibbs High School and the University of Central Florida. He played two seasons at University of Central Florida and later dropped out in 2003 to take care of his ailing mother. His mother died the following year of pancreatic cancer.

== American Idol ==
Lynche auditioned in Orlando, Florida on July 9, 2009. He sang Unchained Melody by Alex North to all four judges, including guest judge Kristin Chenoweth.

During Hollywood Week, Lynche received news via telephone that his wife, Christa, had gone into labor and given birth to his daughter Laila Rose. A week after Hollywood Week taping ended, his father revealed to a local newspaper that his son had made it into American Idol's Top 24, thus violating a confidentiality agreement with the show. Fox declined to comment on the report.

Since Lynche was among the top 10 finalists, he was part of the American Idol 2010 summer tour.

On April 7, 2010, Lynche was the lowest vote-getter and would have been eliminated from the competition, but the judges used their only save on him.

Lynche was eliminated from the competition on May 12, 2010, thus finishing in fourth place.

=== Performances ===
Week #	Theme	Song choice	Original artist	Order #	Result
Audition	Auditioner's Choice	"Unchained Melody"	Todd Duncan	N/A	Advanced
Hollywood	First Solo	"Waiting on the World to Change"	John Mayer	N/A	Advanced
Hollywood	Group Performance	"Get Ready"	The Temptations	N/A	Advanced
Hollywood	Second Solo	"I'm Yours"	Jason Mraz	N/A	Advanced
Top 24 (12 Men)	Billboard Hot 100 Hits	"This Love"	Maroon 5	9	Safe
Top 20 (10 Men)	Billboard Hot 100 Hits	"It's a Man's Man's Man's World"	James Brown	1	Safe
Top 16 (8 Men)	Billboard Hot 100 Hits	"This Woman's Work"	Kate Bush	8	Safe
Top 12	The Rolling Stones	"Miss You"	The Rolling Stones	1	Safe
Top 11	Billboard No. 1 Hits	"When a Man Loves a Woman"	Percy Sledge	6	Safe
Top 10	R&B/Soul	"Ready for Love"	India.Arie	3	Safe
Top 9	Lennon–McCartney	"Eleanor Rigby"	The Beatles	4	Saved^{1}
Top 9^{2}	Elvis Presley	"In the Ghetto"	Elvis Presley	7	Safe
Top 7	Inspirational	"Hero"	Chad Kroeger	6	Safe
Top 6	Shania Twain	"It Only Hurts When I'm Breathing"	Shania Twain	2	Bottom 3^{3}
Top 5	Frank Sinatra	"The Way You Look Tonight"	Fred Astaire	4	Bottom 2^{4}
Top 4	Songs of the Cinema	Solo "Will You Be There" — Free Willy	Michael Jackson	2	Eliminated
Top 4	Songs of the Cinema	Duet "Have You Ever Really Loved a Woman?" — Don Juan DeMarco with Casey James	Bryan Adams	6	Eliminated

- ^Note 1 Lynche received the lowest number of votes; however, the judges decided to use their one save for the season to allow him to remain in the competition, resulting in two eliminations the following week.
- ^Note 2 Due to the judges using their one save to save Lynche, the Top 9 remained intact for another week.
- ^Note 3 Lynche was saved first from elimination.
- ^Note 4 When Ryan Seacrest announced the results in the particular night, Lynche was in the bottom two but declared safe when Aaron Kelly was eliminated.

== Post Idol ==
After participating on American Idol, Lynche joined the rest of the ninth season Top 10 on the American Idols Live! Tour 2010. His 3-song set included "This Woman's Work" by Kate Bush, "Ready for Love" by India.Arie, and "My Love" by Justin Timberlake. He also appeared alongside Casey James to perform their duet, "Have You Ever Really Loved a Woman" by Bryan Adams during James' set. He signed to Big3 Records and released two singles from his self-titled debut album: "Who's Gonna Love You More" and "Today". The former peaked at No. 25 on Billboard's Adult R&B chart and at No. 84 on Billboard's Hot R&B/Hip-Hop chart. The latter reached No. 39 on Mediabase's Adult Contemporary chart.

Lynche went on a diet and lost ninety pounds, while recording his debut album. Since the release of his album, he has performed live shows as lead singer of the group Michael Lynche and the Black Saints. He has also collaborated with conductor Jeff Tyzik on live orchestra shows. In 2012, Lynche released the four-track EP Christmas Gift, which features two original songs - the title track and "Every Merry Christmas".

In December 2015, The Oakland Press reported that Lynche was in the process of developing a second album. An original song, "There Will Be Love", which was written for that album, has been performed by Lynche during his concerts and TV appearances.

In 2018, Lynche was cast in the independent comedy film American Reject, which was directed by Marlo Hunter and written by Kathleen Elizabeth Monteleone, who stars in the film; Monteleone drew inspiration for the screenplay from her experience competing on the reality television series Grease: You're the One That I Want! American Reject was released through video on demand by 1091 Pictures on April 12, 2022. The film features original songs written by composer Derek Gregor and lyricist Selda Sahin.

== Discography ==
=== Albums ===
Title	Album details	Peak chart positions	Sales
Title	Album details	US	Sales
Michael Lynche	Release date: August 14, 2012; Label: Big3 Records; Formats: CD, digital download	—	

=== EPs ===
Year	Title
2012	Christmas Gift

=== Singles ===
Year	Title	Peak chart positions	
Year	Title	US Adult R&B	US R&B /HH
2012	"Who's Gonna Love You More"	25	84
2012	"Today"	—	—
