= Life's About to Get Good =

Single by Shania Twain

from the album Now
- Released: June 15, 2017
- Genre: Country pop
- Length: 3:40
- Label: Mercury Nashville
- Songwriter(s): Shania Twain
- Producer(s): Ron Aniello; Matthew Koma; Shania Twain

Shania Twain singles chronology
"Endless Love" (2012)	"Life's About to Get Good" (2017)	"Swingin' with My Eyes Closed" (2017)

Music video
- "Life's About to Get Good" on YouTube

"Life's About to Get Good" is a song written and recorded by Canadian singer and songwriter Shania Twain. Produced by Twain, Matthew Koma and Ron Aniello, it was released on June 15, 2017 as the lead single from her fifth studio album Now. As of October 2017, "Life's About to Get Good" has sold 36,485 copies in the United States. It was Twain's first single in five years. Twain performed the song on her Now Tour and Let's Go! residency.

== Background and composition ==
Twain formally announced the track as her new single prior to the 2017 Stagecoach Festival. The track was written by Twain and produced by Matthew Koma and Ron Aniello. Rolling Stone's Jon Freeman describes the song as, "a bouncy, optimistic number about moving from troubled times into better days."

The song is written in the key of B♭ major with a tempo of 100 beats per minute in common time. The song follows a chord progression of B♭–C–E♭–B♭, and Twain's vocals span from F_{3} to B♭_{4}.

== Live performances ==
Twain premiered the single on April 29, 2017, at the Stagecoach Festival. She performed the song on Today's Summer Concert series on June 16, 2017. It was included in her set on September 10, 2017 during her exclusive UK performance at Radio 2 Live in Hyde Park. During her appearance on the 2017 season finale of America's Got Talent, Twain performed the song along with "You're Still the One" with 4th runner up Mandy Harvey.

== Release ==
The song premiered on June 15, 2017, on BBC Radio 2 and was released to streaming and music purchasing platforms.

== Music video ==
A music video was shot in the Dominican Republic in June 2017. It was directed by Mathew Cullen and released on July 26, 2017. It shows Twain ending up in a tropical resort after reminiscing about her past. The video contains references to iconic fashion statements set by Twain in some of her previous videos, such as the "Man! I Feel Like a Woman!" and "That Don't Impress Me Much" outfits.

== Critical reception ==
Rolling Stone writer Jon Freeman writes, "the tune has a touch of Jeff Lynne's hyper-melodic work with Electric Light Orchestra in its DNA, from the stacked harmonies to the bright combination of chords". Andrew Unterberger of Billboard calls the track, "a rollicking anthem of folk-pop perseverance with a gently throbbing pulse", and "It's marvelous, it's irresistible – it's Come On Over-worthy, which 20 years later is still pretty much the highest compliment you can give to a song of its ilk".

== Charts ==
=== Weekly charts ===
Chart (2017)	Peak position
Belgium (Ultratip Bubbling Under Flanders)	26
Canada (Canadian Hot 100)	70
Canada Country (Billboard)	26
Scotland (OCC)	45
UK Singles Downloads (OCC)	64
US Adult Contemporary (Billboard)	12
US Country Airplay (Billboard)	36
US Hot Country Songs (Billboard)	33

=== Year end charts ===
Chart (2017)	Position
US Adult Contemporary (Billboard)	40

== Certifications ==
Region	Certification	Certified units/sales
Canada (Music Canada)	Gold	40,000^{‡}
^{‡} Sales+streaming figures based on certification alone.

== Release history ==
List of release dates, showing region, release format, and reference
Region	Date	Format(s)	Label	Ref
Various	June 15, 2017	Digital download	Mercury Nashville	
Italy	June 15, 2017	Contemporary hit radio	Universal	
United Kingdom	June 15, 2017	Hot adult contemporary	Virgin EMI	
United States	June 19, 2017	Country radio	Mercury Nashville	
