= Greatest Hits (Shania Twain album) =

Greatest hits album by Shania Twain
- Released: November 8, 2004
- Recorded: 1994–2004
- Genres: Country; pop
- Length: 77:45 (North American edition); 77:07 (International edition)
- Label: Mercury Nashville
- Producer: Robert John "Mutt" Lange

Shania Twain chronology
Up! (2002)	Greatest Hits (2004)	Still the One: Live from Vegas (2015)

Singles from Greatest Hits
- 1. "Party for Two" Released: September 7, 2004; 2. "Don't!" Released: January 18, 2005; 3. "I Ain't No Quitter" Released: May 2, 2005

Professional ratings
Review scores
Source	Rating
AllMusic	5/5 stars
PopMatters	8/10 stars

Greatest Hits is the first greatest hits album by Canadian singer-songwriter Shania Twain, released on November 8, 2004, by Mercury Nashville. The album contains seventeen of Twain's top ten hits, including all of her seven number one hits on the Hot Country Songs. Excluded from the track list is Twain's self-titled debut album, of which no songs were included. Some songs are included in their pop versions such as "That Don't Impress Me Much" and "I'm Gonna Getcha Good!".

Three new songs were recorded specifically for the compilation and were all released as singles: "Party for Two" (featuring either Mark McGrath or Billy Currington), "Don't!", and "I Ain't No Quitter". "Party for Two" went on to peak at number seven on the Hot Country Songs chart and peaked within the top ten in six other countries. "Don't!" was a moderate hit, peaking within the top twenty on the Adult Contemporary chart and the top 40 in the UK. "I Ain't No Quitter" was one of Twain's least successful singles, becoming her first since "God Bless the Child" to miss the top 40 at US country.

Greatest Hits was a commercial success; It debuted at number two on the Billboard 200 chart and at number one on the Top Country Albums chart with 530,000 copies sold, staying there for eleven consecutive weeks. The album was also the highest-selling country album in the US for 2005, and was certified Diamond in Canada 4× platinum in the US and 3× platinum in the UK. Additionally, Greatest Hits was recognized by Guinness World Records as the fastest-selling greatest hits album by a female artist in the US. As of December 2019, the album has sold 4.4 million copies in the US. Greatest Hits also debuted at number one in Canada with first-week sales of 92,600.

Greatest Hits was released on vinyl for the first time on November 17, 2023. It is available in four versions: a standard black vinyl, and three limited editions vinyls: opaque blue, baby pink, and Coke bottle clear. The vinyl release contains two additional songs from Twain's studio albums released after Greatest Hits initial release: "Life's About to Get Good" from Twain's fifth studio album Now (2017) and "Giddy Up!" from her sixth studio album Queen of Me (2023).

== Content ==
Greatest Hits includes 17 of Twain's previous singles. Three selections from her then-most recent album Up! (2002) are included, which were "I'm Gonna Getcha Good!", "Forever and for Always", and "Up!". The first two are included in their "red" (pop) versions, while the title track, in North American and Australian versions, is included in its "green" (country) version. "Ka-Ching!" was included exclusively in the European edition as it was a huge success in that region. Eight singles from Come On Over (1997) were included. Some, like "That Don't Impress Me Much", are notably included in their pop version. Six of the eight singles from The Woman in Me (1995) are on Greatest Hits. Notably absent from the track list is Twain's 1993 self-titled debut album, of which no songs were included.

Three new songs were recorded for the compilation. The first of the new tracks is "Party for Two". Twain recorded it as a duet with both Sugar Ray lead singer Mark McGrath and country musician Billy Currington. The song is lyrically about Twain enticing a guy to come to a party, which he's at first hesitant but when Twain shows it's just for the two of them he decides to join. The pop mix featuring McGrath was released to pop, adult contemporary, and international markets; likewise, the country version featuring Currington was released to country radio. The country version was not included in the European version of Greatest Hits but was included as a b-side on the CD single for "Party for Two". The second song included on the compilation is the adult contemporary influenced country ballad "Don't!". "Don't!" lyrically involves Twain wishing a partner for forgiveness. The third and final song included on Greatest Hits is the pure-country "I Ain't No Quitter". The song lyrically speaks of Twain sticking with an overconfident and brassy man.

In the 2023 reissue of Greatest Hits, two songs from Twain's later career were included. The first is "Life's About to Get Good", which was originally on her fifth studio album Now (2017). The second song that was included in the reissue is "Giddy Up!", included on her sixth studio album Queen of Me (2023).

== Singles ==
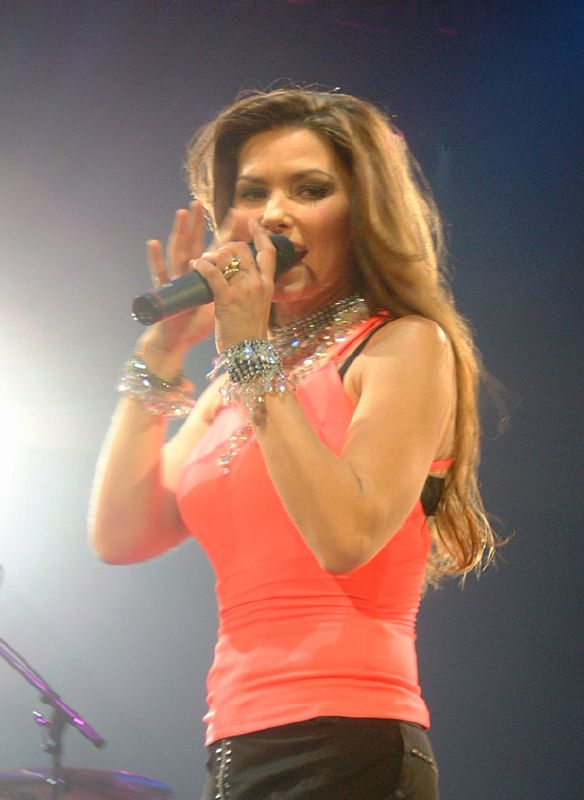
Twain (pictured in 2004) achieved the final top-ten country hit of her career with "Party for Two".

"Party for Two" was released as the lead single from Greatest Hits, released on September 7, 2004. Proving to become one of her last hits, it made its debut on the US Billboard Hot Country Songs chart the week of September 18, 2004, at number 39, becoming the "Hot Shot Debut" of the week. It would reach its peak position of number 7 on December 25, 2004, becoming Twain's 16th and final top-ten country single to date. The track also became a decently sized A/C hit, hitting number 16 on the US Adult Contemporary chart. Internationally, the song reach the top ten in the United Kingdom, Austria, Denmark, and Canada. The track would be nominated at the 2005 CMA Awards for Musical Event of the Year, which it lost to George Strait and Lee Ann Womack's "Good News, Bad News".

"Don't!" was released as the second single from the album on January 18, 2005. Twain did not promote the single at the time of its release, as she was battling Lyme disease and was unable to perform. It peaked at number 24 on the US country airplay chart, her first single since "Rock This Country!" (2000) to miss the top-twenty. The track failed to enter the Billboard Hot 100, although it still peaked at number 22 on the Bubbling Under Hot 100 chart. In Twain's native Canada however, it was a success, hitting numbers four and nine on the Radio & Records Canada Country and AC charts. "Don't!" became Twain's worst-performing single in the United Kingdom, peaking at number 30.

"I Ain't No Quitter" was serviced to country radio stations on May 2, 2005, as the third and final single. Despite being seen as a potential summer anthem, it became one of Twain's least successful singles in part due to lack of promotion. Entering at number 55 on the US Billboard Hot Country Songs chart on May 21, 2005, it reached a dismal peak of number 45 on the chart and spent only 8 weeks in total. It was Twain's first single since "God Bless the Child" (1996) to miss the top-forty. It was still a success in Canada, hitting number 8 on the country chart.

== Commercial performance ==
Greatest Hits debuted at number two on the Billboard 200, selling 530,000 copies in its first week. The album was blocked from the number one spot by Eminem's Encore, which sold 710,000 copies in its debut week. The Guinness World Records recognizes Greatest Hits as the fastest-selling greatest hits album of all time by a female artist in the US. On the Top Country Albums chart, Greatest Hits immediately debuted at number one. Greatest Hits spent eleven non-consecutive weeks at number one and was the best-selling country album of 2005. It has spent 271 weeks on the chart to date. Greatest Hits debuted at number one on the Canadian Albums Chart on November 27, 2004, and spent five weeks at number one. It has charted for 139 weeks in the country. Greatest Hits also became Shania's fourth consecutive Diamond album in Canada.

Internationally, the compilation was a success. Greatest Hits debuted at its peak position of number six on the UK Albums Chart, selling 53,162 copiesin its first week on November 20, 2004; it spent two non-consecutive weeks at its peak and spent 31 weeks on the chart. The album debuted at number three in both Germany and Austria while debuting at number four in Switzerland. The album also cracked the top ten in Australia, France, Ireland, New Zealand, and Scotland.

== Track listing ==
All tracks are written by Shania Twain and Robert John "Mutt" Lange, except for "You Win My Love" written by Lange.

North American and Australian version
No.	Title	Original album	Length
1.	"Forever and for Always" (red radio edit)	Up! (2002)	4:03
2.	"I'm Gonna Getcha Good!" (red radio edit)	Up!	4:02
3.	"Up!" (green album version)	Up!	2:53
4.	"Come On Over"	Come On Over (1997)	2:54
5.	"Man! I Feel Like a Woman!"	Come On Over	3:54
6.	"That Don't Impress Me Much" (dance mix, Australian tour edit)	Come On Over	4:27
7.	"From This Moment On" (the right single mix)	Come On Over	3:55
8.	"Honey, I'm Home"	Come On Over	3:37
9.	"You're Still the One" (country version w/o intro)	Come On Over	3:15
10.	"Don't Be Stupid (You Know I Love You)"	Come On Over	3:35
11.	"Love Gets Me Every Time"	Come On Over	3:33
12.	"No One Needs to Know"	The Woman in Me (1995)	3:03
13.	"You Win My Love" (radio edit)	The Woman in Me	3:45
14.	"(If You're Not in It for Love) I'm Outta Here!" (radio edit)	The Woman in Me	3:48
15.	"The Woman in Me (Needs the Man in You)" (radio edit)	The Woman in Me	3:57
16.	"Any Man of Mine"	The Woman in Me	4:06
17.	"Whose Bed Have Your Boots Been Under?" (radio edit)	The Woman in Me	3:59
18.	"Party for Two" (with Mark McGrath)	Previously unreleased	3:31
19.	"Don't!"	Previously unreleased	3:56
20.	"Party for Two" (with Billy Currington)	Previously unreleased	3:31
21.	"I Ain't No Quitter"	Previously unreleased	3:30
Total length:			77:45

International version
No.	Title	Original album	Length
1.	"Forever and for Always" (red radio edit)	Up!	4:03
2.	"I'm Gonna Getcha Good!" (red radio edit)	Up!	4:02
3.	"Up!" (red album version)	Up!	2:53
4.	"Ka-Ching!" (red album version)	Up!	3:21
5.	"Come On Over"	Come On Over	2:54
6.	"Man! I Feel Like a Woman!" (international version radio edit)	Come On Over	3:54
7.	"That Don't Impress Me Much" (dance mix, Australian tour edit)	Come On Over	4:27
8.	"From This Moment On" (the right single mix)	Come On Over	3:55
9.	"Honey, I'm Home"	Come On Over	3:37
10.	"You're Still the One" (country version w/o intro)	Come On Over	3:15
11.	"Don't Be Stupid (You Know I Love You)"	Come On Over	3:35
12.	"Love Gets Me Every Time"	Come On Over	3:33
13.	"No One Needs to Know"	The Woman in Me	3:03
14.	"You Win My Love" (radio edit)	The Woman in Me	3:45
15.	"(If You're Not in It for Love) I'm Outta Here!" (radio edit)	The Woman in Me	3:48
16.	"The Woman in Me (Needs the Man in You)" (radio edit)	The Woman in Me	3:57
17.	"Any Man of Mine"	The Woman in Me	4:07
18.	"Whose Bed Have Your Boots Been Under?" (radio edit)	The Woman in Me	3:59
19.	"Party for Two" (with Mark McGrath)	Previously unreleased	3:31
20.	"Don't!"	Previously unreleased	3:56
21.	"I Ain't No Quitter"	Previously unreleased	3:30
Total length:			77:07

2023 reissued version
No.	Title	Original album	Length
22.	"Life's About to Get Good"	Now (2017)	3:43
23.	"Giddy Up!"	Queen of Me (2023)	2:42
Total length:			84:10

== Music videos ==
1. "Party for Two" (featuring either Mark McGrath or Billy Currington)
2. "Don't!"
3. "I Ain't No Quitter"

== Personnel ==
- Bruce Bouton – pedal steel guitar
- Larry Byrom – electric guitar, acoustic guitar, slide guitar
- Joe Chemay – bass guitar, fretless bass
- B.J. Cole – dobro, pedal steel guitar
- Billy Crain – slide guitar
- Billy Currington – duet vocals on "Party for Two" (country version)
- Diamond Duggal – percussion
- Simon Duggal – percussion
- Glen Duncan – fiddle
- Stuart Duncan – fiddle
- Larry Franklin – fiddle
- Paul Franklin – pedabro, pedal steel guitar
- Carl Gorodetzky – string contractor
- Gavin Greenaway – string arrangements
- Rob Hajacos – fiddle
- David Hamilton – string arrangements, strings
- Aubrey Haynie – fiddle
- John Hobbs – organ, Wurlitzer
- Dann Huff – six-string bass guitar, 12-string electric guitar, electric guitar, electric sitar, sound effects, talk box guitar, tic tac bass, wah-wah guitar
- Ronn Huff – string arrangements
- John Hughey – pedal steel guitar
- David Hungate – bass guitar
- The Irish Film Orchestra – strings
- John Barlow Jarvis – piano, Wurlitzer
- Nick Jeca – clapping
- Robert John "Mutt" Lange – clapping, background vocals
- Paul Leim – drums, percussion, door slam
- Mark McGrath – duet vocals on "Party for Two" (pop version)
- Terry McMillan – cowbell, harmonica, harp, stomping
- Carl Marsh – string arrangements, strings
- Brent Mason – electric guitar
- Joey Miskulin – accordion
- The Nashville String Machine – strings
- Michael Omartian – piano
- Matt Rollings – piano
- Olle Romo – programming
- Joe Spivey – fiddle
- Aurther Stead – organ, piano, Wurlitzer
- Michael Thompson – bouzouki, e-bow, electric guitar, slide guitar
- Shania Twain – clapping, footsteps, lead vocals, background vocals
- Biff Watson – acoustic guitar, electric guitar, nylon string guitar
- John Willis – banjo, bouzouki, acoustic guitar, mandolin
- Jonathan Yudkin – cello, fiddle, mandolin, violin

== Charts ==
=== Weekly charts ===
Chart (2004–05)	Peak position
Australian Albums (ARIA)	10
Austrian Albums (Ö3 Austria)	3
Belgian Albums (Ultratop Flanders)	18
Belgian Albums (Ultratop Wallonia)	26
Canadian Albums (Billboard)	1
Danish Albums (Hitlisten)	14
Dutch Albums (Album Top 100)	14
European Albums (Top 100)	4
French Compilations (SNEP)	6
German Albums (Offizielle Top 100)	3
Hungarian Albums (MAHASZ)	24
Irish Albums (IRMA)	6
Japanese Albums (Oricon)	33
New Zealand Albums (RMNZ)	10
Norwegian Albums (VG-lista)	14
Portuguese Albums (AFP)	16
Quebec (ADISQ)	2
Scottish Albums (Official Charts)	2
South African Albums (RISA)	15
Spanish Albums (PROMUSICAE)	26
Swedish Albums (Sverigetopplistan)	14
Swiss Albums (Schweizer Hitparade)	4
Taiwanese Albums (Five Music)	14
UK Albums (Official Charts)	6
UK Country Compilation Albums (OCC)	1
US Billboard 200	2
US Top Country Albums (Billboard)	1

=== Year-end charts ===
Chart (2004)	Position
Australian Albums (ARIA)	92
Australian County Albums (ARIA)	4
Austrian Albums (Ö3 Austria)	63
Danish Albums (Hitlisten)	59
Hungarian Albums (MAHASZ)	91
Swedish Albums (Sverigetopplistan)	88
Swiss Albums (Schweizer Hitparade)	46
UK Albums (OCC)	28
US Billboard 200	133
US Top Country Albums (Billboard)	21
Worldwide Albums (IFPI)	7
Chart (2005)	Position
Australian County Albums (ARIA)	3
German Albums (Offizielle Top 100)	99
Swiss Albums (Schweizer Hitparade)	56
UK Albums (OCC)	167
US Billboard 200	9
US Top Country Albums (Billboard)	1
Chart (2006)	Position
Australian County Albums (ARIA)	28
US Top Country Albums (Billboard)	49
Chart (2007)	Position
Australian County Albums (ARIA)	40
Chart (2009)	Position
Australian County Albums (ARIA)	37
Chart (2010)	Position
Australian County Albums (ARIA)	18
Chart (2011)	Position
Australian County Albums (ARIA)	27
Chart (2012)	Position
Australian County Albums (ARIA)	24
Chart (2013)	Position
Australian County Albums (ARIA)	32
Chart (2014)	Position
Australian County Albums (ARIA)	22
Chart (2015)	Position
Australian County Albums (ARIA)	4
Chart (2016)	Position
Australian County Albums (ARIA)	19
Chart (2017)	Position
Australian County Albums (ARIA)	9
US Top Country Albums (Billboard)	81
Chart (2018)	Position
Australian County Albums (ARIA)	7
US Top Country Albums (Billboard)	75
Chart (2019)	Position
Australian County Albums (ARIA)	20
Chart (2020)	Position
Australian County Albums (ARIA)	25
US Top Country Albums (Billboard)	55
Chart (2021)	Position
Australian County Albums (ARIA)	28
US Top Country Albums (Billboard)	39
Chart (2022)	Position
Australian County Albums (ARIA)	16
US Top Country Albums (Billboard)	36
Chart (2023)	Position
Australian County Albums (ARIA)	38
Canadian Albums (Billboard)	66
US Top Country Albums (Billboard)	55
Chart (2024)	Position
Australian Country (ARIA)	79
US Top Country Albums (Billboard)	71

==== All-time charts ====
All-time chart performance for Greatest Hits
Chart	Position
Canadian Artists Albums (SoundScan)	13
United Kingdom (2000–2019 Female Albums)	76

== Certifications ==
Region	Certification	Certified units/sales
Australia (ARIA)	3× Platinum	210,000^{^}
Austria (IFPI Austria)	Gold	15,000^{*}
Belgium (BRMA)	Gold	25,000^{*}
Brazil (Pro-Música Brasil)	Gold	50,000^{*}
Canada (Music Canada)	Diamond	1,000,000^{‡}
Denmark (IFPI Danmark)	Gold	20,000^{^}
Germany (BVMI)	Platinum	200,000^{‡}
Ireland (IRMA)	3× Platinum	45,000^{^}
New Zealand (RMNZ)	2× Platinum	30,000^{^}
Portugal (AFP)	Silver	10,000^{^}
South Africa (RISA)	Platinum	50,000^{*}
Switzerland (IFPI Switzerland)	Platinum	40,000^{^}
United Kingdom (BPI)	3× Platinum	900,000^{‡}
United States (RIAA)	4× Platinum	4,446,200
Summaries
Europe (IFPI)	Platinum	1,000,000^{*}
^{*} Sales figures based on certification alone.^{^} Shipments figures based on certification alone.^{‡} Sales+streaming figures based on certification alone.
