= Why Not? with Shania Twain =

American TV series

- Genre: Documentary
- Starring: Shania Twain
- Country of origin: United States
- Original language: English
- No. of seasons: 1
- No. of episodes: 6

Production
- Executive producers: Gay Rosenthal; Bryn Freedman; Shania Twain
- Running time: 42 minutes
- Production company: Gay Rosenthal Productions

Original release
- Network: Oprah Winfrey Network
- Release: May 8 – June 12, 2011

Why Not? with Shania Twain is an American docuseries series starring Canadian country music singer/songwriter Shania Twain. It premiered on the Oprah Winfrey Network on May 8, 2011. The series is a look at Twain's career, including her upbringing, as well as the musical hiatus she underwent during the first decade of the 21st century.

== Content ==
The show covers details in the life and career of Shania Twain, a Canadian country music singer. Elements in the show's arc include her divorce from longtime husband and producer Robert John "Mutt" Lange, as well as the vocal cord issues which temporarily ended her ability to sing.

== Critical reception ==
David Knowles of The Hollywood Reporter gave the show a mixed review, stating that it was "a sometimes compelling, sometimes turgid program that feels equal parts emotional rescue and public relations coup."

== Episodes ==
No.	Title	Original release date	U.S. viewers (millions)
1	"From This Moment On"	May 8, 2011	0.84
Shania sets out to regain her voice - and put her life back together as well - following a painful divorce.
2	"Battling Betrayal"	May 15, 2011	N/A
Shania visits the Canadian cities where her career took off. She also focuses on her struggles with fame, romance with her ex-husband, producer Robert Lange, and a betrayal that followed.
3	"What Happens in Vegas"	May 22, 2011	N/A
In Las Vegas, Shania is offered a gig at Caesars Palace. She also seeks advice from her old friend Gladys Knight on how to regain her voice and confidence.
4	"Fear Is Just a Four Letter Word"	May 29, 2011	N/A
Shania seeks to regain her voice at a Taos, New Mexico retreat that specializes in coping with grief and loss. While there, her therapy includes a challenging rock climb.
5	"Finding My Voice"	June 5, 2011	N/A
Shania goes to New York City for a photo shoot; meets with music producer David Foster about her single "Today Is Your Day", and must summon up the courage to sing for him; and relaxes with friends Bo Derek and John Corbett in Santa Barbara, California.
6	"Endless Love"	June 12, 2011	0.51
Shania concludes her tour, weds Frédéric Thiébaud in Puerto Rico and records "Endless Love" as a duet with Lionel Richie.
