= Shoes (Shania Twain song) =

- UK promo CD cover

Single by Shania Twain

from the album Music from and Inspired by Desperate Housewives
- Released: September 5, 2005
- Recorded: 2005
- Genre: Country pop
- Length: 3:55
- Label: Hollywood; Lyric Street
- Songwriter(s): Robert John "Mutt" Lange; Shania Twain; Tammy Hyler; Joie Scott; Kim Tribble
- Producer(s): Robert John "Mutt" Lange

Shania Twain singles chronology
"I Ain't No Quitter" (2005)	"Shoes" (2005)	"Today Is Your Day" (2011)

Audio video
- "Shoes" on YouTube

"Shoes" is a song recorded by Canadian country pop singer Shania Twain. It was released as the lead single from the TV soundtrack Music from and Inspired by Desperate Housewives. The song was released on September 5, 2005, to country radio. The song was co-written by Twain and Robert John "Mutt" Lange, along with Tammy Hyler, Joie Scott, and Kim Tribble, marking one of only three songs (the others being "Leaving Is The Only Way Out" and "You Win My Love") by Twain and Mutt Lange to not be solely written by the two. It is the last studio recording issued by Twain prior to the dissolution of her marriage to Lange, and the penultimate Twain recording to feature any involvement from Lange. The song was written and recorded for use on the ABC television program Desperate Housewives.

"Shoes" received mixed to negative reviews by critics but was noted to be a standout on the Desperate Housewives soundtrack. The song did moderately well on the Hot Country Songs chart, reaching as high as number 29. Twain has never performed the song live and after this song, she would not release another single until 2011's "Today Is Your Day".

== Song information ==
"Shoes" was first sent to country radio on September 5, 2005 by Hollywood and Lyric Street Records, marking Twain's first single not released under her then-label, Mercury Records. It was the debut song from the TV soundtrack Music from and Inspired by Desperate Housewives (2005), which was a soundtrack inspired by the ABC television series Desperate Housewives and featured women from multiple genres of music. Remixed by Mutt Lange, a pop version was released to airplay in Australia and Europe and had a planned released to American AC and modern AC stations, although this never happened. A few stations in Canada played the remix of "Shoes" produced by Joe Bermudez.

== Critical reception ==
Billboard magazine's Chuck Taylor rejected "Shoes" writing "Twain certainly remains a major talent with plenty left to say, but these 'Shoes' have no soul." AllMusic called the song "sublimely silly".

== Chart performance ==
"Shoes" debuted on the Billboard Hot Country Songs chart the week of September 10, 2005, at number 57. The single spent 13 weeks on the chart and climbed to a peak position of number 29 on November 5, 2005.

== Official versions ==
- Album version/Country version (3:53)
- Pop mix (3:55)
- Bermudez & Harris 6" Stiletto Mix (3:12)

== Charts ==
Chart (2005)	Peak position
US Hot Country Songs (Billboard)	29

== Release history ==
Release dates and formats for "Shoes"
Region	Date	Format	Label	Ref.
United States	September 5, 2005	Country radio	Lyric Street	
