= I Ain't No Quitter =

- European commercial single cover

Single by Shania Twain

from the album Greatest Hits
- B-side: "Whose Bed Have Your Boots Been Under?"; "I Ain't Goin' Down"
- Released: May 2, 2005
- Recorded: 2004
- Genre: Country
- Length: 3:30
- Label: Mercury Nashville
- Songwriters: Robert John "Mutt" Lange; Shania Twain
- Producer: Robert John "Mutt" Lange

Shania Twain singles chronology
"Don't!" (2005)	"I Ain't No Quitter" (2005)	"Shoes" (2005)

Music video
- "I Ain't No Quitter" on YouTube

"I Ain't No Quitter" is a song by Canadian country-pop singer Shania Twain. It was released on May 2, 2005 to country radio and physically in Europe on July 12, 2005 as the third and final single from her first compilation album Greatest Hits (2004). Like mostly all of her discography at the time, the song was written by Twain and then-husband Robert John "Mutt" Lange, who also produced the track. "I Ain't No Quitter" lyrically is about Twain sticking around with an overconfident and brash man. The song is regarded as a fan favorite among Twain's discography.

The song reached number 45 on the Hot Country Songs. She performed it during her Rock This Country Tour (2015), as well as her Vegas residencies Still the One (2012) and Come On Over (2024).

== Critical reception ==
Chuck Taylor of Billboard magazine appreciated the single and said it was "catchy as all get out, while winking in the face of a classic country theme. It's an appreciable effort that should sparkle on the summer airwaves."

== Chart performance ==
"I Ain't No Quitter" entered the Billboard Hot Country Singles & Tracks chart in the week of May 21, 2005, at number 55. The single spent eight weeks on the chart and climbed to a peak position of number 45 on July 2, 2005, where it remained for one week. "I Ain't No Quitter" was Twain's lowest peaking single since "God Bless the Child", which peaked at number 48 in 1997.

Despite no physical release in Canada, the song still managed to chart on the Canadian Singles Chart purely on import sales. "I Ain't No Quitter" reached number 22.

== Track listings ==
These are the formats for major releases.

UK CD Single

1. "I Ain't No Quitter" - 3:30
2. "Whose Bed Have Your Boots Been Under?" (Live) - 4:27
3. "I Ain't Going Down" (Live) - 4:01
4. Enhanced: "I Ain't No Quitter" - Music Video

Germany CD Single

1. "I Ain't No Quitter" - 3:30
2. "Whose Bed Have Your Boots Been Under?" (Live) - 4:27

== Charts ==
Chart (2005)	Peak position
Canada Country Top 30 (Radio & Records)	8
Canada (Canadian Singles Chart)	22
US Hot Country Songs (Billboard)	45

== Release history ==
Release dates and formats for "I Ain't No Quitter"
Region	Date	Format	Label	Ref.
United States	May 2, 2005	Country radio	Mercury	
Russia	May 24, 2005	Contemporary hit radio	Universal	
