= Up! Live in Chicago =

Video by Shania Twain
- Released: November 18, 2003
- Recorded: July 27, 2003
- Venues: Hutchinson Field, Grant Park (Chicago, Illinois)
- Genre: Live
- Length: 105:44
- Label: Mercury Nashville
- Director: Beth McCarthy-Miller
- Producer: Beth McCarthy-Miller

Shania Twain chronology
A Collection of Video Hits (2002)	Up! Live in Chicago (2003)	Up! Close and Personal (2004)

Up! Live in Chicago is the third live video album by Canadian singer Shania Twain. Directed and produced by Beth McCarthy-Miller, the concert was held and filmed on July 27, 2003 at Hutchinson Field in the south-side of Grant Park in Chicago, Illinois; over 50,000 people attended. The concert itself differed from that of the Up! Tour (2003–04), featuring a different stage, setlist and production. Behind-the-scenes footage of the singer visiting local landmarks and events was filmed the same week. The concert film premiered on the National Broadcasting Company (NBC) on August 19, 2003. The special was watched by over 8.87 million viewers, becoming the second-most-viewed concert film on television, behind Celine Dion's A New Day ... Live in Las Vegas (2003).

Due to its high television ratings, Up! Live in Chicago was released as a video album on November 18, 2003 by Mercury Records Nashville. Released both in standard DVD packaging and in a jewel case, it featured additional performances not included on the television presentation. The album was also received positively by music critics, who complimented Shania's interaction with the audience; however, some questioned her live singing. The video peaked at number two on Billboard's Top Music Video sales chart, and was certified platinum by the RIAA for shipments of over 100,000 copies in the United States. It was also certified platinum in Australia and gold in Austria and Brazil. Excerpts from Up! Live in Chicago were used as the music videos for "She's Not Just a Pretty Face" (2003) and "It Only Hurts When I'm Breathing" (2004).

== Background ==
Over three and a half years after her last live show, Shania performed a series of three outdoor concerts in Europe and North America in July 2003 to promote her fourth studio album Up! (2002). The singer scheduled the trek primarily because of her prolonged absence from live performances and to ensure playing a concert in the United States prior to her Up! Tour. At the time, it was to commence in September 2003 in Europe, although it ultimately did so in North America. She said, "With the tour starting in September, I didn't want to miss the summer without staging a concert in the U.S. After living with these 19 songs [from Up!] and going through the recording process, it's time to get on stage and perform them." She conceptualized the shows to consist mainly of uptempo numbers and to be almost void of ballads to "spend the night rocking" and maintain an energized spirit. She also deliberately left much room for improvisation, stating that she preferred for the performances to be very spontaneous, than choreographed and music video-like. She first performed on July 5, 2003 at Nowlan Park in Kilkenny, Ireland, and then on July 12, 2003 at Hyde Park in London, England with a setlist composed of twenty-two songs.

The singer then headed to Chicago, Illinois to perform a free outdoor concert on July 27, 2003, held at the Hutchinson Field in the south-side of Grant Park. Meanwhile, the National Broadcasting Company (NBC) was seeking an artist to host a prime time television music special, and contacted Twain to discuss the possibilities of filming the concert in Chicago. NBC executives sought Twain for the special because they believed her lengthy career and crossover history would translate into more viewers. She accepted the offer, and the show was directed and produced by Beth McCarthy-Miller. Prior to performing at Grant Park, Twain spent a week in Chicago to film behind-the-scenes footage that would be used for the television special. She visited landmarks and attended local events, such as a Chicago Cubs game where she tossed the first pitch and sang "Take Me Out to the Ballgame" for the audience. The singer also took a riverboat trip and visited outposts of her favorite charity Kids Cafés, a program specialized to feed children in America. The concert was produced by JAM Creative Productions, and sponsored by local radio station WUSN and the Chicago Tribune, which disseminated information about obtaining concert tickets. The show was attended by over 50,000 people. The Behind the Scenes featurette was not featured on the DVD.

== Concert synopsis ==
It's not a touring show. It's more the idea of a one-off. There isn't a dramatic theme or anything like that. It's pretty much a straight-ahead rock summer concert in the park. That's the feeling I want to give off. It's not the same sort of production direction you might take on a stadium tour. It's a much freer feeling than that, which is great. I've been off tour for three-and-a-half years. We haven't been onstage for so long, and for me, there's something fresh and exciting about it.

—Shania speaking of the concert's difference from the Up! Tour (2003–04).

The concert's setlist consisted primarily of songs from Up!, with several hits from The Woman in Me (1995) and Come on Over (1997). The songs from Up! were not performed in a specific format from the three studio versions of the album. Shania desired to approach the live productions as their "own beast". The show commenced with Shania, who was costumed by a "Body Glove" top and black cargo pants, arriving from the back of the stage to perform "Man! I Feel Like a Woman!" alongside her band. The singer then followed with "Up!" and after talking with the audience, the singer says it has been 3 and 1/2 years since she was up on the concert stage and then performed "Honey, I'm Home". Shania continued to perform a total of ten songs during the segment. At one point, she invited an audience member, James Hundt, onstage to propose to his girlfriend, Annelisa Hahn. She accepted and the two slow danced onstage as Shania sang "When You Kiss Me", sitting on a stool placed towards the end of the runway. The segment ended with a performance of the UK Dance Mix of "That Don't Impress Me Much", and "I'm Gonna Getcha Good!", where Shania invited three little girls Shyanne, Meanny and Ashley to join her onstage. In the succeeding segment, Shania donned a tan, multi-patterned halter top with the words "True Love" spelled on the front and black, sequined wide leg trousers. She began with "From This Moment On". Then, she performed "No One Needs to Know" with an acoustic guitar and "Thank You Baby! (For Makin' Someday Come So Soon)" with a small orchestra accompanying her. She concluded the nine-song segment with "In My Car (I'll Be the Driver)" and "(If You're Not in It for Love) I'm Outta Here!". The singer returned to the stage for the third and final segment, wearing a black, long-sleeve top with an American flag imprinted in the center and denim capri pants. She performed a rendition of "You're Still the One" while playing the acoustic guitar again, and ended the show with "Nah!" and "Rock This Country!".

== Release ==
On June 6, 2003, the Chicago Tribune announced the Grant Park concert, which was to be filmed for an August NBC special. Immediately after the show concluded, its premiere date of August 19, 2003 was specified. A two-hour edited version was televised on August 19 at 8:00 P.M. EST to high ratings. Up! Live in Chicago was watched by over 8.87 million viewers in the United States, becoming the second-most-watched concert film in television history, behind Celine Dion's CBS special A New Day ... Live in Las Vegas earlier that year. Following the concert film's television success, Mercury Records Nashville released the home video album on November 18, 2003 in Region 1 and on November 24, 2003 in Region 2. It was released in DVD format, both in conventional DVD packaging and in a jewel case; both appeared in an aspect ratio of 1.33:1 (4:3). The release featured six additional performances that were not shown on the NBC special and also stereo and 5.1 surround sound mixes. Up! Live in Chicago also sourced video material for two of Up!'s singles. The performances of "She's Not Just a Pretty Face" (2003) and "It Only Hurts When I'm Breathing" (2004) served as the songs' music videos, while the audio rendition of "It Only Hurts When I'm Breathing" was released as a live CD single and a digital download on March 9, 2004.

== Reception ==
=== Critical reception ===
Up! Live in Chicago received favorable reviews from critics. Matt Bjorke of About.com reviewed the home release of Up! Live in Chicago. He had not attended a Shania concert, nor seen the television special, and was surprised by the singer's stage presence. He believed that the video would make the singer's naysayers realize Shania's vocal talents and ability to entertainment and interact with a crowd. Bjorke concluded, "Up! Live in Chicago is a dynamic DVD experience that is sure to please fans for years to come." Chris Jones of BBC noted the band's differed from most country bands and wanted a more country-influenced sound. However, Jones complimented the singer's incorporation of the audience, naming it her "inimitable style". He added that the video was "far from [a] sterile experience" because of the live setting and crowd ambiance. However, he suspected Shania's "photocopy-perfect" vocal delivery could be attributed to a fair amount of post-production work. "Overall, you know exactly what you're getting with Shania, and for her fans this is bound to be a very good thing indeed." Bobby Reed of the Chicago Sun Times believed Shania failed to give insight into her identity or personality, noting she never mentioned her relocation to Switzerland or her then-new son, Eja. He complimented the band's strong, yet rote efforts of bringing the dense production to life. However, he claimed Shania's vocal delivery was at times frail. Reed also noted the absence of guest stars, in contrast to her two previous concert specials, and acknowledged that inviting fans onstage gave the concert a country-fair vibe. Mark Guarino of Arlington Heights' Daily Herald believed the concert was evidently tailored for television and that Shania played the proper host. He continued, "As the night wore on, Shania tried different ways, with varying degrees of success, to make the magnitude of such a large event work for the small screen. Her reliance on audience participation was an attempt to humanize things, but it often backfired."

=== Commercial performance ===
On the week ending December 13, 2003, Up! Live in Chicago debuted at number three on Billboard's Top Music Video sales chart. Two weeks later, it reached its peak at number two. The video spent fourteen weeks on the chart before returning for a fifteenth and final week at number eighteen on the week ending March 12, 2005. In March 2004, Up! Live in Chicago was certified platinum by the Recording Industry Association of America (RIAA) for shipments of 100,000 copies in the United States. On the week ending January 15, 2005, Up! Live in Chicago peaked at number eight on New Zealand's Top 10 Music DVDs. The video peaked at number sixty-one on the German Albums Chart, and spent a total of eleven weeks on the chart. It was also certified platinum by the Australian Recording Industry Association (ARIA) for the shipment of 15,000 copies in the country. In Brazil, the video was certified gold by the Associação Brasileira dos Produtores de Discos (ABPD) for the sale of 15,000 copies. In Austria, the video was certified gold by the International Federation of the Phonographic Industry (IFPI) for the sale of 5,000 copies.

== Setlist ==
All tracks are written by Shania Twain and Robert John "Mutt" Lange.

No.	Title	Length
1.	"Man! I Feel Like a Woman!"	4:15
2.	"Up!"	3:33
3.	"Honey, I'm Home"	4:14
4.	"She's Not Just a Pretty Face"	4:16
5.	"Forever and for Always"	4:22
6.	"Ka-Ching!"	3:41
7.	"When You Kiss Me"	7:18
8.	"Don't Be Stupid (You Know I Love You)"	3:49
9.	"That Don't Impress Me Much"	4:53
10.	"I'm Gonna Getcha Good!"	7:36
11.	"From This Moment On"	6:08
12.	"No One Needs to Know"	3:15
13.	"Thank You Baby! (For Makin' Someday Come So Soon)"	4:10
14.	"It Only Hurts When I'm Breathing"	3:47
15.	"Juanita"	4:20
16.	"Whose Bed Have Your Boots Been Under?"	4:40
17.	"Any Man of Mine"	4:14
18.	"In My Car (I'll Be the Driver)"	4:41
19.	"(If You're Not in It for Love) I'm Outta Here!"	5:52
20.	"You're Still the One"	3:29
21.	"Nah!"	5:00
22.	"Rock This Country!"	6:25

== Charts and certifications ==
=== Charts ===
Chart (2003–2005)	Peak position
German Albums Chart	61
New Zealand Top 10 Music DVDs	8
US Billboard Top Music Videos	2

=== Certifications ===
Certifications for "Up! Live in Chicago"
Region	Certification	Certified units/sales
Australia (ARIA)	Platinum	15,000^{^}
Austria (IFPI Austria)	Gold	5,000^{*}
Brazil (Pro-Música Brasil)	Gold	25,000^{*}
New Zealand (RMNZ)	Platinum	5,000^{^}
United Kingdom (BPI)	Gold	25,000^{^}
United States (RIAA)	Platinum	100,000^{^}
^{*} Sales figures based on certification alone.^{^} Shipments figures based on certification alone.

== Credits and personnel ==
- Brent Barcus – guitar, background vocals
- J. D. Blair – drums
- Roddy Chong – guitar, percussion, mandolin, violin, background vocals
- Cory Churko – background vocals, guitar, mandolin, violin, background vocals
- Andy Cichon – bass guitar, background vocals
- Allison Cornell – keyboards, mandolin, violin, drums, background vocals
- Brad Duns – script coordinator
- David Foster – film editing
- Hardy Hemphill – keyboards, percussion, harmonica, background vocals
- Booey Kober – film editing
- Beth McCarthy-Miller – director, producer
- Steve McMillan – live sound mixing
- Jeff Muhlstock – steadicam operator
- Marc Muller – guitar
- Shania Twain – guitar, performer, singer
- Randall Waller – guitar, background vocals
