= Up! Close and Personal =

Video by Shania Twain
- Released: November 8, 2004
- Recorded: November 2003
- Length: 61:02
- Label: Mercury Nashville
- Director: Beth McCarthy-Miller
- Producer: Dan Braun, Cliff Burnstein, Carol Donovan, Beth McCarthy Miller, Peter Mensch, Marc Reiter

Shania Twain chronology
Up! Live in Chicago (2003)	Up! Close and Personal (2004)

Up! Close and Personal is the fourth live video album by Canadian singer Shania Twain. It was directed by Beth McCarthy-Miller, and produced by team composed of Dan Braun, Cliff Burnstein, Carol Donovan, McCarthy-Miller, Peter Mensch, and Marc Reiter. The concert was filmed in November 2003 at a sound stage in Nashville, Tennessee, with an audience of 300 people. When conceptualizing the show, Twain desired to make the setting intimate and perform the songs acoustically, so she turned to bluegrass band Alison Krauss and Union Station to perform backup during the concert. It was also modeled after Elvis Presley's '68 Comeback Special, with a similar stage and Twain being costumed by a black, leather jumpsuit. Up! Close and Personal premiered on the National Broadcasting Company (NBC) on November 25, 2003, and was high in ratings, being watched by over 9 million viewers in the United States.

Nearly a year later, Up! Close and Personal was released by Mercury Nashville Records, in DVD format, as a video album on November 8, 2004 to coincide with the release Twain's Greatest Hits album. The video also served as a source to audio tracks used as B-sides for the singles from Greatest Hits. Up! Close and Personal received mixed reviews from music critics (some who believed she was overshadowed by Krauss' talents, others who complimented her vocal talents) and positive commercial outcomes. It peaked at number eight on Billboard's Top Music Video sales chart, and was certified platinum by the Recording Industry Association of America (RIAA) for shipment of 100,000 copies in the United States.

== Background ==
On August 19, 2003, Twain's concert film Up! Live in Chicago premiered on the National Broadcasting Company (NBC) and drew in over 8.87 million viewers, therefore becoming the second-most-viewed concert film on television, behind Celine Dion's A New Day... Live in Las Vegas (2003). Following its success on television, NBC was interested again in collaborating with Twain for a second prime time special. Twain accepted the offer, but desired to deviate from high-elaboration, and perform a show much more stripped and intimate than the one filmed for Up! Live in Chicago or those included in her Up! Tour (2003–04). She explained, "I wanted to go back to something stripped-down and rootsy. I've been doing big concerts for quite a long time, and I love it, but I just want that contrast." Ergo, she turned to singer and fiddler Alison Krauss, head of the bluegrass band Alison Krauss and Union Station, whom she had collaborated with on numerous instances; Krauss and her band backed Twain in her performance of "Forever and for Always" at the 2003 CMT Music Awards, and recorded a duet with Twain for a tribute album to Dolly Parton. Twain described her decision to be completely influenced by her desire to "break the music down", and that Alison Krauss and Union Station were her only choice for the television special.

Krauss was apprehensive at first, noting drastic differences between her personal acoustic style and that of Twain. She stated, "It's so different from what we do, we didn't know what liberties we were supposed to take. Were we supposed to learn it off the record? Were we supposed to learn the themes?" She found aid in Twain's then-husband and producer Robert John "Mutt" Lange, who told Krauss to perform the songs as if they were her own. While preparing for the show, Krauss said she found the songs very simple to learn because of their catchy melodies that could function in any musical style. While traveling on the Up! Tour, Twain decided to cover of AC/DC's "You Shook Me All Night Long" (1980) for the television special. However, she edited the song's lyrics to void them of the crudeness she was not fond of singing along to as a teenager. Krauss later expressed her opposing views, saying she would have personally kept the original lyrics. The show was modeled after Elvis Presley's '68 Comeback Special, with a similar stage and Twain being costumed by a black, leather jumpsuit. The concert was filmed in November 2003 at a sound stage in Nashville, Tennessee to a crowd of 300 attendants. Up! Close and Personal was directed by Beth McCarthy-Miller, who also directed Up! Live in Chicago, and was produced by a team that consisted of Dan Braun, Cliff Burnstein, Carol Donovan, McCarthy-Miller, Peter Mensch, and Marc Reiter.

== Release ==
The hour-long Up! Close and Personal premiered on NBC on November 25, 2003 at 9:00 P.M. EST, as part of the network's line up for Thanksgiving week. The telecast garnered over 9 million viewers in the United States, surpassing the ratings of Up! Live in Chicago. Nearly a year later, Up! Close and Personal was released by Mercury Nashville Records as a DVD on November 8, 2004 in Region 2 and on November 9, 2004 in Region 1, to coincide with the release of Twain's Greatest Hits album in the corresponding territories. The video appeared in an aspect ratio of 1.33:1 (4:3) and contained both 2.0 stereo and 5.1 surround sound mixes. Audio versions of the performances were used for single releases. The live rendition of "You're Still the One" was released as a digital download exclusively to the iTunes Store on November 9, 2004. It, along with the audio for the performance of "I'm Holdin' On to Love (To Save My Life)", was also included in the maxi single of "Party for Two" (2004). Audios for the performances of "I'm Gonna Getcha Good!" and "From This Moment On" were included on the maxi single for "Don't!" (2005). And the audios of the performances of "Whose Bed Have Your Boots Been Under?" and "I Ain't Goin' Down" appeared on the maxi CD single for "I Ain't No Quitter" (2005).

== Reception ==
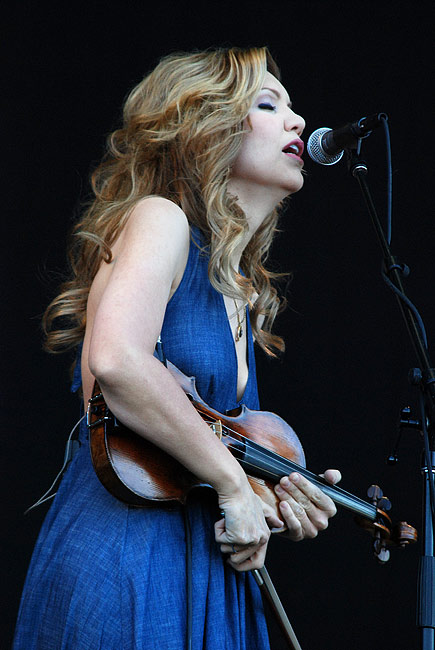
Alison Krauss (pictured) collaborated with Twain for the special.

=== Critical reception ===
Up! Close and Personal received mixed reviews from music critics. David Bianculli of New York City's Daily News wrote, "After watching Britney Spears' [Live from Las Vegas (2002)] special last week, Twain's act will seem like an exercise in restraint. It'll also seem like someone singing, rather than lip-syncing." Roger Catlin of the Hartford Courant gave Up! Close & Personal a negative review. He found himself straining to hear Alison Krauss and Union Station, and asked, "And when was the last time you tuned in to a star's special to hear the background singers?" Furthermore, he would have preferred the band to duet with Twain, rather than perform backup for her. Catlin also criticized Twain's decision to model the show after Presley's '68 Comeback Special, believing she did so with far less efficiency. "Not only is she not Elvis, she's not even Alison", he concluded. Allmusic rated Up! Close and Personal three out of five stars.

=== Chart performance ===
On the week ending November 27, 2004, the video debuted at number eight on Billboard's Top Music Video sales chart. In December 2004, Up! Close & Personal was certified platinum by the Recording Industry Association of America (RIAA) for shipment of 100,000 copies in the United States. On the week ending March 21, 2005, the video entered at number ninety-eight on the German Albums Chart, its only week on the chart.

== Setlist ==
All tracks written by Shania Twain and Robert John "Mutt" Lange, except "You Shook Me All Night Long" by Angus Young, Malcolm Young and Brian Johnson.

No.	Title	Length
1.	"I'm Gonna Getcha Good!"	4:58
2.	"Ain't No Particular Way"	4:38
3.	"From This Moment On"	5:26
4.	"Whose Bed Have Your Boots Been Under?"	4:33
5.	"I Ain't Goin' Down"	4:50
6.	"Up!"	5:10
7.	"You're Still the One"	5:05
8.	"I'm Holdin' On to Love (To Save My Life)"	5:20
9.	"She's Not Just a Pretty Face"	5:21
10.	"Forever and for Always"	4:07
11.	"In My Car (I'll Be the Driver)"	4:53
12.	"You Shook Me All Night Long"	3:31

== Charts and certifications ==
=== Charts ===
Chart (2004–2005)	Peak position
German Albums Chart	98
US Billboard Top Music Videos	8

=== Certifications ===
Country	Certifications
United States	Platinum

== Credits and personnel ==
- Larry Atamanuik – drums
- Barry Bales – bass
- Ron Block – guitar
- Dan Braun – producer
- Cliff Burnstein – producer
- Carol Donovan – producer
- Jerry Douglas – dobro
- Hardy Hemphill – background vocals, percussion
- Alison Krauss – background vocals, fiddle
- Beth McCarthy Miller – director, producer
- Peter Mensch – producer
- Marc Reiter – producer
- Shania Twain – performer, singer
- Dan Tyminski – backing vocals, guitar, mandolin
