= Paul Boyd (director) =

Scottish music video, commercial and feature film director

- Born: Glasgow, Scotland
- Education: St. Martin's School of Art
- Occupation: Director
- Spouse: Angelyna Martinez
- Children: Luna Blaise

Paul Boyd is a Scottish music video, commercial and feature film director.

== Biography ==
Born in Glasgow, Scotland, Boyd graduated from St. Martin's School of Art in London with a BA in Fine Art Film. He currently works and resides in Los Angeles.

Boyd directed and authored Vicious Circle, a feature film starring Paul Rodriguez Jr, Emily Rios, and Trevor Wright, which received the Best Picture Award at the 2008 NYILFF HBO. He has directed advertising campaigns for L'Oreal, Revlon, Jaguar and Dodge.

== Videography (highlights) ==
Year	Title	Artist
2021	"Dominoes"	Ellise
2012	"Endless Love"	Lionel Richie and Shania Twain
2012	"Infinite Love"	A. R. Rahman
2012	"Professional Griefers"	deadmau5
2011	"Miracle Worker"	SuperHeavy
2011	"Lowlife"	Theory of a Deadman
2011	"Stereo Love"	Sarvi
2011	"The 5th"	David Garrett
2010	"Weight of Love"	Gliss
2010	"Change"	U.G.O Crew
2010	"It's a Trip"	Shakespears Sister
2010	"10 Minutes"	Inna
2010	"Last Stand"	Adelitas Way
2010	"I Need You Now"	Agnes
2009	"By the Way"	Theory of a Deadman
2009	"Let's Go"	Cartel
2009	"Tonight"	Samantha Shelton
2009	"Smooth Operator"	Sheri Nowrozi
2008	"Beautiful"	10 Years
2007	"Taking Chances"	Celine Dion
2007	"Before It's Too Late"	Goo Goo Dolls
2007	"Settlin'"	Sugarland
2006	"My, Oh My"	The Wreckers
2006	"Finding My Way Back Home"	Lee Ann Womack
2006	"Ni una Sola Palabra"	Paulina Rubio
2006	"Unbroken Ground"	Gary Nichols
2006	"Life Ain't Always Beautiful"	Gary Allan
2005	"Twenty Years and Two Husbands Ago"	Lee Ann Womack
2005	"Just Might (Make Me Believe)"	Sugarland
2005	"Best I Ever Had"	Gary Allan
2005	"Something More"	Sugarland
2004	"Thank You Baby!"	Shania Twain
2004	"When You Kiss Me"	Shania Twain
2003	"Forever and for Always"	Shania Twain
2002	"I'm Gonna Getcha Good!"	Shania Twain
2001	"Gone Away"	Cold
2001	"Drowning" - Wet Version	Backstreet Boys
2000	"A Whiter Shade of Pale"	Sarah Brightman
2000	"Desert Rose"	Sting
1999	"The Best of Me"	Bryan Adams
1999	"When the Heartache Is Over"	Tina Turner
1999	"You've Got a Way"	Shania Twain
1999	"Man! I Feel Like a Woman!"	Shania Twain
1999	"That Don't Impress Me Much"	Shania Twain
1998	"From This Moment On"	Shania Twain
1997	"Everything"	INXS
1997	"Stop By"	Rashaan Patterson
1997	"Half the Man"	Jamiroquai
1996	"Proceed"	The Roots
1995	"I Believe"	Jai
1995	"The Witch"	The Cult
1995	"Charm"	Wild Colonials
1994	"I Knew That"	The Devlins
1994	"You Gotta Be"	Des'ree
1994	"I Wonder"	Blind Melon
1994	"Confide in Me"	Kylie Minogue
1993	"Where I'm From"	Digable Planets
1992	"Prayer for the Dying"	Seal
1992	"Dear Old Dad"	Blind Melon
1992	"Come over Here"	J. (Jaye Muller)
1991	"Heart of Soul"	The Cult
1991	"Baby Don't Cry"	INXS
1991	"Make Out Alright"	The Divinyls
1991	"Stand by My Woman"	Lenny Kravitz
1990	"Word of Mouth"	Mike + The Mechanics
1989	"Welcome"	Gino Latino
