= She's Not Just a Pretty Face =

2003 single by Shania Twain

- US promo CD cover

Single by Shania Twain

from the album Up!
- B-side: "I'm Gonna Getcha Good!"; "Thank You Baby! (For Makin' Someday Come So Soon)"; "Forever and for Always"
- Released: October 6, 2003
- Studio: Compass Point (Nassau, Bahamas); Officine Meccaniche (Milan, Italy); Windmill Lane (Dublin, Ireland)
- Genre: Country pop; power pop
- Length: 3:49 (red and green versions); 3:39 (blue version)
- Label: Mercury Nashville
- Songwriters: Robert John "Mutt" Lange; Shania Twain
- Producer: Robert John "Mutt" Lange

Shania Twain singles chronology
| "Thank You Baby! (For Makin' Someday Come So Soon)" (2003) | "She's Not Just a Pretty Face" (2003) | "When You Kiss Me" (2003) |

North American singles chronology
| "Forever and for Always" (2003) | "She's Not Just a Pretty Face" (2003) | "It Only Hurts When I'm Breathing" (2004) |

Live video
- "She's Not Just A Pretty Face" on YouTube

"She's Not Just a Pretty Face" is a song co-written and recorded by Canadian country pop artist Shania Twain, recorded for her fourth studio album Up! (2002). It was released as the album's sixth single on October 6, 2003; the fourth released to country radio. Twain wrote the song with then-husband Robert John "Mutt" Lange, who also produced it.

"She's Not Just a Pretty Face" peaked at number nine on the US Billboard Hot Country Singles & Tracks chart. It was nominated for Best Female Country Vocal Performance at the 2005 Grammy Awards. The song was performed on The Oprah Winfrey Show, the 2003 CMA Awards, and the 2003 Billboard Music Awards. Twain also performed "She's Not Just a Pretty Face" on her Up! Tour and again in 2023 as part of a throwback medley on her Queen of Me Tour.

== Composition ==
The song is performed in the key of E major in common time with a tempo of 100 beats per minute. Twain's vocals span from B_{3} to C♯_{5} in the song.

== Critical reception ==
The song received mixed reviews upon release. Billboard magazine called the song an "ultra-lightweight country-girl power anthem" as well as "exquisite country pop".

== Chart performance ==
"She's Not Just a Pretty Face" debuted on the US Billboard Hot Country Songs chart on October 11, 2003, at number 55. It reached its peak position of number 9 the week of January 10, 2004, and stayed 20 weeks on the chart.

== Music video ==
The music video for "She's Not Just a Pretty Face" was taken directly from Twain's 2003 NBC special Up! Live in Chicago, filmed on July 27, 2003, and directed by Beth McCarthy-Miller. It debuted to CMT on November 9, 2003, to promote the concert DVD. The video is available on the European enhanced CD single, and the performance can be seen on the Up! Live in Chicago DVD.

== Track listings ==
Europe CD Maxi

1. "She's Not Just a Pretty Face" (Red) – 3:49
2. "Thank You Baby!" (Live in Chicago) – 4:01
3. "When You Kiss Me" (Live in Chicago) – 4:08
4. Enhanced: "She's Not Just a Pretty Face" (Live in Chicago) – Music Video

Europe CD Single

1. "She's Not Just a Pretty Face" (Red) – 3:49
2. "Forever And For Always" (Live in Chicago) – 4:03

== Charts ==
=== Weekly charts ===
Weekly chart performance for "She's Not Just a Pretty Face"
| Chart (2003–2004) | Peak position |
|---|---|
| CIS Airplay (TopHit) | 92 |
| Romania (Romanian Top 100) | 38 |
| Russia Airplay (TopHit) | 79 |
| Ukraine Airplay (TopHit) | 74 |
| US Billboard Hot 100 | 56 |
| US Hot Country Songs (Billboard) | 9 |

=== Year-end charts ===
2003 year-end chart performance for "She's Not Just a Pretty Face"
| Chart (2003) | Position |
|---|---|
| CIS Airplay (TopHit) | 134 |
| Russia Airplay (TopHit) | 119 |
| Ukraine Airplay (TopHit) | 104 |

2004 year-end chart performance for "She's Not Just a Pretty Face"
| Chart (2004) | Position |
|---|---|
| US Hot Country Singles & Tracks (Billboard) | 58 |

== Release history ==
Release dates and formats for "She's Not Just a Pretty Face"
| Region | Date | Format | Label | Ref. |
|---|---|---|---|---|
| United States | October 6, 2003 | Country radio | Mercury | |
| United Kingdom | April 5, 2004 (cancelled) | CD | Mercury | |
