= Up! Tour =

2003–04 concert tour by Shania Twain

- Tour by Shania Twain
- Promotional poster for the tour
- Associated album: Up!
- Start date: September 25, 2003
- End date: July 10, 2004
- Legs: 3
- No. of shows: 28 in Europe; 85 in North America; 113 in total
- Box office: $87 million (96 shows)

Shania Twain concert chronology
- Come On Over Tour (1998–99); Up! Tour (2003–04); Shania: Still the One (2012–14)

The Up! Tour was the second headlining concert tour by Canadian singer-songwriter Shania Twain in support of her fourth studio album Up! (2002). It began on September 25, 2003, in Hamilton, Ontario and finished on July 10, 2004, in Sunrise, Florida. The show reached North America and Europe. According to Billboard magazine, the tour grossed $87 million from 96 reported shows between 2003 and 2004.

== Set list ==
=== North America ===
2003

1. "Man! I Feel Like a Woman!"
2. "Up!"
3. "Honey, I'm Home"
4. "C'est la vie"
5. "Forever and for Always"
6. "I'm Not in the Mood (To Say No)!" ^{1}
7. "She's Not Just a Pretty Face"
8. "Don't Be Stupid (You Know I Love You)"
9. "When You Kiss Me" ^{1}
10. "Love Gets Me Every Time"
11. "Whose Bed Have Your Boots Been Under?"
12. "From This Moment On" ^{1}
13. "No One Needs to Know" ^{1}
14. "Thank You Baby! (for Makin' Someday Come So Soon)" ^{1}
15. "The Woman in Me (Needs the Man in You)"
16. "That Don't Impress Me Much"
17. "What a Way to Wanna Be!"
18. Medley
  - "When"
  - "You Win My Love"
  - "Come on Over"
  - "I'm Holdin' on to Love (to Save My Life)"
19. "I'm Gonna Getcha Good!"
20. "Nah!" ^{1}
21. "In My Car (I'll Be the Driver)"
22. "(If You're Not in It for Love) I'm Outta Here!"
  Encore
23. "You're Still the One"
24. "Any Man of Mine"
25. "Rock This Country!"

2004

1. "Man! I Feel Like a Woman!"
2. "Up!"
3. "Honey, I'm Home"
4. "Don't Be Stupid (You Know I Love You)"
5. "Whose Bed Have Your Boots Been Under?"
6. "Forever and for Always"
7. "She's Not Just a Pretty Face"
8. "What a Way to Wanna Be!" ^{1}
9. Medley
  - "When"
  - "You Win My Love"
  - "Come on Over"
  - "I'm Holdin' on to Love (to Save My Life)"
10. "The Woman in Me (Needs the Man in You)"
11. "That Don't Impress Me Much"
12. "I'm Gonna Getcha Good!"
13. "Nah!" ^{1}
14. "You're Still the One"
15. "(If You're Not in It for Love) I'm Outta Here!"
  Encore
16. "Any Man of Mine"
17. "Rock This Country!"

^{1} Performed at select dates.

=== Europe ===
1. "Man! I Feel Like a Woman!"
2. "Up!"
3. "Honey, I'm Home"
4. "C'est la vie"
5. "She's Not Just a Pretty Face"
6. "Don't Be Stupid (You Know I Love You)"
7. "When You Kiss Me"
8. "Whose Bed Have Your Boots Been Under?"
9. "Forever and for Always"
10. "Ka-Ching!"
11. "What a Way to Wanna Be!"
12. Medley
  - "When"
  - "You Win My Love"
  - "Come on Over"
  - "I'm Holdin' on to Love (to Save My Life)"
13. "Thank You Baby! (for Makin' Someday Come So Soon)"
14. "The Woman in Me (Needs the Man in You)"
15. "That Don't Impress Me Much"
16. "I'm Gonna Getcha Good!"
17. "In My Car (I'll Be the Driver)"
18. "(If You're Not in It for Love) I'm Outta Here!"
  Encore
19. "You're Still the One"
20. "Any Man of Mine"
21. "Rock This Country!"

== Tour dates ==
Twain performing during the first North American leg in 2003

Date	City	Country	Venue	Opening act(s)	Tickets sold / available	Revenue
North America Leg 1
September 25, 2003	Hamilton	Canada	Copps Coliseum	Emerson Drive	18,573 / 18,573	$1,238,668
September 27, 2003	Ottawa	Canada	Corel Centre	Emerson Drive	—N/a	—N/a
September 29, 2003	Pittsburgh	United States	Mellon Arena	James Otto	12,950 / 13,210	$841,755
September 30, 2003	Buffalo	United States	HSBC Arena	James Otto	15,353 / 19,968	$948,735
October 2, 2003	Toronto	Canada	Air Canada Centre	Emerson Drive	38,000 / 38,000	$2,467,799
October 3, 2003	Toronto	Canada	Air Canada Centre	Emerson Drive	38,000 / 38,000	$2,467,799
October 4, 2003	Grand Rapids	United States	Van Andel Arena	James Otto	12,569 / 12,569	$807,770
October 7, 2003	Boston	United States	FleetCenter	James Otto	17,352 / 17,352	$1,175,490
October 8, 2003	East Rutherford	United States	Continental Airlines Arena	James Otto	17,393 / 19,003	$1,024,590
October 10, 2003	Philadelphia	United States	Wachovia Center	James Otto	19,526 / 19,526	$1,282,240
October 11, 2003	Albany	United States	Pepsi Arena	James Otto	15,554 / 15,554	$1,055,175
October 12, 2003	Uniondale	United States	Nassau Veterans Memorial Coliseum	James Otto	14,682 / 17,751	$830,905
October 14, 2003	New York City	United States	Madison Square Garden	James Otto	15,706 / 19,018	$871,760
October 15, 2003	Uncasville	United States	Mohegan Sun Arena	James Otto	—N/a	—N/a
October 17, 2003	Washington, D.C.	United States	MCI Center	James Otto	16,672 / 16,969	$1,129,301
October 18, 2003	Cleveland	United States	Gund Arena	James Otto	18,120 / 20,641	$1,048,235
October 21, 2003	Indianapolis	United States	Conseco Fieldhouse	James Otto	16,406 / 18,042	$671,750
October 22, 2003	Chicago	United States	United Center	James Otto	14,567 / 16,951	$1,034,380
October 24, 2003	Auburn Hills	United States	The Palace of Auburn Hills	James Otto	40,320 / 40,320	$2,441,740
October 25, 2003	Auburn Hills	United States	The Palace of Auburn Hills	James Otto	40,320 / 40,320	$2,441,740
October 27, 2003	Madison	United States	Kohl Center	James Otto	15,940 / 16,712	$946,922
October 28, 2003	Saint Paul	United States	Xcel Energy Center	James Otto	20,554 / 20,554	$1,200,330
October 29, 2003	Milwaukee	United States	BMO Harris Bradley Center	James Otto	14,839 / 18,397	$776,408
November 21, 2003	Houston	United States	Toyota Center	James Otto	16,335 / 17,198	$640,830
November 22, 2003	San Antonio	United States	SBC Center	James Otto	11,316 / 17,617	$726,244
November 23, 2003	Dallas	United States	American Airlines Center	James Otto	15,988 / 16,816	$807,780
November 25, 2003	Oklahoma City	United States	Ford Center	James Otto	12,068 / 16,000	$729,100
November 28, 2003	St. Louis	United States	Savvis Center	James Otto	18,101 / 21,209	$789,775
November 29, 2003	Kansas City	United States	Kemper Arena	James Otto	16,141 / 18,574	$724,091
December 1, 2003	Denver	United States	Pepsi Center	James Otto	16,928 / 16,928	$996,205
December 2, 2003	Salt Lake City	United States	Delta Center	James Otto	—N/a	—N/a
December 4, 2003	Calgary	Canada	Pengrowth Saddledome	Emerson Drive	16,869 / 16,869	$1,204,909
December 5, 2003	Edmonton	Canada	Rexall Place	Emerson Drive	16,375 / 16,375	$1,139,349
December 7, 2003	Vancouver	Canada	Pacific Coliseum	Emerson Drive	33,396 / 33,396	$2,350,228
December 8, 2003	Vancouver	Canada	Pacific Coliseum	Emerson Drive	33,396 / 33,396	$2,350,228
December 11, 2003	Portland	United States	Rose Garden	James Otto	14,091 / 16,697	$882,455
December 13, 2003	Sacramento	United States	ARCO Arena	James Otto	16,519 / 16,519	$1,172,328
December 14, 2003	San Jose	United States	HP Pavilion	James Otto	16,199 / 16,199	$1,111,660
December 16, 2003	Anaheim	United States	Arrowhead Pond of Anaheim	James Otto	15,279 / 15,279	$948,985
December 17, 2003	San Diego	United States	Cox Arena	James Otto	10,267 / 11,471	$686,840
December 19, 2003	Phoenix	United States	America West Arena	James Otto	15,736 / 15,736	$1,120,175
December 20, 2003	Las Vegas	United States	Mandalay Bay Events Center	James Otto	—N/a	—N/a
Europe
February 11, 2004	Paris	France	Palais Omnisports de Paris-Bercy	Bjorn Again	—N/a	—N/a
February 13, 2004	Sheffield	England	Hallam FM Arena	Bjorn Again	—N/a	—N/a
February 14, 2004	Newcastle	England	Telewest Arena	Bjorn Again	—N/a	—N/a
February 16, 2004	London	England	Wembley Arena	Bjorn Again	—N/a	—N/a
February 17, 2004	London	England	Wembley Arena	Bjorn Again	—N/a	—N/a
February 19, 2004	Belfast	Northern Ireland	Odyssey Arena	Bjorn Again	—N/a	—N/a
February 20, 2004	Belfast	Northern Ireland	Odyssey Arena	Bjorn Again	—N/a	—N/a
February 22, 2004	Glasgow	Scotland	SEC Centre Hall 4	Bjorn Again	—N/a	—N/a
February 23, 2004	Birmingham	England	National Exhibition Centre	Bjorn Again	—N/a	—N/a
February 26, 2004	Manchester	England	Manchester Evening News Arena	Bjorn Again	18,300 / 18,300	—N/a
February 28, 2004	Hamburg	Germany	Color Line Arena	Bjorn Again	—N/a	—N/a
March 1, 2004	Stuttgart	Germany	Hanns-Martin-Schleyer-Halle	Bjorn Again	—N/a	—N/a
March 2, 2004	Munich	Germany	Olympiahalle	Bjorn Again	—N/a	—N/a
March 4, 2004	Rotterdam	Netherlands	Sportpaleis van Ahoy	Bjorn Again	—N/a	—N/a
March 5, 2004	Rotterdam	Netherlands	Sportpaleis van Ahoy	Bjorn Again	—N/a	—N/a
March 7, 2004	Birmingham	England	National Exhibition Centre	Bjorn Again	—N/a	—N/a
March 8, 2004	Sheffield	England	Hallam FM Arena	Bjorn Again	—N/a	—N/a
March 10, 2004	Glasgow	Scotland	Scottish Exhibition and Conference Centre	Bjorn Again	—N/a	—N/a
March 11, 2004	Newcastle	England	Telewest Arena	Bjorn Again	—N/a	—N/a
March 14, 2004	Stockholm	Sweden	Stockholm Globe Arena	Bjorn Again	—N/a	—N/a
March 16, 2004	Helsinki	Finland	Hartwall Arena	Bjorn Again	—N/a	—N/a
March 18, 2004	Oslo	Norway	Oslo Spektrum	Bjorn Again	—N/a	—N/a
March 20, 2004	Berlin	Germany	Max-Schmeling-Halle	Bjorn Again	—N/a	—N/a
March 22, 2004	Vienna	Austria	Wiener Stadthalle	Bjorn Again	—N/a	—N/a
March 23, 2004	Munich	Germany	Olympiahalle	Bjorn Again	—N/a	—N/a
March 25, 2004	Frankfurt	Germany	Festhalle	Bjorn Again	—N/a	—N/a
March 26, 2004	Frankfurt	Germany	Festhalle	Bjorn Again	—N/a	—N/a
March 29, 2004	Cologne	Germany	Kölnarena	Bjorn Again	—N/a	—N/a
March 30, 2004	Antwerp	Belgium	Sportpaleis	Bjorn Again	—N/a	—N/a
North America Leg 2
April 19, 2004	Pensacola	United States	Pensacola Civic Center	Emerson Drive	7,816 / 8,500	$568,160
April 23, 2004	Atlanta	United States	Philips Arena	Emerson Drive	15,779 / 17,992	$954,666
April 24, 2004	Knoxville	United States	Thompson–Boling Arena	Emerson Drive	12,247 / 12,950	$746,515
April 27, 2004	North Charleston	United States	North Charleston Coliseum	Emerson Drive	—N/a	—N/a
April 28, 2004	Columbia	United States	Colonial Center	Emerson Drive	—N/a	—N/a
April 30, 2004	Charlotte	United States	Charlotte Coliseum	Emerson Drive	10,000 / 23,000	—N/a
May 1, 2004	Raleigh	United States	RBC Center	Emerson Drive	—N/a	—N/a
May 4, 2004	Richmond	United States	Richmond Coliseum	Emerson Drive	10,813 / 10,813	$672,460
May 5, 2004	Uncasville	United States	Mohegan Sun Arena	Emerson Drive	—N/a	—N/a
May 6, 2004	Montreal	Canada	Bell Centre	Emerson Drive	18,092 / 18,092	$1,219,545
May 8, 2004	Quebec City	Canada	Colisée Pepsi	Emerson Drive	12,287 / 13,000	$833,338
May 10, 2004	London	Canada	John Labatt Centre	Emerson Drive	10,269 / 10,269	$781,589
May 11, 2004	London	Canada	John Labatt Centre	Emerson Drive	—N/a	—N/a
May 13, 2004	Charleston	United States	Charleston Civic Center	Emerson Drive	9,209 / 12,855	$508,055
May 14, 2004	Fort Wayne	United States	Allen County War Memorial Coliseum	Emerson Drive	10,887 / 10,887	$810,050
May 16, 2004	Grand Rapids	United States	Van Andel Arena	Emerson Drive	12,450 / 12,450	$822,580
May 19, 2004	Louisville	United States	Freedom Hall	Emerson Drive	16,246 / 18,120	$659,760
May 21, 2004	Columbus	United States	Value City Arena	Emerson Drive	17,359 / 17,359	$875,410
May 22, 2004	Cincinnati	United States	U.S. Bank Arena	Emerson Drive	16,220 / 17,838	$819,950
May 24, 2004	Moline	United States	The MARK of the Quad Cities	Emerson Drive	11,016 / 11,016	$782,215
May 25, 2004	Omaha	United States	Qwest Center Omaha	Emerson Drive	16,208 / 16,208	$1,110,670
June 3, 2004	Green Bay	United States	Resch Center	Emerson Drive	10,019 / 10,019	$776,255
June 4, 2004	Saint Paul	United States	Xcel Energy Center	Emerson Drive	16,277 / 16,277	$1,199,355
June 5, 2004	Fargo	United States	Fargodome	Emerson Drive	13,791 / 17,500	$861,575
June 8, 2004	Winnipeg	Canada	Winnipeg Arena	Emerson Drive	15,028 / 15,028	$1,031,442
June 9, 2004	Saskatoon	Canada	Saskatchewan Place	Emerson Drive	22,868 / 22,868	$1,580,249
June 11, 2004	Saskatoon	Canada	Saskatchewan Place	Emerson Drive	22,868 / 22,868	$1,580,249
June 12, 2004	Edmonton	Canada	Rexall Place	Emerson Drive	12,159 / 12,159	$825,270
June 14, 2004	Calgary	Canada	Pengrowth Saddledome	Emerson Drive	14,268 / 14,268	$977,606
June 17, 2004	Vancouver	Canada	Pacific Coliseum	Emerson Drive	12,203 / 12,203	$820,047
June 18, 2004	Seattle	United States	KeyArena	Emerson Drive	13,946 / 13,946	$920,535
June 19, 2004	Spokane	United States	Spokane Veterans Memorial Arena	Emerson Drive	11,755 / 11,755	$803,655
June 22, 2004	Fresno	United States	Save Mart Center	Emerson Drive	15,024 / 15,024	$1,080,544
June 23, 2004	Los Angeles	United States	Staples Center	Emerson Drive	16,547 / 17,515	$905,928
June 26, 2004	Lubbock	United States	United Spirit Arena	Emerson Drive	—N/a	—N/a
June 29, 2004	New Orleans	United States	New Orleans Arena	Emerson Drive	14,423 / 15,800	$908,080
June 30, 2004	Birmingham	United States	BJCC Arena	Emerson Drive	—N/a	—N/a
July 2, 2004	Greenville	United States	BI-LO Center	Emerson Drive	14,178 / 15,000	$523,055
July 6, 2004	Orlando	United States	TD Waterhouse Centre	Emerson Drive	—N/a	—N/a
July 7, 2004	Jacksonville	United States	Jacksonville Veterans Memorial Arena	Emerson Drive	—N/a	—N/a
July 9, 2004	Tampa	United States	St. Pete Times Forum	Emerson Drive	21,004 / 21,004	—N/a
July 10, 2004	Sunrise	United States	Office Depot Center	Emerson Drive	—N/a	—N/a

== Personnel ==
- Shania Twain – lead vocals
- Brent Barcus – guitar
- J. D. Blair – drums
- Roddy Chong – fiddle, guitar, mandolin, percussion
- Cory Churko – guitar, fiddle
- Allison Cornell – fiddle, keyboards, mandolin
- Andy Cichon – bass guitar
- Hardy Hemphill – keyboards, percussion, harmonica, accordion
- Marc Muller – pedal steel guitar
- Randall Waller – guitar

== Broadcasts and recordings ==
Before the tour commenced, Twain performed a series of free concerts in the United States and a paid concert in the United Kingdom. The official DVD for the Up! Tour was filmed on July 27, 2003, at Grant Park in Chicago. The performance was shown on NBC and CBC in August 2003, with the DVD released in November 2003. The performances of "She's Not Just a Pretty Face" and "It Only Hurts When I'm Breathing" were later used as music videos to promote the aforementioned singles. Up! Live in Chicago was certified platinum by the RIAA for shipments of over 500,000 copies in the United States. It was also certified platinum in Australia for shipments of 15,000 copies.
