= Up! (Shania Twain song) =

2003 single by Shania Twain

- UK single cover

Single by Shania Twain

from the album Up!
- B-side: "C'est la Vie"
- Released: January 6, 2003
- Studio: Compass Point (Nassau, Bahamas); Officine Meccaniche (Milan, Italy); Windmill Lane (Dublin, Ireland)
- Length: 2:53 (Red and Green versions); 3:13 (Blue version)
- Label: Mercury Nashville
- Songwriters: Robert John "Mutt" Lange; Shania Twain
- Producer: Robert John "Mutt" Lange

Shania Twain singles chronology
"I'm Gonna Getcha Good!" (2002)	"Up!" (2003)	"Ka-Ching!" (2003)

Music videos
- "Up!" (Green version) on YouTube; "Up!" (Red version) on YouTube; "Up!" (Blue version) on YouTube

"Up!" is a song by Canadian singer Shania Twain, recorded for her fourth studio album of the same name (2002). The track was written by Twain and her then-husband Robert John "Mutt" Lange, who also produced the song. It was first released on January 6, 2003, in North America.

Like all the songs on Up!, the track was recorded with three different alternate versions. The "red" version of the song would be released internationally while the "green" version was released only to North America and Australia respectively. Critical reception for "Up!" was favorable, with critics enjoying the song's production and Twain's vocals as being singable. The track proved to have decent success commercially, hitting number 12 on the US Billboard Hot Country Songs chart. In the United Kingdom, "Up!" was released as a double A-side single with "When You Kiss Me" on November 17, 2003, as the final single from the album there. "Up!" would eventually be released on March 8, 2004, as a standalone single in continental Europe. At the 2004 Juno Awards, "Up!" was named Country Recording of the Year.

== Critical reception ==
Reviews for "Up!" were favorable. Billboard magazine described the song as being "life-loving [and] instantly singable," and predicted "this one sounds like it's got the goods to go the distance". About.com praised the song’s technical side by saying "[t]he production is solid and Shania's tone is as good as ever vocally". Country Universe gave the song an A, saying the song is "one of those rare instances in which seemingly rudimentary ingredients combine with just the right musical chemistry to create something truly memorable and special."

== Music video ==
The music video for "Up!" was shot by Antti J in Madrid, alongside some scenes for the video of "Ka-Ching!". It was filmed in early January 2003 and released on January 11, 2003. All three album versions of the song were released: Red, Green and Blue. The video shows Twain in a white room, decorating a wall with memorabilia and photographs related to Shania. These include a glove from the "That Don't Impress Me Much" video, an AC/DC t-shirt worn on her Rolling Stone magazine cover, one picture of her parents, another with her dog, a Montreal Canadiens jersey and a Canadian flag. The video won the MuchMoreMusic Video of the Year Award at the 2003 MuchMusic Video Awards. Commercially it is available on select CD singles, the DVD-Audio version of Up! and at the iTunes Store.

== Chart performance ==
"Up!" debuted on the Billboard Hot Country Singles & Tracks chart the week of November 16, 2002, at number 57, based on album play alone, yet was still the highest debut of the week. The single spent 20 weeks on the chart and climbed to a peak position of number 12 on March 8, 2003, where it remained for one week. "Up!" became Twain's eighteenth top twenty single. On the Billboard Hot 100, "Up!" peaked at number 63 and at number 62 on the Hot 100 Airplay chart. In Shania's home country of Canada, the single reached number two on the physical sales-only Canadian Singles Chart.

"Up!" performed modestly internationally. The song peaked at number 29 on the ARIA Singles Chart in Australia and spent 6 weeks there. In neighboring New Zealand, the song reached number 27 on the RMNZ Singles Chart and charted for 7 weeks. "Up!" underperformed in Europe with the song failing to reach the top 20 in most of the countries it charted in; it did however peak at number 3 in Hungary.

== Promotion ==
As one of the first singles released from the Up! album, it was performed on several televised programs to boost airplay and sales. The first performance was in Edmonton at the 2002 Grey Cup. Two days later in New York City, the song was performed on The Today Show. Twain headed to Australia to promote the album, where she performed the song on Rove Live. Back in the United States, the song was performed in a medley with "I'm Gonna Getcha Good!" at the American Music Awards. The next day, Twain performed the song on The Tonight Show with Jay Leno. In April 2003, Twain opened the Juno Awards with "Up!". The most-watched performance of the song was in the Super Bowl XXXVII halftime show, where it was performed alongside "Man! I Feel Like a Woman!".

== Track listings ==
Australian maxi-CD single

1. "Up!" (red version) – 2:54
2. "You're Still the One" (live) – 3:29
3. "I'm Holdin' On to Love (To Save My Life)" (live) – 3:30

Australian CD single

1. "Up!" (green version) – 2:53
2. "I'm Gonna Getcha Good!" (Sowatt extended dance mix) – 7:57
3. "Ka-Ching!" (The Simon & Diamond bhangra mix) – 4:36

Canadian CD single

1. "Up!" (red version) – 2:53
2. "I'm Gonna Getcha Good!" (Sowatt extended dance mix) – 7:57

European maxi-CD single

1. "Up!" (red version) – 2:56
2. "Forever and for Always" (Live from Up! Live in Chicago) – 4:12
3. "When You Kiss Me" (Live from Up! Live in Chicago) – 4:18
4. Enhanced: "Up!" (video)

European CD single

1. "Up! (red version) – 2:56
2. "Forever and for Always" (Live from Up! Live in Chicago) – 4:16

German 3-inch CD single

1. "Up!" (red version) – 2:52
2. "Forever and for Always" (Live from Up! Live in Chicago) – 3:59

UK double a-side single

1. "Up!" – 2:53
2. "When You Kiss Me" – 4:08
3. "Ka-Ching!" (Live from Chicago) – 3:20
4. Enhanced: "Up!" (CD-ROM video)

Japanese CD single

1. "Up!" (Red) – 2:53
2. "Party for Two" (featuring Mark McGrath) – 3:34

== Charts ==
=== Weekly charts ===
Chart (2002–2004)	Peak position
Australia (ARIA)	29
Austria (Ö3 Austria Top 40)	26
Belgium (Ultratip Bubbling Under Flanders)	11
Belgium (Ultratip Bubbling Under Wallonia)	13
Canada (Nielsen SoundScan)	2
Canada Country (Nielsen BDS)	2
Europe (Eurochart Hot 100)	67
Germany (GfK)	42
Hungary (Rádiós Top 40)	3
Ireland (IRMA) with "When You Kiss Me"	41
New Zealand (Recorded Music NZ)	27
Scottish Singles Sales (Official Charts) with "When You Kiss Me"	20
Switzerland (Schweizer Hitparade)	51
UK Singles (Official Charts) with "When You Kiss Me"	21
US Billboard Hot 100	63
US Hot Country Songs (Billboard)	12

=== Year-end charts ===
Chart (2003)	Position
US Hot Country Songs (Billboard)	58

Chart (2004)	Position
Hungary (Rádiós Top 40)	37

== Certifications ==
Region	Certification	Certified units/sales
Japan (RIAJ)	Gold	100,000^{*}
United States (RIAA)	Gold	500,000^{‡}
^{*} Sales figures based on certification alone.^{‡} Sales+streaming figures based on certification alone.
