= Man! I Feel Like a Woman! =

1999 single by Shania Twain

- US promotional; Australian cover

Single by Shania Twain

from the album Come On Over
- B-side: "Don't Be Stupid (You Know I Love You)"; "Any Man of Mine"
- Released: March 1999
- Studio: Masterfonics (Nashville, Tennessee)
- Genre: Country pop; country rock
- Length: 3:53
- Label: Mercury Nashville
- Songwriters: Shania Twain; Robert John "Mutt" Lange
- Producer: Robert John "Mutt" Lange

Shania Twain singles chronology
"That Don't Impress Me Much" (1998)	"Man! I Feel Like a Woman!" (1999)	"You've Got a Way" (1999)

Music video
- "Man! I Feel Like a Woman!" on YouTube

Alternative cover
- European cover

"Man! I Feel Like a Woman!" is a song by Canadian singer-songwriter Shania Twain from her third studio album, Come On Over (1997). Written by Twain and her longtime collaborator and then-husband Robert John "Mutt" Lange, who also produced the track, the song was released first to North American country radio stations in March 1999 as the eighth single from the album, and it was released worldwide later the same year. "Man! I Feel Like a Woman!" is a country pop song with lyrics about female empowerment and remains one of Twain's biggest hits worldwide.

The song received generally favorable reviews from music critics, who praised the song's attitude and hook as well as Twain's vocals. Commercially, the song was also successful, reaching number one in New Zealand as well as the top 10 in six additional countries, while reaching the top 20 in Canada and number 23 on the US Billboard Hot 100 chart. It was more successful on the Hot Country Singles & Tracks chart, reaching the top five and was certified platinum by the Recording Industry Association of America (RIAA) for 1,000,000 digital downloads. The song earned Twain her second consecutive Grammy for Best Female Country Vocal Performance in 2000.

The accompanying music video for "Man! I Feel Like a Woman!" was released on March 3, 1999, and it pays homage to Robert Palmer's "Addicted to Love" music video, featuring Twain dancing with buffed and blank-eyed male models. It was the opener on both the Come On Over and Up! tours, as well as Twain's headline on the Super Bowl XXXVII Halftime show, and as the closer on the rest of her tours. It was also used to comic effect in a 2004 Chevrolet Colorado TV commercial, as well as being on the soundtrack of Brazilian telenovela Laços de Família. The song was also performed by American Idol winner Carrie Underwood during the fourth season, and by Britney Spears in her first movie Crossroads (2002).

== Background and release ==
Mutt gave that one a thumbs-up, no questions asked. He could recognize a hit idea when he heard one. His groove flowed easily, and that song came together between the two of us, without any push and pull.

— Twain on the writing process of the song.

The title and lyrics of the song were based on Shania Twain's experience while working at Deerhurst Resort in Huntsville, Ontario to provide for her brothers and sisters after their parents died in a car crash. Twain recalls seeing drag performers working at the resort and credits them as the source of her inspiration. Later in 1993, after being signed to Mercury Nashville and releasing her first album Shania Twain, Twain met Robert John "Mutt" Lange, whom she would collaborate extensively with and marry at the end of the year. In 1994, while composing songs for what would become her second studio album The Woman in Me, Lange played to Twain a riff he had been working on and Twain sang lyrics for what would become "Man! I Feel Like a Woman!" Speaking of the writing of the song, she stated "There was no time to waste on ideas that wouldn't make the album, but something like [the song] was just there. I was inspired right off the bat with that one, for example, by a riff Mutt had going, and the lyrics and phrasing just came out of the blue."

After reaching domestic success in the United States, and selling over 15 million copies with The Woman in Me, Twain was determined to become an international star and decided to do whatever was necessary to achieve her goal. In order to achieve a worldwide success, Twain recorded her third studio album, Come On Over, with the intention of being "international". After completing the album and delivering it to Mercury Records, Lange spent four months remixing 70 percent of the album for its international edition, diluting and removing the twang elements. While writing for the album, Twain and Lange revisited "Man! I Feel Like a Woman!" and insisted on having the track on the album. The track was then the final song recorded for Come On Over. The song is the opening track of the U.S. edition of Come On Over, however, the international edition starts with "You're Still the One", since the song has country elements. Initially, "Man! I Feel Like a Woman!" was only released to country radio as the album's seventh single in the United States in March 1999. After the song's success there, it was eventually released to mainstream radio in the U.S. In the United Kingdom, the song was issued as a CD single and cassette single on September 20, 1999.

== Composition and lyric ==
"Man! I Feel Like a Woman!" was written by Shania Twain and Robert John "Mutt" Lange, who also produced the track. According to the sheet music published at Musicnotes.com by Universal Music Publishing Group, the song starts in the key of B♭ major and modulates to F major in the chorus, with a moderate tempo of 126 beats per minute. Twain's vocals span from the low-note of F_{3} to the high note of D♭_{5}. "Man! I Feel Like a Woman!" is a country pop song, with a guitar riff that conjures Norman Greenbaum's "Spirit in the Sky", as noted by both Chuck Taylor of Billboard and J.D. Considine of Entertainment Weekly. It begins with Twain exclaiming, "Let's go girls". Lyrically, the song is a female empowerment track, with Twain insisting that "the best thing about being a woman is the prerogative to have a little fun" as well as promising to wear "men's shirts" with "short skirts". In an interview for Billboard, Twain further explained the song's lyrical meaning, elaborating:

That song started with the title, then it kind of wrote itself. The whole expression is a celebration of being a woman these days, I think we're kind of spoiled in a lot of ways, with the advantages we have. Feminists may not feel that way, but I do. It's pretty darn fun to be a woman.

In an interview with American LGBT-interest magazine The Advocate, Twain also discussed the song:

A lot of the stuff I do has such a feminine, female perspective, but a powerful one. It's not only girl power, it's gay power. I think that song really stands for both.

== Critical reception ==
The song received generally favourable reviews from music critics. Writing for Billboard, Chuck Taylor commented that "there's no reason that 'Man!', with its coquettish turn of phrase, shouldn't have the same kind of appeal as her earlier 'That Don't Impress Me Much'," also noting that the song has "plenty of tasty ingredients that radio traditionally searches out – great tempo, attitude, a hook that sells like ice cream in summer, and the instantly recognizable vocals of a woman who is a fond acquaintance of so many millions out there now." Taylor ultimately called it "country crossover at its best." Daily Record stated that Twain "enjoys a change of direction with this brassy line-dancing hit." Chuck Eddy of Rolling Stone noted that "Man! I Feel Like a Woman!" and other high-gloss songs "open with a bubblegum-glam cheerleader shout, then blasts into radio-ready rapture with offhand vocal interjections – doot-doot-doot scatting, do-si-do rapping, sexy squeaks, sarcastic Alanis Morissette asides." In 2024, Rolling Stone ranked the song at #30 on its 200 Greatest Country Songs of All Time ranking.

The staff from the Sputnikmusic website praised the track, calling it "a high point of the album with it being a classic example of upbeat feel-good power-pop, which is notable both for the production, something that is notably strong throughout the album, but also for the instrumental quality present. It's possible almost to feel the enjoyment that was present in making this song when listening to it, and there's even a guitar solo, which again pulls the listener in." While reviewing both Twain's "Come on Over" and "Greatest Hits" albums, Stephen Thomas Erlewine of Allmusic picked the song as one of the compilation's highlights, while Nick Reynolds of BBC Music named it "the sound of a thousand Saturday nights in clubs all over the Western World." Brian James wrote for PopMatters that the song "has a title-word-to-exclamation-point ratio that would make the headline writer at 'The National Enquirer' blush."

=== Accolades ===
"Man! I Feel Like a Woman!" earned Shania Twain her second consecutive Grammy Award for Best Female Country Vocal Performance in its 42nd edition, which also saw her winning another award for Best Country Song for the song "Come On Over". The song also won both BMI Songwriter Awards and SOCAN'S for "One of the Most Performed Songs of the Year". Kay Savage of CMT picked the track as one of her "10 Prime Hits", asking: "Is there any better song to start a Friday night than 'Man! I Feel Like a Woman!'?" Savage also wrote that the "Grammy-winning song brings out [her] best Southern qualities for a really-go-wild, doing-it-in-style, country good time. Shania even took the pain out of girls' usual conferences of 'what should I wear tonight' by providing a simple answer: men's shirts and short skirts. Genius." Laura McClellan of Taste of Country picked the song as her "All-Time Best Song", writing that "the track's iconic intro lick and catchy singalong vibe won this song a Grammy and a No. 4 slot on the country charts. The most staunch pop purists can still sing along to this one years later, even if they mumble the chorus a bit in the middle."

While listing the "Top 10 Girl Power Songs", The Boot website placed it at number ten, praising Shania for "embrac[ing] her inner feminist in this Grammy-winning single," calling it "music to any man's ears." In the same vein, Fatima Bhojani of Mother Jones magazine picked the line, "We don't need romance, we only wanna dance/We're gonna let our hair hang down," as the best lyric of the song. Writing for NPR Music, Ann Powers commented that the song "connects crossover country to the rock world in no uncertain terms, expanding the genre's heritage in ways that directly reflect the eclectic tastes of its younger audience." The A.V. Club editors, while analysing the "17 well-intended yet misguided feminist anthems", concluded that:

The boilerplate "Let's let our hair down and go crazy!" rah-rah message of Shania Twain's 1997 hit "Man! I Feel Like A Woman!" is so bland and uninspired it's practically nonexistent; it's basically a jingle for lady razors extended over three and a half minutes. The fact that Twain's version of female rebellion involves coloring her hair, talking loudly, and going out dancing with her friends raises the question of what sort of imaginary, Victorian-era standards she thinks she's rebelling against.

== Chart performance ==
=== North America ===
"Man! I Feel Like a Woman!" debuted on the US Billboard Hot Country Singles & Tracks chart on March 6, 1999, at number 53, becoming the highest debut of the week. The single spent 20 weeks on the chart and climbed to a peak position of number four on June 12, 1999, where it remained for two weeks. The single became Twain's 11th (and seventh consecutive) Top 10 on the country chart. On the US Billboard Hot 100, it debuted at number 93 on the week of April 17, 1999. It spent 28 weeks on the chart and peaked at number 23 for one week on November 13, 1999. Come on Over's fifth US adult contemporary release, "Man! I Feel Like a Woman!" debuted at number 29 the week of October 2, 1999, the highest debut of the week. The single spent 26 weeks on the chart and climbed to a peak position of number 16 on December 18, 1999, where it remained for one week. While on the Adult Top 40, it debuted at number 30 and peaked at number 12. On the Top 40 Tracks chart, the song debuted at number 32 and peaked at number 20. The song has sold 853,000 digital copies in the US as of September 2015.

=== Australia and Europe ===
"Man! I Feel Like a Woman!" became Twain's second consecutive number one in New Zealand, after "That Don't Impress Me Much". And like her previous number one this also debuted at the top spot, and was certified platinum, making it her biggest single in that country. In Australia, the song debuted at number five and peaked at number four a week later, becoming her fifth consecutive top-five single. In France, the song became her first and only top-10 single, spending 31 weeks on the chart while spending 13 weeks inside the top 10 and three weeks at its peak position at number three. In the UK, "Man! I Feel Like a Woman!" became Twain's second-highest-selling single, being certified double platinum. The song debuted at its peak position at number three, on October 2, 1999, where it remained for two weeks. It remained in the top ten for another two weeks. It remained on the entire chart for 18 weeks. "Man! I Feel Like a Woman!" became Twain's fourth top-ten hit (and third consecutive) in the UK.

== Music video ==
The music video for "Man! I Feel Like a Woman!" was shot in New York City and directed by Paul Boyd. The wardrobe for the video was designed by Marc Bouwer. It debuted on March 3, 1999, on CMT. The video is a role-reversed version of Robert Palmer's "Addicted to Love" and "Simply Irresistible" music videos. In the music video, Twain stands in front of a group of men, all dressed alike, one playing electric guitar, one playing bass, one playing drums, one playing a two-neck guitar, and one playing keyboard, complete with buffed and blank-eye, meant to imitate the women from Palmer's videos. Twain starts the video dressed in a long coat and a veiled top hat, white dress shirt, black tie, but throughout the video she strips off items of clothing until she is left wearing a black corset, mini skirt, thigh-high boots, a black choker, and black gloves. Twain even has black eyeshadow on.

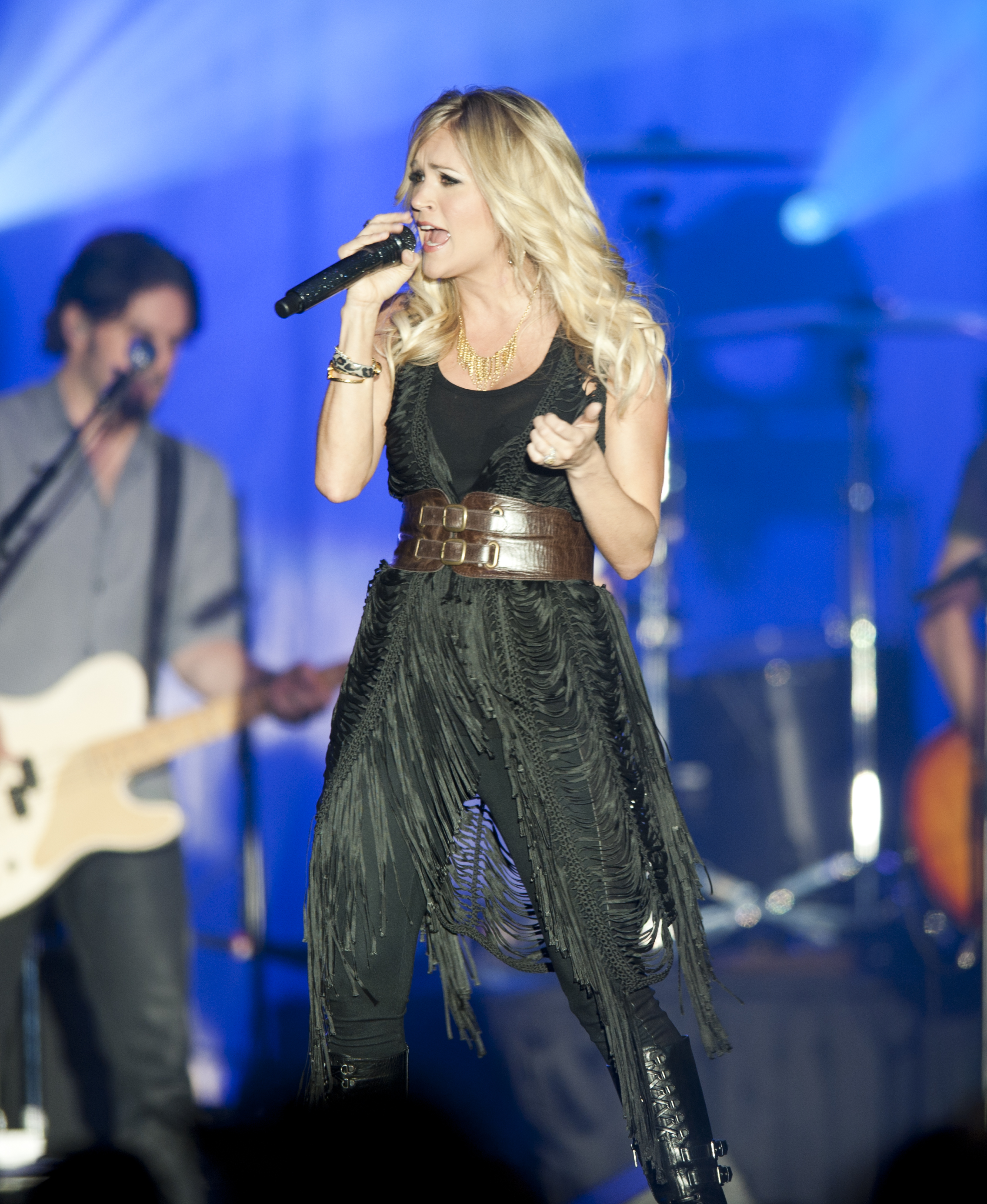
American singer-songwriter Carrie Underwood covered the song on "American Idol".

The video won the MuchMoreMusic Video of the Year award at the MuchMusic Video Awards in 2000. The video uses the 'Alternate Mix', which tones down the guitar and synth parts and blends them into the background. The 'Alternate Mix' of the video is available on Twain's compilations Come On Over: Video Collection (1999) and The Platinum Collection (2001), though an alternate version of the video using the 'International Version' was used as a backdrop for Twain's performance of the song on her Top of the Pops special in 1999. On YouTube, "Man! I Feel Like a Woman!" is Twain's most-viewed video with 394 million views as of December 2023. On November 1, 2022, a remastered HD version of the music video, using the 'Original Album Version', was released to commemorate the 25th anniversary of the parent album Come On Over.

== Live performances ==
Shania Twain performed the song on her "Come On Over Tour" (1998), "Up! Tour" (2003), "Shania: Still the One" residency show (2012–2014), "Rock This Country Tour" (2015), "Shania Now Tour" (2018), "Let's Go" residency show (2019–2022) and Queen of Me Tour (2023). Earlier on in her career, the song tended to be sung first but it now tends to be at the end as an encore, such is its popularity. It was also the opening song of her "Shania Twain Live", "Winter Break" and "Up! Live in Chicago" live video albums, as well as on her headline on the Super Bowl XXXVII halftime show. The song was also performed by American Idol winner Carrie Underwood during the fourth season. During Harry Styles' Coachella performance on April 15, he sang the song along with Twain along with You're Still The One.

== Track listings ==
- Australian CD single
1. "Man! I Feel Like a Woman!" (international album version) – 3:57
2. "I'm Holdin' On to Love (To Save My Life)" (pop mix) – 3:48
3. "Love Gets Me Every Time" (Mach 3 remix) – 3:42
4. "Man! I Feel Like a Woman!" (alternate mix) – 3:59
5. "Man! I Feel Like a Woman!" (video)
- European CD single
1. "Man! I Feel Like a Woman!" – 3:54
2. "Don't Be Stupid (You Know I Love You)" (extended dance mix) – 4:44
- European maxi-CD single
1. "Man! I Feel Like a Woman!" – 3:54
2. "Black Eyes, Blue Tears" (Live/Direct TV mix) – 4:22
3. "That Don't Impress Me Much" (India mix) – 4:42
4. "Man! I Feel Like a Woman!" (alternate version) – 3:53
- UK CD1
1. "Man! I Feel Like a Woman!" (country LP version) – 3:53
2. "Love Gets Me Every Time" (Live/Direct TV mix) – 3:51
3. "Any Man of Mine" – 4:07
4. "Man! I Feel Like a Woman!" (video)
- UK CD2
1. "Man! I Feel Like a Woman!" (country LP version) – 3:53
2. "Don't Be Stupid (You Know I Love You)" (extended dance mix) – 4:44
3. "Any Man of Mine" – 4:07
4. "Man! I Feel Like a Woman!" (video) – 3:53
- UK cassette single
1. "Man! I Feel Like a Woman!" (country LP version) – 3:53
2. "Don't Be Stupid (You Know I Love You)" (extended dance mix) – 4:44

== Credits and personnel ==
Credits are taken from the Come On Over album booklet.

Studio

- Recorded and mastered at Masterfonics (Nashville, Tennessee)

Personnel

- Shania Twain – writing, vocals, background vocals
- Robert John "Mutt" Lange – writing, background vocals, production
- Biff Watson – guitars
- Dann Huff – guitars, guitar solo, guitar textures, six-string bass, talk box
- Brent Mason – electric guitar
- Larry Byrom – slide guitar
- Paul Franklin – pedal steel guitar
- Joe Chemay – electric and fretless bass
- Stuart Duncan – fiddle
- Bow Bros – gang fiddles
- John Hobbs – Wurlitzer
- Paul Leim – drums
- Mike Shipley – mixing
- Olle Romo – programming, Pro Tools, sequencing, editing
- Glenn Meadows – mastering

== Charts ==
=== Weekly charts ===
Chart (1999–2000)	Peak position
Australia (ARIA)	4
Austria (Ö3 Austria Top 40)	11
Belgium (Ultratop 50 Flanders)	16
Belgium (Ultratop 50 Wallonia)	7
Canada Top Singles (RPM)	17
Canada Adult Contemporary (RPM)	9
Canada Country Singles (RPM)	2
Canada CHR (Nielsen BDS)	4
Europe (Eurochart Hot 100)	10
France (SNEP)	3
Germany (GfK)	33
Ireland (IRMA)	8
Netherlands (Dutch Top 40)	7
Netherlands (Single Top 100)	10
New Zealand (Recorded Music NZ)	1
Poland Airplay (Music & Media)	17
Scottish Singles Sales (Official Charts)	2
Spain (Promusicae)	11
Sweden (Sverigetopplistan)	20
Switzerland (Schweizer Hitparade)	43
UK Singles (Official Charts)	3
US Billboard Hot 100	23
US Adult Contemporary (Billboard)	16
US Adult Pop Airplay (Billboard)	12
US Hot Country Songs (Billboard)	4
US Pop Airplay (Billboard)	19
US Top 40 Tracks (Billboard)	20

Chart (2022)	Peak position
Canada Digital Song Sales (Billboard)	34

Chart (2026)	Peak position
Poland (Polish Airplay Top 100)	85

=== Year-end charts ===
Chart (1999)	Position
Australia (ARIA)	44
Belgium (Ultratop 50 Flanders)	95
Canada Adult Contemporary (RPM)	66
Canada Country Tracks (RPM)	25
Netherlands (Dutch Top 40)	34
Netherlands (Single Top 100)	60
New Zealand (RIANZ)	15
UK Singles (OCC)	47
UK Airplay (Music Week)	30
US Billboard Hot 100	77
US Adult Top 40 (Billboard)	65
US Hot Country Singles & Tracks (Billboard)	38
US Mainstream Top 40 (Billboard)	84

Chart (2000)	Position
Belgium (Ultratop 50 Wallonia)	49
Europe (European Hot 100 Singles)	49
France (SNEP)	22
US Adult Contemporary (Billboard)	38
US Adult Top 40 (Billboard)	92

== Certifications and sales ==
Region	Certification	Certified units/sales
Australia (ARIA)	Platinum	70,000^{^}
Belgium (BRMA)	Gold	25,000^{*}
Canada (Music Canada)	6× Platinum	480,000^{‡}
Denmark (IFPI Danmark)	Gold	45,000^{‡}
New Zealand (RMNZ)	4× Platinum	120,000^{‡}
United Kingdom (BPI)	2× Platinum	1,200,000
United States (RIAA)	3× Platinum	3,000,000^{‡}
^{*} Sales figures based on certification alone.^{^} Shipments figures based on certification alone.^{‡} Sales+streaming figures based on certification alone.

== Release history ==
Region	Date	Format(s)	Label(s)	Ref.
United States	March 1999	Country radio	Mercury	
United Kingdom	September 20, 1999	CD; cassette single	Mercury	

== Usage in pop culture and Legacy ==
The song was featured in a 2005 episode of America's Funniest Home Videos in a montage showing clips of women. The song was part of the soundtrack of Brazilian successful telenovela Laços de Família. American recording artist Britney Spears and actresses Zoe Saldaña and Taryn Manning sang along to the track during Spears' first movie Crossroads (2002). In that same year, it was performed by Molly Shannon in the form of a Christmas spoof in The Santa Clause 2. It was used to comic effect in a 2004 Chevrolet Colorado TV commercial, in which a group of men are traveling in one of the vehicles, and one of them begins singing along very enthusiastically with Twain's recording (from the female narrative), much to the discomfort of his friends.

It also appeared to comedic effect in an episode of Limmy's Show, in which Limmy aka Brian Limond plays a woman dressed in leopard print halter top and leather skirt, attempting to corral the viewer into declaring "let's go, girls!" following the song's opening riff. On the third attempt, the camera appears to accelerate towards this character, striking her and propelling her across the Glasgow skyline. The woman finally falls to the ground after colliding with a tall building, revealing in the process that she is wearing a strap-on dildo beneath her skirt. The scene ends with the woman lying in great pain and embarrassment.

Japanese-British singer Rina Sawayama also references "Man! I Feel Like a Woman!" in her 2022 song "This Hell", which begins with the line, "Let's go, girls".
