= When You Kiss Me =

2003 single by Shania Twain

Single by Shania Twain

from the album Up!
- B-side: "I'm Gonna Getcha Good!"; "Up!"; "Ka-Ching!"
- Released: November 10, 2003
- Studio: Compass Point (Nassau, Bahamas); Officine Meccaniche (Milan, Italy); Windmill Lane (Dublin, Ireland)
- Length: 4:08
- Label: Mercury Nashville
- Songwriters: Robert John "Mutt" Lange; Shania Twain
- Producer: Robert John "Mutt" Lange

Shania Twain singles chronology
"She's Not Just a Pretty Face" (2003)	"When You Kiss Me" (2003)	"It Only Hurts When I'm Breathing" (2004)

Music videos
- "When You Kiss Me" on YouTube; "When You Kiss Me" (Alternative version) on YouTube

"When You Kiss Me" is a song recorded by Canadian singer Shania Twain. It was released as the seventh single from her fourth studio album Up! (2002) on November 10, 2003, exclusively in Europe and Australia, although its music video was later released to the US. The song was written by Twain and her then-husband Robert John "Mutt" Lange. Twain described on several occasions that "When You Kiss Me" is her favorite ballad off Up!

The song peaked at number four in Portugal, number 21 in the UK, and number 60 on the US country chart. The music video was later released to Country Music Television. In the British Isles, "When You Kiss Me" was released as a double A-side with "Up!". Twain performed the song on the Up! Tour.

== Critical reception ==
About.com compared the song to "You're Still the One", and complimented the "stupendous mandolin and steel guitar textures overlaid by a wonderful chorus lyric".

== Chart performance ==
In the United Kingdom and Ireland, "When You Kiss Me" was released as a double A-side single with "Up!". On November 23, 2003, it debuted at number 21 on the UK Singles Chart. It spent five weeks on the chart. In Ireland, the song hit the chart for one week in November, placing at number 41. When Up! was released in 2002, "When You Kiss Me" gained enough album play to reach number 60 on the Billboard Hot Country Singles & Tracks chart.

== Music video ==
The "When You Kiss Me" video

The music video for "When You Kiss Me" was shot in Takapuna, New Zealand, by director Paul Boyd. It was originally released in Europe on October 17, 2003, and was added to CMT's playlists for the week of October 26, 2003. It was then re-released to CMT in the summer of 2004. Two versions of the video were made. The main version features Twain being filmed in a house, a boat, and on Bethells Beach by a young man. The alternate version, titled the 'One-Take Version', features Twain walking on a beach at night, with the camera performing one long take. Both videos are available on enhanced CD singles and the DVD single.

== Track listings ==
German and Australian CD maxi

1. "When You Kiss Me" (Red) – 4:08
2. "I'm Gonna Getcha Good!" (Live from Chicago) – 4:47
3. "Ka-Ching!" (Live from Chicago) – 3:41
4. Enhanced: When You Kiss Me – Music Video

German 3-inch CD single

1. "When You Kiss Me" (Red) – 4:08
2. "When You Kiss Me" (Metro Remix – Extended Mix) – 6:55

European CD single

1. "When You Kiss Me" (Red) – 4:08
2. "When You Kiss Me" (Metro Mix Extended) – 6:55

UK CD single – "When You Kiss Me / Up!"

1. "When You Kiss Me" (Red) – 4:08
2. "Up! (Red)" – 2:53
3. "I'm Gonna Getcha Good!" (Live from Chicago) – 4:30
4. Enhanced: "When You Kiss Me" – Music Video
5. Enhanced: "Up!" (Excerpt) – Video

UK CD single – "Up! / When You Kiss Me"

1. "Up! (Red) – 2:53
2. "When You Kiss Me" (Red) – 4:08
3. "Ka-Ching!"(Live from Chicago) – 3:20
4. Enhanced: "Up!" – Music Video

UK DVD single – "When You Kiss Me / Up!"

1. "When You Kiss Me" – Video
2. "Up!" – Audio
3. "When You Kiss Me" (Metro Remix Extended) – Audio
4. "Up!" – Video Excerpt

== Charts ==
Weekly chart performance for "When You Kiss Me"
Chart (2002–2004)	Peak position
Australia (ARIA)	47
Austria (Ö3 Austria Top 40)	32
Germany (GfK)	30
Ireland (IRMA) with "Up!"	41
Portugal (AFP)	4
Scotland Singles (Official Charts) with "Up!"	20
Switzerland (Schweizer Hitparade)	47
UK Singles (Official Charts) with "Up!"	21
US Hot Country Songs (Billboard)	60

== Release history ==
Release dates and formats for "When You Kiss Me"
Region	Date	Format(s)	Label	Ref.
Germany	November 10, 2003	CD single	Mercury	
United Kingdom	November 17, 2003	CD single; cassette single	Mercury	
