= The Complete Limelight Sessions =

Demo album by Shania Twain
- Released: October 23, 2001
- Recorded: 1989–1990
- Length: 64:05
- Label: Limelight; Universal Music
- Producer: Harry Hinde

Shania Twain chronology
Come On Over (1997)	The Complete Limelight Sessions (2001)	Up! (2002)

Singles from The Complete Limelight Sessions
- 1. "It's Alright" Released: 2001; 2. "The Heart Is Blind" Released: December 2001

Professional ratings
Review scores
Source	Rating
About.com	(positive) link
AllMusic	link
Entertainment Weekly	C− link
Mojo	(positive) link

The Complete Limelight Sessions is a collection of songs recorded by Canadian singer-songwriter Shania Twain, before she signed a record deal with Mercury Nashville in 1993. It was released in North America on October 23, 2001, following the success of Come On Over. The album was promoted by remixes of "It's Alright", Twain's only song to chart on Billboard's Hot Dance Club Play chart. "The Heart Is Blind" was released throughout December 2001 to country radio and adult contemporary radio, but did not chart.

The songs from this album were previously released in July 2000 throughout Europe on the RWP Label as Wild & Wicked and originally came with a free poster. It charted on the UK Albums Chart at number 62 for two weeks. In the following years, the songs were released with varying tracklists (leaving out some songs and/or adding remixes) under various names, including Beginnings, On the Way or a song title from the album. None of these releases were official.

== Track listing ==
All tracks produced by Harry Hinde.

The Complete Limelight Sessions
No.	Title	Writer(s)	Length
1.	"It's Alright"	Larry Graham	3:24
2.	"Love"	Shania Twain; Paul Sabu	2:40
3.	"All Fired Up, No Place to Go"	Twain; Sabu	3:19
4.	"The Heart Is Blind"	Paul Janz; Rhonda Fleming	3:42
5.	"For the Love of Him"	Bobbi Martin; Al Mortimer	2:48
6.	"Wild and Wicked"	Twain; Sabu	3:33
7.	"I Ain't Gonna Eat Out My Heart Anymore"	Lori Burton; Pamela Sawyer	3:20
8.	"Send it With Love"	Twain; Sabu	3:55
9.	"Half Breed"	Al Capps; Mary Dean	2:52
10.	"Hate to Love"	Twain; Sabu	4:01
11.	"Bite My Lip"	Twain; Sabu	2:45
12.	"Two Hearts One Love"	Twain; Sabu	3:44
13.	"Rhythm Made Me Do It"	Twain; Sabu	3:51
14.	"Luv Eyes"	Twain; Sabu	3:34
15.	"Lost My Heart"	Twain; Sabu	4:26
16.	"Don't Give Me That (Once Over)"	Stan Meissner; Fred Mollin	3:47
17.	"It's Alright" (edited club mix)	Graham	3:40
18.	"The Heart Is Blind" (single version)	Janz; Fleming	4:14
Total length:			64:05

Wild & Wicked
No.	Title	Length
1.	"Bite My Lip"	2:42
2.	"Wild and Wicked"	3:09
3.	"Send It with Love"	3:45
4.	"(Don't Give Me That) Once Over"	3:49
5.	"Hate to Love"	4:04
6.	"Luv Eyes"	3:41
7.	"I Lost My Heart When I Found You"	4:20
8.	"Rhythm Made Me Do It"	3:47
9.	"Two Hearts One Love"	3:38
10.	"Half Breed"	3:13
11.	"For the Love of Him"	3:35
12.	"For the Love of Him" (dance mix)	5:15
Total length:		44:58

Note

- Track 18, "The Heart Is Blind" (single version), was only available on certain "Extra Track" copies in the United States & Europe.

== Personnel ==
- Bob Babbitt – bass guitar
- Claude Desjardins – drums, bass guitar, keyboards, programming
- Gord Heins - electric guitar
- Barry Keane – drums
- Paul Sabu – acoustic guitar
- Shania Twain – lead vocals, backing vocals

== Charts ==
Chart (1999–2001)	Peak position
Canadian Albums (Billboard)	93
Dutch Albums (Album Top 100)	65
Scottish Albums (OCC)	48
UK Albums (OCC)	62
US Top Country Albums (Billboard)	43
US Independent Albums (Billboard)	23

== Certifications ==
Region	Certification	Certified units/sales
United Kingdom (BPI)	Silver	60,000^{*}
^{*} Sales figures based on certification alone.

== Release history ==
Region	Date	Title	Label	Format	Catalog
Netherlands	September 17, 1999	On the Way	NMC	CD with 10 songs	5038894000825
Europe	November 11, 1999	For the Love of Him	LLD	CD with 12 songs	630428100121
North America	1999	Beginnings (1989–1990)	Jomato	CD with 12 songs	4006408215929
Australia	1999	Beginnings (1989–1990)	Valley	CD with 12 songs	9399120150841
United Kingdom	April 17, 2000	Wild & Wicked	RWP	CD with 12 songs	5033809112327
Europe	2000	Impressions of a Woman	JABA	CD with 12 songs	7619941261741
United States	October 23, 2001	The Complete Limelight Sessions	Limelight	CD with 17 or 18 songs	684038814022
