= The Specials (Shania Twain video) =

Video by Shania Twain
- Released: November 20, 2001
- Length: 90 minutes
- Label: Mercury Nashville
- Director: Lawrence Jordan

Shania Twain chronology
The Platinum Collection (2001)	The Specials (2001)	A Collection of Video Hits (2002)

The Specials, also titled Live in Miami in some regions, is a home video by Shania Twain released on November 20, 2001 in DVD and VHS formats, under Mercury Records. It consists of two network specials that aired during the tour for her blockbuster 1997 album, Come On Over. "The Specials" was released two weeks after Twain's first compilation video The Platinum Collection (DVD).

The first special featured on the home video, Winter Break, was recorded at the Bayfront Park Amphitheater in Miami, Florida on January 17, 1999, for a crowd of 10,000 people. During the show, Twain received special guests Elton John, the Backstreet Boys and Leahy onstage. The special features scenes of Twain visiting her hometown Timmins, Ontario in between songs. It aired on March 3, 1999 on CBS, attracting ratings of 10.3 points , about 18.7 million viewers.

The second special, entitled Come On Over, aired on November 25, 1999. Twain performed for a crowd of 40,000 people following a Dallas Cowboys and Miami Dolphins game at the Texas Stadium in Dallas, Texas. Most of her hit songs at the time made the setlist cut, including Rock This Country!, whose music video was taken off the special. A performance of her 1996 No. 1 song You Win My Love was cut from the final version due to issues with the sound. Scenes from Twain interacting with the Cowboys and their cheerleaders, as well as preparing for the show with her band were shown in between songs. The program attracted ratings of 9.9 points on CBS, competing with Friends's episode "The One Where Ross Gets High" for the top spot of most watched program of that time window..

== Setlists ==
Winter Break Special
No.	Title	Length
1.	"Shania in Timmins, Ontario"
2.	"Man! I Feel Like a Woman!"
3.	"Honey, I'm Home"
4.	"All I Have to Give" (performed by Backstreet Boys)
5.	"Shania Talks About Her Childhood"
6.	"You're Still the One"/"Something About the Way You Look Tonight" (medley; with Elton John)
7.	"Amneris' Letter" (with Elton John)
8.	"Shania Talks About the Beginning of Her Career"
9.	"That Don't Impress Me Much"
10.	"Shania Remembers Her Parents"
11.	"From This Moment On" (with Backstreet Boys)
12.	"Don't Be Stupid (You Know I Love You)" (with Leahy)
13.	"(If You're Not in It for Love) I'm Outta Here!"
14.	"Credits"
Total length:		45:23

Come On Over Special
No.	Title	Length
1.	"Pre-Show / Pre-Game"
2.	"Honey, I'm Home"
3.	"Rock This Country!"
4.	"In the Locker Room"
5.	"Don't Be Stupid (You Know I Love You)"
6.	"Come on Over"
7.	"You're Still the One"
8.	"Shania with the Dallas Cowboy Cheerleaders"
9.	"Man! I Feel Like a Woman!"
10.	"On the Field with the Cowboys"
11.	"Any Man of Mine"
12.	"That Don't Impress Me Much"
13.	"(If You're Not in It for Love) I'm Outta Here!"
14.	"Credits"
Total length:		42:50

== Certifications and sales ==
Region	Certification	Certified units/sales
Brazil (Pro-Música Brasil)	Gold	25,000^{*}
United Kingdom (BPI)	Gold	25,000^{*}
^{*} Sales figures based on certification alone.
