= Rock This Country! =

2000 single by Shania Twain

Single by Shania Twain

from the album Come On Over
- Released: January 10, 2000
- Studio: Masterfonics (Nashville, Tennessee)
- Length: 4:23 (album version); 3:59 (radio edit)
- Label: Mercury Nashville
- Songwriters: Robert John "Mutt" Lange; Shania Twain
- Producer: Robert John "Mutt" Lange

Shania Twain singles chronology
| "Come On Over" (1999) | "Rock This Country!" (2000) | "I'm Holdin' On to Love (To Save My Life)" (2000) |

Audio video
- "Rock This Country!" on YouTube

"Rock This Country!" is a song co-written and performed by Canadian country music singer Shania Twain. It was the eleventh single released from her third studio album Come on Over. Written by Robert John "Mutt" Lange and Twain, "Rock This Country!" was released to North American country radio stations in late 1999. With no promotional performances or CD single, the song was the lowest charting single at country radio from the album. Despite this, Twain has performed the song on every one of her tours: the Come On Over Tour, Up! Tour, the tour of the same name, Now Tour, and the Queen of Me Tour usually as the opener or closer. She also performed the song on the Let's Go! residency, and in an acoustic version for the Still the One residency.

== Background ==
On "Rock This Country!" Twain said the song is "a very live, fast-driving song. We wrote that one on the beach in Florida. I had had the title a long time". It is the only song on the original version of Come On Over that is not remixed for the international version. Al Gore used "Rock This Country!" as the theme song to his 2000 Presidential Campaign. Hillary Clinton selected "Rock This Country!" as a candidate theme song for her 2008 Presidential campaign.

== Critical reception ==
Billboard applauded the song saying it "pushes all the buttons that should make it a natural for today's young country audience" and calling it "a rollicking, fiddle-laced number that should become a weekend anthem".

== Music video ==
The music video for "Rock This Country!" was taken directly from Twain's 1999 Come on Over special from Dallas. It was filmed on November 25, 1999, and released on December 23, 1999. Directing credit is given to Larry Jordan. This video was the second consecutive live video released from the Come on Over album, and third overall, as both "Honey, I'm Home" and "Come on Over" were issued live videos. The video is known for Twain's "space-age" looking outfit. It is available on Twain's DVD The Platinum Collection (2001).

== Chart performance ==
"Rock This Country!" debuted on the Billboard Hot Country Singles & Tracks chart the week of January 15, 2000, at number 58. The single spent 17 weeks on the chart and climbed to a peak position of number 30 on February 26, 2000, where it remained for three weeks. "Rock This Country!" became the first and only single from Come on Over to miss the top 20. It also became her lowest peaking single since "God Bless the Child", which peaked at number 48.

== Charts ==
| Chart (2000) | Peak position |
|---|---|
| Canada Country Singles (RPM) | 3 |
| US Hot Country Songs (Billboard) | 30 |
