= Up! (album) =

Studio album by Shania Twain
- Released: November 19, 2002 (US)
- Recorded: Fall 2001 – Summer 2002
- Studios: Compass Point Studios (Nassau, Bahamas); Officine Meccaniche (Milan, Italy); Windmill Lane Studios (Dublin, Ireland); Anupama Audio Visuals (Mumbai, India)
- Genres: Country; pop; world
- Length: 73:08 (red disc); 72:55 (green disc); 73:26 (blue disc)
- Label: Mercury Nashville
- Producers: Robert John "Mutt" Lange; Simon & Diamond Duggal

Shania Twain chronology
The Complete Limelight Sessions (2001)	Up! (2002)	Greatest Hits (2004)

Singles from Up!
- 1. "I'm Gonna Getcha Good!" Released: October 7, 2002; 2. "Up!" Released: January 6, 2003; 3. "Ka-Ching!" Released: February 17, 2003; 4. "Forever and for Always" Released: April 7, 2003; 5. "Thank You Baby! (For Makin' Someday Come So Soon)" Released: August 11, 2003; 6. "She's Not Just a Pretty Face" Released: October 6, 2003; 7. "When You Kiss Me" Released: November 10, 2003; 8. "It Only Hurts When I'm Breathing" Released: February 9, 2004

Up! is the fourth studio album by Canadian singer-songwriter Shania Twain. It was released on November 19, 2002, by Mercury Nashville. Three versions of the album were released: a pop version (red disc), a country version (green disc), and a version in the style of Indian film music (blue disc). It was also released in DVD-Audio (DVD-A) format containing a 5.1 mix as well as the stereo mix of the "Red" (Pop) version in 24-bit 96kHz high definition audio. This was the last studio album of Twain's career to be produced by her then-husband Robert John "Mutt" Lange before their divorce and her last studio release until 2017's Now.

The album became a commercial success. Up! gave Twain her best first week sales in the United States, debuting at number one on the Billboard 200 and Top Country Albums charts, later becoming the best-selling country album of 2003 in the US and third overall among all genres. Internationally, Up! was a commercial success, entering the top ten in almost all the markets it entered and topped the charts in Australia, Twain's native Canada, Germany, New Zealand, and the UK country charts. On September 23, 2004, the RIAA certified Up! at eleven-times platinum, giving her the distinction of being the only female artist to have three consecutive diamond albums released in the United States. The album was promoted with multiple interviews and live performances including the 2003 Super Bowl halftime show and the successful Up! Tour.

Eight singles were released from the album in total, which varied by region. "I'm Gonna Getcha Good!" became a top-ten success across Europe while also hitting number seven on the US Billboard Hot Country Songs chart. "Up!" reached the top-20 of the country airplay chart while hitting the top five in Canada and Hungary. The Europe-exclusive "Ka-Ching!" became Twain's biggest success in the continent while "Forever and for Always" was the album's best-performing single on the US Billboard Hot 100. "Thank You Baby!" was a moderate hit in Europe. "When You Kiss Me" was released as a double A-side with "Up!", reaching the top-forty in the United Kingdom. "She's Not Just a Pretty Face" would be Twain's last solo top-ten hit on the country charts while "It Only Hurts When I'm Breathing" became a minor top-twenty Adult Contemporary hit.

== Production ==
Writing and recording for the album took place around the world. According to the album booklet, Twain and Lange wrote and recorded in Berlin, Rome, Vienna, Paris, Avignon, Provence, Milan, Dublin, the Bahamas (at the famous Compass Point Studios), The Grenadine Islands, and Mumbai. For the blue international disc, the pair enlisted British-Asian music producers Simon and Diamond Duggal for production collaboration. Canadian folk music group Leahy provided group fiddles throughout the album.

== Release and promotion ==
When the album was originally released, different regions received different versions of the album. North America received a two-disc set, containing the red disc and the green disc. Most international markets received a two-disc set, referred to as the "International Version", containing the red disc and the blue disc. Both two-disc versions contain a note from Shania offering free downloads of whichever set of mixes not included (e.g. a download of the blue version is offered with the red/green set), for a limited time on her website. Australia received both two-disc sets, with the red/green version being subtitled "U.S. Version". The album was later re-released in some territories as a single-disc set, containing only the red mixes, and an alternate cover with a red background.

The red and green versions were released on vinyl in the United States and Europe on October 14, 2016. They are sold separately, and are featured on translucent red and green vinyl, respectively. This marks the first time the green version was released physically in Europe. A DVD-Audio (DVD-A) disc containing a 5.1 surround sound mix and the "Red" (Pop) stereo version was released in 2003.

Twain launched an extensive promotional tour for the album, starting in October 2002. Major events included the Super Bowl XXXVII halftime show, the 2002 and 2003 Country Music Association Awards, the 2003 American Music Awards, the 2003 Juno Awards, the 2003 ECHO Awards, the 2003 Billboard Music Awards, and the 2003 CMT Flameworthy Awards.

On October 2, 2002, Twain performed on the Dutch program TROS TV Show. On October 5 she appeared on Wetten, dass..?. On October 19 she appeared on the BBC show Parkinson and on France's Star Academy. On October 26 she filmed a mini-concert for CD:UK. On November 6, she launched the US leg of the promotional tour by opening the 2002 Country Music Awards. On November 24, Twain performed in Edmonton at the 2002 Grey Cup halftime show.

Twain embarked on the successful Up! Tour in September 2003. In 2007, the album's cover was listed on Maxim's Sexiest Album Covers.

== Critical reception ==
Professional ratings
Aggregate scores
Source	Rating
Metacritic	72/100
Review scores
Source	Rating
About.com	4/5 stars
AllMusic	4.5/5 stars
Blender	4/5 stars
Entertainment.ie	3/5 stars
Entertainment Weekly	A
PopMatters	6/10 stars
Robert Christgau	(1-star Honorable Mention)
Rolling Stone	4/5 stars
The Rolling Stone Album Guide	3/5 stars
Yahoo! Music UK	6/10 stars

Upon its release, the album received positive reviews from most music critics, based on an aggregate score of 72/100 from Metacritic. AllMusic editor Stephen Thomas Erlewine rated it 4.5/5 stars, praising Twain for: "writing well crafted songs as universal anthems, so listeners can hear themselves within these tales." Erlewine further commented that: "The album had big, polished, multipurpose hooks and big, sweeping emotions. This is Super-Size pop, as outsized and grandiose as good pop should be", he concluded. Matthew Bjorke from About.com rated it four-stars out of five and said that: "This 19 track opus is sure to please most fans of both pop and modern country." The Blender review was also positive, saying that: "Twain's songs are never deep, but they have hooks tattooed on their skin and harmonies that glow like bar lights." Also with a positive review, Billboard said that: "[It's] quintessential Shania, light as vapor, sweet as sugar, rendered with personality and undeniable charisma. Expect precious metal." Andrew Lynch from Entertainment.ie rated it three-stars out of five and said that: "The songs, themselves, meanwhile, are as bland and one-dimensional as they were on the smash hit Come on Over, sassily upbeat stuff with a dash of girl power thrown in for good measure. A high proportion of them, however, are also infuriatingly catchy – suggesting that Twain may well have another global success on her hands."

Chris Willman from Entertainment Weekly was largely positive with the album, gaving an "A" grade for the album, comparing the album to "ABBA's Gold without all the melancholy." He also complemented "the sheer exuberance and joy of craftsmanship in this double-Up!-manship don't feel like mercenary insincerity. They resemble something like actual generosity... not to put too fine a point on it." The PopMatters review was average, giving it six stars out of ten and saying that the album "got everything from dance numbers to ballads, and it's vintage Shania". The review further said that: "Up! is a sense of Twain trying – desperately trying at all levels – to touch everyone, to express universal truths by artificial means: beats, tempos, instruments, etc." The review concluded that: "Up! is too generic and emotionless for that level of diversity, but in a very real sense, Twain has taken country music to its next level of popularity where country and pop are virtually indistinguishable." Robert Christgau on his Consumer Guide Review praised the tracks "I'm Gonna Getcha Good! " and "Ka-Ching!". The Rolling Stone review was positive, rating it four-stars out of five and saying that: "Up! would be a knockout even if it were limited to its one disc of country music.... But the second, relentlessly kinetic pop disc is a revelation." Jennifer Nine from Yahoo! Music rated it six-stars out of ten, saying that: "'Up!' is not without its little oddities and delights." And concluded that: "'Up!' takes on its all-things-to-all-wallets mission with real appetite." Alanna Nash from Amazon was largely positive and concluded that: "There's something oddly hypnotic about much of this project, and it may be simply hearing what Shania can do when she abandons the pretense of being a country singer and concentrates on music. Call this a guilty pleasure—pop, country, or somewhere in between."

== Commercial performance ==
Up! debuted at No. 1 on both the Billboard Top Country Albums chart and the all-genre Billboard 200, selling 874,000 copies in its first week of release. In its second week, it remained at the top spot on both charts, selling 623,000 copies. In its third week, sales were still strong enough to top both charts again, selling more than 317,000 copies and beating Tim McGraw's Tim McGraw and the Dancehall Doctors, which held the No. 2 spot for a second consecutive week. The album remained at No. 1 after its fourth week of release, selling more than 373,000 copies. Its last reign on the all-genre chart was after its fifth week. The album's six-week total alone stands at an estimated 2,909,000 sales and was the ninth best selling album of 2002. The RIAA certified the album 11× platinum (Diamond), denoting shipments of 5.5 million in the United States; the RIAA counts each disc separately for certification purposes. It stayed in the Top 200 of the Billboard top 200 albums sales chart for 93 weeks. In Canada, the album debuted at number one on the Canadian Albums Chart, with first-week sales of 150,000 copies. Up! was also the best selling album in Canada for the year 2002 selling 580,690 in six weeks according to SoundScan. The album was certified diamond in Canada 17 days after its release.

== Track listing ==
All songs are written by Shania Twain and Robert John "Mutt" Lange. Track lengths correspond to the red, green, and blue disc versions, respectively.

No.	Title	Length
1.	"Up!"	2:53/2:53/3:14
2.	"I'm Gonna Getcha Good!"	4:29/4:29/4:34
3.	"She's Not Just a Pretty Face"	3:49/3:49/3:40
4.	"Juanita"	3:51/3:50/3:51
5.	"Forever and for Always"	4:43/4:43/4:52
6.	"Ain't No Particular Way"	4:25/4:25/4:27
7.	"It Only Hurts When I'm Breathing"	3:19/3:20/3:32
8.	"Nah!"	4:09/4:14/4:05
9.	"(Wanna Get to Know You) That Good!"	4:34/4:31/4:28
10.	"C'est la vie"	3:43/3:39/3:36
11.	"I'm Jealous"	4:05/3:59/4:10
12.	"Ka-Ching!"	3:21/3:20/3:33
13.	"Thank You Baby! (For Makin' Someday Come So Soon)"	4:01/4:01/4:01
14.	"Waiter! Bring Me Water!"	3:20/3:20/3:37
15.	"What a Way to Wanna Be!"	3:36/3:33/3:33
16.	"I Ain't Goin' Down"	3:58/3:45/3:43
17.	"I'm Not in the Mood (To Say No)!"	3:26/3:26/3:23
18.	"In My Car (I'll Be the Driver)"	3:17/3:15/3:11
19.	"When You Kiss Me"	4:09/4:07/3:56
Total length:		73:08/72:55/73:26

== Singles chronology ==
=== United States ===
1. "I'm Gonna Getcha Good!"
2. "Up!"
3. "Forever and for Always"
4. "She's Not Just a Pretty Face"
5. "It Only Hurts When I'm Breathing"
6. "When You Kiss Me"

=== Europe ===
1. "I'm Gonna Getcha Good!"
2. "Ka-Ching!"
3. "Forever And For Always"
4. "Thank You Baby! (For Makin' Someday Come So Soon)
5. "When You Kiss Me"
6. "Up!"

=== United Kingdom ===
1. "I'm Gonna Getcha Good!"
2. "Ka-Ching!"
3. "Forever and for Always"
4. "Thank You Baby! (For Makin' Someday Come So Soon)"
5. "When You Kiss Me / Up!" (Double A side)

== Personnel ==
- Rakesh Chaurasia – flute
- Cory Churko – slide guitar, soloist
- Kevin Churko – programming
- Sunil Das – sitar
- Diamond Duggal – bouzouki, coral sitar, bass guitar, synthesizer guitar, keyboards, mandolin, percussion
- Simon Duggal – bass guitar, darbouka, dholak, drum programming, keyboards, percussion, tabla
- Paul Franklin – pedal steel guitar
- Gavin Greenaway – string arrangements
- The Irish Film Orchestra – strings
- Robert John "Mutt" Lange – background vocals
- Paul Leim – drums
- Brent Mason – electric guitar
- Mauro Pagini – background vocals
- Chintoo Singh – rabab
- Jatinder Thakur – violin
- Michael Thompson – electric guitar, slide guitar
- Shania Twain – lead vocals, background vocals
- Sanjay Vyas – tabla
- John Willis – banjo, bouzouki, acoustic guitar, mandolin
- Jonathan Yudkin – cello, mandolin, violin

== Charts ==
=== Weekly charts ===
Chart (2002–04)	Peak position
Argentine Albums (CAPIF)	13
Australian Albums (ARIA)	1
Austrian Albums (Ö3 Austria)	2
Belgian Albums (Ultratop Flanders)	5
Belgian Albums (Ultratop Wallonia)	9
Canadian Albums (Billboard)	1
Danish Albums (Hitlisten)	5
Dutch Albums (Album Top 100)	8
European Albums (Top 100)	3
Finnish Albums (Suomen virallinen lista)	20
French Albums (SNEP)	5
German Albums (Offizielle Top 100)	1
Hungarian Albums (MAHASZ)	13
Irish Albums (IRMA)	3
Italian Albums (FIMI)	42
Japanese Albums (Oricon)	14
New Zealand Albums (RMNZ)	1
Norwegian Albums (VG-lista)	2
Portuguese Albums (AFP)	8
Quebec (ADISQ)	1
Scottish Albums (Official Charts)	3
Slovak Albums (SNS IFPI)	19
Spanish Albums (PROMUSICAE)	25
Swedish Albums (Sverigetopplistan)	8
Swiss Albums (Schweizer Hitparade)	2
UK Albums (Official Charts)	4
UK Country Albums (Official Charts)	1
US Billboard 200	1
US Top Country Albums (Billboard)	1

==== Up! (Country Mixes) ====
Chart (2002)	Peak position
US Billboard 200	190
US Top Country Albums (Billboard)	23

==== All-time charts ====
All-time chart performance for Up!
Chart	Position
Canadian Artists Albums (SoundScan)	3
United Kingdom (2000–2019 Female Albums)	96

=== Year-end charts ===
Year-end chart performance for Up!
Chart (2002)	Position
Australian Albums (ARIA)	74
Belgian Albums (Ultratop Flanders)	76
Canadian Albums (Nielsen SoundScan)	1
Canadian Country Albums (Nielsen SoundScan)	1
Danish Albums (Hitlisten)	59
Dutch Albums (MegaCharts)	78
French Albums (SNEP)	48
Norwegian Christmas Period Albums (VG-lista)	6
Swedish Albums (Sverigetopplistan)	71
Swiss Albums (Schweizer Hitparade)	43
UK Albums (OCC)	37
Worldwide Albums (IFPI)	4
Chart (2003)	Position
Australian Albums (ARIA)	36
Austrian Albums (Ö3 Austria)	6
Belgian Albums (Ultratop Wallonia)	97
Danish Albums (Hitlisten)	52
Dutch Albums (MegaCharts)	30
French Albums (SNEP)	72
German Albums (Offizielle Top 100)	5
Hungarian Albums (MAHASZ)	54
Swiss Albums (Schweizer Hitparade)	5
UK Albums (OCC)	48
US Billboard 200	3
US Top Country Albums (Billboard)	1
Chart (2004)	Position
Austrian Albums (Ö3 Austria)	28
German Albums (Offizielle Top 100)	42
Norwegian Winter Period Albums (VG-lista)	2
Swiss Albums (Schweizer Hitparade)	94
US Billboard 200	79
US Top Country Albums (Billboard)	13

== Certifications and sales ==
Region	Certification	Certified units/sales
Australia (ARIA)	2× Platinum	140,000^{^}
Austria (IFPI Austria)	Platinum	30,000^{*}
Belgium (BRMA)	Gold	25,000^{*}
Brazil (Pro-Música Brasil)	Platinum	125,000^{*}
Canada (Music Canada)	2× Diamond	2,000,000^{‡} / 1,144,000
Denmark (IFPI Danmark)	Platinum	50,000^{^}
France (SNEP)	Platinum	300,000^{*}
Germany (BVMI)	2× Platinum	600,000^{^}
Japan (RIAJ)	Platinum	200,000^{^}
Netherlands (NVPI)	Gold	40,000^{^}
New Zealand (RMNZ)	3× Platinum	45,000^{^}
Norway (IFPI Norway)	3× Platinum	120,000^{*}
Poland (ZPAV)	Gold	35,000^{*}
Portugal (AFP)	Platinum	40,000^{^}
Spain (Promusicae)	Gold	50,000^{^}
Sweden (GLF)	Platinum	60,000^{^}
Switzerland (IFPI Switzerland)	3× Platinum	120,000^{^}
United Kingdom (BPI)	2× Platinum	791,728
United States (RIAA)	11× Platinum	5,500,000
Summaries
Europe (IFPI)	2× Platinum	2,000,000^{*}
^{*} Sales figures based on certification alone.^{^} Shipments figures based on certification alone.

== See also ==
- List of best-selling albums by women
- List of best-selling albums in Canada
- List of best-selling albums in the United States
