= I'm Holdin' On to Love (To Save My Life) =

2000 single by Shania Twain

Single by Shania Twain

from the album Come On Over
- B-side: "Rock This Country!"
- Released: July 3, 2000
- Recorded: 1997
- Studio: Masterfonics (Nashville, TN)
- Genre: Country pop; pop rock; country rock
- Length: 3:30
- Label: Mercury Nashville
- Songwriters: Robert John "Mutt" Lange; Shania Twain
- Producer: Robert John "Mutt" Lange

Shania Twain singles chronology
"Rock This Country!" (2000)	"I'm Holdin' On to Love (To Save My Life)" (2000)	"I'm Gonna Getcha Good!" (2002)

Audio video
- "I'm Holdin' On to Love (To Save My Life)" on YouTube

"I'm Holdin' On to Love (To Save My Life)" is a song co-written and recorded by Canadian country music singer Shania Twain. It was released as the twelfth and final single from her double-Diamond certified third studio album Come on Over. It was written by Robert John "Mutt" Lange and Twain. The song was originally released to North American country radio stations on July 3, 2000.

With no promotional performances or CD single, the song was still able to reach considerable chart success. The song peaked at number 2 on the Billboard Bubbling Under Hot 100, becoming her second longest running single on the chart after "You Win My Love". It also reached number 17 on the US Hot Country Singles & Tracks and number 4 on the Canadian RPM Country Tracks. It is also the only single from Come On Over to be released without an accompanying music video, staged or live.

"I'm Holdin' On to Love" was performed on the Come On Over Tour, in a medley on the Up! Tour, and on Twain's 2004 NBC special Up! Close and Personal. The song is commonly cited as a "fan favorite" from Twain's career, despite her not performing or mentioning the song in almost two decades.

== Critical reception ==
Billboard magazine reviewed the song favorably, saying "This is one of those little tunes that pushes all the right buttons that Twain and Lange have engaged so successfully before. Look for it to follow its predecessors up the chart."

== Official versions ==
- Original Country Version (3:30)
- International Version (3:30)
- Pop Mix (3:44)
- Live from Dallas (3:27)
- Live from Up! Close and Personal (3:24)

== Chart performance ==
"I'm Holdin' On to Love" debuted on the Billboard Hot Country Singles & Tracks chart the week of July 8, 2000 at number 66. The single spent 21 weeks on the chart and slowly climbed to a peak position of number 17 on November 11, 2000, where it remained for two weeks. "I'm Holdin' On to Love" became the tenth top 20 single from Come On Over, her 16th overall. The song went on to top the Hot Country Recurrents chart for one week. "I'm Holdin' On to Love" was the final single from Come On Over, and peaked three years after the album's debut, which was released on November 4, 1997. The song also reached number two on the Bubbling Under Hot 100 chart on November 4, 2000; combining with the mainline Hot 100, "I'm Holdin' On to Love" reached number 102.

The song debuted at number 74 on the RPM Country Tracks chart the week of July 24, 2000. Just a week before RPM ceased publication in November 2000, "I'm Holdin' On to Love" reached a peak position of number 4 on the Canadian Top Country Tracks; it would become the album's lowest peaking single and only one of two, the other being "Rock This Country!", to miss the top two. The song had the slowest rise to the top ten out of every other Come On Over single, reaching the top ten in its eleventh week on the chart.

== Charts ==
Chart (2000)	Peak position
Canada Country Singles (RPM)	4
US Bubbling Under Hot 100 (Billboard)	2
US Hot Country Songs (Billboard)	17
