= Thank You Baby! (For Makin' Someday Come So Soon) =

2003 single by Shania Twain

Single by Shania Twain

from the album Up!
- B-side: "From This Moment On"; "Forever and for Always"; "Any Man of Mine"; "You're Still the One"
- Released: August 11, 2003
- Studio: Compass Point (Nassau, Bahamas); Officine Meccaniche (Milan, Italy); Windmill Lane (Dublin, Ireland)
- Genre: Pop
- Length: 4:01
- Label: Mercury Nashville
- Songwriters: Robert John "Mutt" Lange; Shania Twain
- Producer: Robert John "Mutt" Lange

Shania Twain singles chronology
"Forever and for Always" (2003)	"Thank You Baby! (For Makin' Someday Come So Soon)" (2003)	"She's Not Just a Pretty Face" (2003)

Music video
- "Thank You Baby! (For Makin' Someday Come So Soon)" on YouTube

"Thank You Baby! (For Makin' Someday Come So Soon)" is a song by Canadian singer Shania Twain. It was released as the fifth single from her fourth studio album Up! on August 11, 2003. It was one of two singles, along with "Ka-Ching!", to be exclusively released to Europe. The song was written by Twain and her then-husband Mutt Lange. It was announced onstage by Twain that "Thank You Baby!" would be the next single from Up! at her Kilkenny concert, her first concert since the Come On Over Tour ended in December 1999.

== Composition ==
"Thank You Baby!" is performed in the key of G♭ major in compound quadruple (12/8) time with a tempo of 114 beats per minute. Twain's vocals span from G♭_{3} to E♭_{5}.

== Critical reception ==
About.com called the song a "nice mid-tempo ballad", while Rolling Stone magazine noted it conveyed "motherly intimacy and an undeniable pop sense".

== Chart performance ==
"Thank You Baby!" debuted at its peak of number 11 in the UK. It entered the chart on September 6, 2003, and remained on the chart for seven weeks. In Scotland, the song peaked at number 10. The song also charted in Austria and Germany. It peaked at number 23 on the Eurochart Hot 100.

== Music video ==
Shania on TV screens in the "Thank You Baby!" video

The music video for "Thank You Baby!" was exclusively released in Europe on July 28, 2003; in the US, it was added to CMT's playlists for the week of October 26, 2003. It is set in an art gallery, with three four-sided TVs stacked on top of each other in the middle of the room. Twain is singing on the TVs (her head on the top screen, her torso in the middle and her legs on the bottom), while the people in the gallery start noticing her and crowd around the TVs to watch. Paintings of an orchestra come to life to play along to the song. The video is available on select CD singles. It was uploaded to YouTube in October 2009.

== Track listings ==
UK CD single - Part 1

1. "Thank You Baby!" (Red) - 4:04
2. "From This Moment On" (Live) - 4:15
3. "Thank You Baby!" (Green) - 4:03
4. "Thank You Baby!" (Almighty Radio Edit) - 3:09

UK CD singles - Part 2

1. "Thank You Baby!" (Red) - 4:04
2. "Thank You Baby!" (Almighty Mix) - 6:34
3. "Any Man of Mine" (Live) - 4:09
4. Enhanced: "Thank You Baby!" music video

Europe CD Maxi - Part 1

1. "Thank You Baby!" (Red) - 4:03
2. "Forever and for Always" (Red) - 4:46
3. "Any Man of Mine" (Live) - 4:20
4. "You're Still the One" (Live) - 3:26

Europe CD Maxi - Part 2

1. "Thank You Baby!" (Red) - 4:03
2. "Thank You Baby!" (Almighty Mix) - 6:35
3. "Thank You Baby!" (Green) - 4:04
4. Enhanced: "Thank You Baby!" music video

Germany 3" CD single

1. "Thank You Baby!" (Red) - 4:01
2. "Forever and for Always" (Red) - 4:44

Europe and France CD single

1. "Thank You Baby!" (Red) - 4:01
2. "Thank You Baby!" (Almighty Mix) - 6:30

== Charts ==
Weekly chart performance for "Thank You Baby! (For Makin' Someday Come So Soon)"
Chart (2003–2004)	Peak position
Austria (Ö3 Austria Top 40)	17
Europe (Eurochart Hot 100)	23
France (SNEP)	72
Germany (GfK)	20
Ireland (IRMA)	23
Romania (Romanian Top 100)	53
Netherlands (Single Top 100)	48
Scotland Singles (Official Charts)	10
Switzerland (Schweizer Hitparade)	35
UK Singles (Official Charts)	11

== Release history ==
Release dates and formats for "Thank You Baby! (For Makin' Someday Come So Soon)"
Region	Date	Format(s)	Label(s)	Ref.
Germany	August 11, 2003	CD	Mercury	
United Kingdom	August 25, 2003	CD; cassette	Mercury	
