= Ka-Ching! =

2003 single by Shania Twain

Single by Shania Twain

from the album Up!
- Released: February 17, 2003
- Studio: Compass Point (Nassau, Bahamas); Officine Meccaniche (Milan, Italy); Windmill Lane (Dublin, Ireland)
- Length: 3:22
- Label: Mercury Nashville
- Songwriters: Robert John "Mutt" Lange; Shania Twain
- Producer: Robert John "Mutt" Lange

Shania Twain singles chronology
"Up!" (2003)	"Ka-Ching!" (2003)	"Forever and for Always" (2003)

Music videos
- "Ka-Ching!" (Red version) on YouTube; "Ka-Ching!" (Red Dress version) on YouTube; "Ka-Ching!" (Guitar version) on YouTube

"Ka-Ching!" is a song recorded by Canadian singer Shania Twain. It was released on February 17, 2003, as the second single to her fourth studio album Up! (2002), exclusively to Europe and Central America. The song was written by Twain and Robert John "Mutt" Lange. "Ka-Ching!" lyrically centers on greed and consumer culture, a topic Twain had never sung about before.

"Ka-Ching!" became one of Twain's most successful singles in Europe to date, reaching the top ten in six European countries and topping the Portuguese music charts, which lead to the song peaking at number two on the European Hot 100 Singles, becoming her highest peaking single on the chart. Twain performed the song on the Up! Tour, while an interlude of the song was performed on her Rock This Country Tour and the European dates of Now Tour.

== Background and composition ==
The song was written by Robert Lange and Shania Twain. Lyrically, the song deals with what it considers to be the greed in the world. The tongue-in-cheek lyrics look at how our world revolves around money. It features an opening similar to Pink Floyd's "Money". According to Jennifer Nine from Yahoo! Music, "it's essentially Radiohead's "squealing Gucci little piggies" served up for those without Oxford educations and Naomi Klein's Guardian columns: "We spend the money that we don't possess/Our religion is to go and blow it all". The song was, ironically enough, originally written for a planned Christmas album that was meant to be released in 1999 but that project was delayed and eventually shelved.

== Lyrics and themes ==
"Ka-Ching" centers on consumerism. Opening with sound of a cash register ringing, Twain then sings that the world teaches children to want and want and want ("we live in a greedy, little world/that teaches every little boy and girl/to earn as much as they can possibly/then turn around and spend it foolishly") and that the adults do not know how to spend their money wisely, either ("we've created us a credit card mess/we spend the money that we don't possess"). And as soon as the money is there, people will go to the new churches — the malls ("Our religion is to go and blow it all/so it's shoppin' every Sunday at the mall"). In the chorus, Twain sings the satisfaction and fulfillment people find in buying and having more money and things ("Can you hear it ring/it makes you wanna sing/it's such a beautiful thing -- Ka-ching!").

In the second verse, she sings that the shallow, materialistic people are irresponsible and will go to drastic lengths, including risking foreclosure on their home to buy more stuff ("when you're broke go and get a loan/take out another mortgage on your home/consolidate so you can afford/to go and spend some more when you get bored"). She taunts them in the bridge ("Dig deeper in your pocket/Oh yeah/Come on, I know you've got it/Dig deeper in your wallet").

== Critical reception ==
The song received mostly positive reviews from most music critics. S. Renee Dechert from PopMatters wrote that the song "stands out as different against the others." Jennifer Nine from Yahoo! Music commented that "musically, its Timbaland-style strings and off-kilter chorus are the best thing on the album." Jake Taylor from Sputnikmusic agreed, writing that the song is "one of the more triumphant moments of the album." Robert Christgau picked the song as one of the best tracks on the album. Lachlan Sutherland from "UK Mix" wrote: "The song is a definite stand out track, with incredibly witty lyrics. It's very fresh and invigorating!." "Traveling to the Heart" wrote a very positive review, stating: "Twain's delivery matter-of-fact and matches the biting tone. With this gem, she proves that she is capable of writing music with some substance to it. Unlike her previous hits, 'Ka-Ching!' is against type. Pop music is being about glamorous, into high-fashion, and living in mansions. However, Twain sees the emptiness of it all and sings about something different for once." Country Universe's Kevin John Coyne praised the song as "channeling all that is best about ABBA without sounding dated."

== Chart performance ==
"Ka-Ching!" has become one of Twain's biggest singles in Europe. In the UK, it became her sixth consecutive, seventh overall, top ten single. It debuted on March 22, 2003, at its peak at number eight. It remained on the entire chart for eight weeks. In all, "Ka-Ching!" hit the top ten in seven countries: Austria, Germany, Hungary, Romania, Switzerland, Portugal (where it reached the top spot) and the UK. It became her highest charting single in Germany, Austria, Switzerland and Hungary where it spent 62 weeks in the top 40.

== Music video ==
Shania in the music video to "Ka-Ching!"

The music video for "Ka-Ching!" was shot in the Casino Español and in a hotel in Mexico City, Mexico, and Madrid, Spain, in January 2003. It was directed by Finnish director Antti J, who also shot her video for "Up!" around the same time. The video debuted in Europe and Central and South America on February 25, 2003. It was not released to North American stations. The video depicts a city consumed with greed; Twain finds the streets empty and cars left abandoned while everyone is in a casino, sticking with the theme of the song. Scenes of Twain at a photoshoot sporting a red dress with lots of jewellery, and on a stage decorated with guitars in an outfit printed with newspaper articles, are intercut throughout the video. Both outfits are by Marc Bouwer. These scenes are the base of two further versions of the video that lack the narrative and only show Twain performing either in the red dress, or in the newspaper outfit. "Ka-Ching!" was released on YouTube in mid-2011.

== Uses in media ==
"Ka-Ching!" appears in the Oxford University Press' New English File: Intermediate Student's Book, an ESL book.

== Track listings ==
These are the formats and track listings of major single releases of "Ka-Ching!".

- CD maxi - Europe
1. "Ka-Ching!" (Red) — 3:20
2. "Ka-Ching!" (Sowatt Hip Hop Mix) — 3:22
3. "Ka-Ching!" (Sowatt Extended Lounge Mix) — 9:09
4. "I'm Gonna Getcha Good!" (Sowatt Dance Mix) — 4:32
- CD single - UK - Part 1
1. "Ka-Ching!" (Red Version) — 3:20
2. "Ka-Ching!" (the Simon & Diamond Bhangra Version) — 4:36
3. "I'm Holding on to Love (to Save My Life)" (Live) — 3:27
- CD single - UK - Part 2
1. "Ka-Ching!
2. "You're Still The One"
3. Enhanced: "I'm Gonna Getcha Good!" - Music Video
- CD single - France
1. "Ka-Ching!" (Red) — 3:20
2. "I'm Gonna Getcha Good!" (Sowatt Extended Dance Mix) — 7:57
- CD maxi - France
1. "Ka-Ching!" (Red Version) — 3:20
2. "You're Still the One" (Live) — 3:21
3. "I'm Holding on to Love (to Save My Life)" (Live) — 3:30
4. "Ka-Ching!" (the Simon & Diamond Bhangra Mix) — 4:36

== Charts ==
=== Weekly charts ===
Weekly chart performance for "Ka-Ching!"
Chart (2003)	Peak position
Austria (Ö3 Austria Top 40)	2
Belgium (Ultratip Bubbling Under Flanders)	6
Belgium (Ultratop 50 Wallonia)	31
Denmark Airplay (Tracklisten)	17
Europe (Eurochart Hot 100)	2
Europe (European Radio Top 50)	7
France (SNEP)	15
France Airplay (SNEP)	9
Germany (GfK)	3
Hungary (Rádiós Top 40)	2
Hungary Airplay (Music & Media)	4
Ireland (IRMA)	27
Italy (FIMI)	38
Netherlands (Dutch Top 40)	15
Netherlands (Single Top 100)	11
Norway (VG-lista)	15
Poland (PiF PaF)	3
Portugal (AFP)	1
Romania (Romanian Top 100)	2
Scottish Singles Sales (Official Charts)	8
Spain (Radio Top 40)	18
Sweden (Sverigetopplistan)	17
Switzerland (Schweizer Hitparade)	2
UK Singles (Official Charts)	8

=== Year-end charts ===
2003 year-end chart performance for "Ka-Ching!"
Chart (2003)	Position
Austria (Ö3 Austria Top 40)	14
France (SNEP)	95
Germany (Media Control GfK)	20
Netherlands (Dutch Top 40)	92
Netherlands (Single Top 100)	69
Romania (Romanian Top 100)	27
Sweden (Hitlistan)	75
Switzerland (Schweizer Hitparade)	17
UK Singles (OCC)	133

2004 year-end chart performance for "Ka-Ching!"
Chart (2004)	Position
Hungary (Rádiós Top 40)	17

== Certifications and sales ==
Certifications for "Ka-Ching!"
Region	Certification	Certified units/sales
Austria (IFPI Austria)	Gold	15,000^{*}
Germany (BVMI)	Gold	150,000^{^}
United Kingdom	—	71,264
^{*} Sales figures based on certification alone.^{^} Shipments figures based on certification alone.

== Release history ==
Release dates and formats for "Ka-Ching!"
Region	Date	Format(s)	Label	Ref.
Germany	February 17, 2003	Maxi single	Universal	
Germany	February 26, 2003	CD single	Universal	
United Kingdom	March 10, 2003	CD single; cassette single	Universal	
