= Forever and for Always =

2003 single by Shania Twain

- Alternate UK and European cover, Australian single cover

Single by Shania Twain

from the album Up!
- B-side: "Nah!"
- Released: April 7, 2003
- Studio: Compass Point (Nassau, Bahamas); Officine Meccaniche (Milan, Italy); Windmill Lane (Dublin, Ireland)
- Genre: Country pop
- Length: 4:04
- Label: Mercury Nashville
- Songwriters: Robert John "Mutt" Lange; Shania Twain
- Producer: Robert John "Mutt" Lange

Shania Twain singles chronology
"Ka-Ching!" (2003)	"Forever and for Always" (2003)	"Thank You Baby! (For Makin' Someday Come So Soon)" (2003)

Music videos
- "Forever and for Always" (Green version) on YouTube; "Forever and for Always" (Red version) on YouTube

"Forever and for Always" is a song by Canadian country music singer Shania Twain. The song was released as the fourth single from her fourth studio album, Up! (2002), on April 7, 2003; it was also the third to be sent to country radio. The song was written by her then-husband Robert John "Mutt" Lange and Twain. The song is about two people who fall in love as children and are still with each other even as they grow older. "Forever and for Always" was certified platinum by the Recording Industry Association of America (RIAA) for exceeding one million sales and streaming units.

The song received positive reviews, with some reviewers comparing it to her 1998 single "You're Still the One". The song was the best performing single from Up! on country radio, peaking at number four on the Hot Country Singles & Tracks chart, and was also a number-one hit on the Adult Contemporary chart. The song peaked within the top ten in six countries and peaked at number twenty on the Billboard Hot 100. "Forever and for Always" was later nominated at the 46th Annual Grammy Awards for Best Country Song and Best Female Country Vocal Performance.

The music video for "Forever and for Always" premiered on April 26, 2003, to Country Music Television, which portrayed a couple throughout their life as children, teens, and elders. The video later won the 2004 CMT Flameworthy Video Awards for Female Video of the Year. Twain performed the song on the Up! Tour, her Let's Go! residency, Queen of Me Tour, and her Come On Over residency, while elements of the song were include in a video interlude for "The Woman in Me (Needs the Man in You)" on the Now Tour. The song was later named Song of the Year at both the 2004 BMI Country Songwriter Awards and 2004 European BMI Awards.

== Background ==
Twain said there is something inspirational to her about people who start relationships when they are kids, and are still in love when they are older. Twain really enjoyed doing the video for the song, because she was able to realize that visually. She said it is one of her favorite songs.

In December 2019, during the Let's Go! residency in Las Vegas, Twain revealed for the first time that the song had been recorded by her friend Prince, but that his version was never released and instead remained part of his private collection. The performance was Twain's first of "Forever And For Always" in over 15 years and was dedicated to the late singer.

== Composition ==
"Forever and for Always" is performed in the key of G♭ major in 2/2 time following a chord progression of G♭–G♭2–C♭–D♭, and Twain's vocals span from G♭_{3} to E♭_{5}. The song moves at a tempo of 86 beats per minute.

== Music video ==
The music video for "Forever and for Always" was shot at Bethells Beach in New Zealand in March 2003. It was directed by Paul Boyd, who shot her "When You Kiss Me" video around the same time also in New Zealand. It debuted on Country Music Television (CMT) on April 26, 2003. The video shows two children at the beach together, then it shows them as teens, and eventually seniors, visualizing the theme of the song of staying together forever. Scenes of Twain at the beach are intercut throughout the video. The video was released with both the 'red' and 'green' versions, with each also having an 'all performance' video of only Twain at the beach. The video released a 'blue' version internationally as well. The video won the Female Video of the Year Award at the 2004 CMT Flameworthy Awards, and was nominated for Video of the Year at the 2003 Canadian Country Music Awards, but lost to another song by Twain, "I'm Gonna Getcha Good!". The video is available on select singles, and the DVD-Audio version of Up!.

== Critical reception ==
Billboard magazine contrasted the song against the previous two singles, saying it "relies less on cutesy gimmicks (and exclamation marks) and focuses thematically on steadfast love," while comparing it to Shania's earlier singles "From This Moment On" and "You're Still the One". About.com ranked the song 95th for the top 100 pop songs of 2003.

== Chart performance ==
"Forever and for Always" debuted on the US Billboard Hot Country Singles & Tracks chart the week of April 12, 2003, at number 60, one of Twain's lowest debuts for a single. It quickly rose up the chart and was a notable hit in a male-dominated year for the genre. Notably for the week of July 5, 2003, Billboard magazine noted that "Forever and for Always" was the only single by a female artist in the top ten of the Hot Country Singles & Tracks chart that week. She was compared to peers such as Faith Hill and LeAnn Rimes in that they tried to do a crossover to pop music only to be met with mediocre success from both pop and country audiences. The single peaked at number four on the chart for the week of September 6, 2003, where it stayed for one week, becoming the highest peaking single from Up! on the country charts. It stayed 26 total weeks on the chart, one of Twain's longest running singles on the chart and became her 14th top ten single.

On the adult contemporary chart, "Forever and for Always" debuted at number 30 the week of May 10, 2003. The single spent 77 weeks on the chart and slowly climbed to a peak position of number one on November 15, 2003, where it remained for six non-consecutive weeks. "Forever and for Always" became Twain's third number one, sixth top-10 single and seventh consecutive top-20 single.

"Forever and for Always" debuted on the Billboard Hot 100 on May 24, 2003, at number 75. It spent 23 weeks on the chart and peaked at number 20 on September 6, 2003, becoming Twain's fourth-most-successful single on the chart. The single reached number 17 on the airplay chart. "Forever and for Always" became Twain's fourth top-20 single and ninth top-40 single.

"Forever and for Always" proved to be successful internationally, becoming Twain's fifth biggest single in the UK. It debuted on June 14, 2003, at its peak at number six. This made it her seventh consecutive, eighth overall, top-10 single. It remained on the entire chart for 10 weeks. In all, "Forever and for Always" hit the top-10 in six countries: Austria, Canada, Germany, Ireland, Romania, and the UK.

== Track listings ==
UK CD single part 1

1. "Forever and for Always" (edit) – 4:10
2. "Man! I Feel Like a Woman!" (live) – 3:58
3. "Don't Be Stupid" (live) – 3:58
4. Enhanced: "Forever and for Always" (video)

UK CD single part 2

1. "Forever and for Always" (edit) – 4:10
2. "That Don't Impress Me Much" (live) – 3:47
3. "Come On Over" (live) – 3:00
4. Enhanced: "Forever and for Always" (original red version—music video)

Australia maxi-CD

1. "Forever and for Always" (red) – 4:05
2. "Forever and for Always" (green) – 4:44
3. "Man! I Feel Like a Woman!" (live) – 3:56
4. "That Don't Impress Me Much" (live) – 3:45
5. "Come On Over" (live) – 3:00

European and Canadian CD single

1. "Forever and for Always" (red) – 4:08
2. "That Don't Impress Me Much" (live) – 3:54

German 3-inch CD single

1. "Forever and for Always" (red) – 4:08
2. "Ka-Ching!" (red album version) – 3:20

European CD single

1. "Forever and for Always" (red) – 4:09
2. "Ka-Ching!" (red) – 3:21
3. "That Don't Impress Me Much" (live) – 3:46
4. "Come On Over" (live) – 3:01

European CD single

1. "Forever and for Always" (red) – 4:08
2. "Man! I Feel Like a Woman!" (live) – 3:56
3. "Don't Be Stupid" (live) – 3:58
4. Enhanced: "Forever and for Always" (video)

== Charts ==
=== Weekly charts ===
Weekly chart performance for "Forever and for Always"
Chart (2003–2004)	Peak position
Australia (ARIA)	45
Austria (Ö3 Austria Top 40)	6
Belgium (Ultratip Bubbling Under Wallonia)	14
Canada (Nielsen SoundScan)	5
Europe (Eurochart Hot 100)	17
Germany (GfK)	9
Hungary (Rádiós Top 40)	37
Ireland (IRMA)	6
Netherlands (Single Top 100)	44
New Zealand (Recorded Music NZ)	17
Poland (PiF PaF)	27
Romania (Romanian Top 100)	8
Scotland Singles (Official Charts)	4
Switzerland (Schweizer Hitparade)	26
UK Singles (Official Charts)	6
US Billboard Hot 100	20
US Adult Contemporary (Billboard)	1
US Adult Pop Airplay (Billboard)	30
US Hot Country Songs (Billboard)	4

=== Year-end charts ===
2003 year-end chart performance for "Forever and for Always"
Chart (2003)	Position
Austria (Ö3 Austria Top 40)	36
Germany (Media Control GfK)	42
Ireland (IRMA)	28
Romania (Romanian Top 100)	90
UK Singles (OCC)	140
US Billboard Hot 100	57
US Adult Contemporary (Billboard)	10
US Adult Top 40 (Billboard)	90
US Hot Country Singles & Tracks (Billboard)	14

2004 year-end chart performance for "Forever and for Always"
Chart (2004)	Position
US Adult Contemporary (Billboard)	5

=== Decade-end charts ===
Decade-end chart performance for "Forever and for Always"
Chart (2000–2009)	Position
US Adult Contemporary (Billboard)	10

=== All-time charts ===
All-time chart performance for "Forever and for Always"
Chart (1961–2011)	Position
US Adult Contemporary (Billboard)	76

== Certifications ==
Certifications for "Forever and for Always"
Region	Certification	Certified units/sales
New Zealand (RMNZ)	Gold	15,000^{‡}
United Kingdom	—	91,410
United States (RIAA)	Platinum	1,000,000^{‡}
^{‡} Sales+streaming figures based on certification alone.

== Release history ==
Release dates and formats for "Forever and for Always"
Region	Date	Format(s)	Label	Ref.
United States	April 7, 2003	Country radio	Mercury	
United States	April 14, 2003	Adult contemporary radio	Mercury	
United States	April 21, 2003	Adult contemporary radio	Mercury	
United Kingdom	June 2, 2003	CD single; cassette single	Mercury	
Canada	June 24, 2003	CD	Mercury	
Australia	July 7, 2003	CD single	Mercury	
United States	August 4, 2003	Contemporary hit radio	Mercury	

== See also ==
- List of Billboard Adult Contemporary number ones of 2003 and 2004 (U.S.)
