= I'm Gonna Getcha Good! =

2002 single by Shania Twain

Single by Shania Twain

from the album Up!
- B-side: "In My Car (I'll Be the Driver)"; "C'est la Vie"
- Released: October 7, 2002
- Studio: Compass Point (Nassau, Bahamas); Officine Meccaniche (Milan, Italy); Windmill Lane (Dublin, Ireland)
- Genre: Country pop; dance pop; electropop
- Length: 4:02
- Label: Mercury Nashville
- Songwriters: Robert John "Mutt" Lange; Shania Twain
- Producer: Robert John "Mutt" Lange

Shania Twain singles chronology
"I'm Holdin' On to Love (To Save My Life)" (2000)	"I'm Gonna Getcha Good!" (2002)	"Up!" (2003)

Music videos
- "I'm Gonna Getcha Good!" (Green version) on YouTube; "I'm Gonna Getcha Good!" (Red version) on YouTube; "I'm Gonna Getcha Good!" (Performance version) on YouTube

"I'm Gonna Getcha Good!" is a song by the Canadian recording artist Shania Twain, released as the lead single from her fourth studio album, Up! (2002). This song was written by Twain and her then-husband Robert John "Mutt" Lange, who also produced this track. The country pop song was released by Mercury Nashville Records on October 7, 2002, to country radio, as the lead single to the Up! album. The "Green" country version was released in the United States and Australia while in the rest of the world, the "Red" pop version was released instead. To promote the single, Twain performed on a multitude of shows, including Top of the Pops, Wetten, dass..?, The Early Show, and the 2002 CMA Awards.

Critics responded to "I'm Gonna Getcha Good!" positively, although it was seen as derivative of Twain's previous work. As her first single release in over two years, the track immediately garnered success. It debuted at number 24 on the US Billboard Hot Country Songs chart on October 19, 2002, which was at the time the highest debut ever on the chart by a female artist; it peaked at number seven. Internationally, the track received more success, topping the charts in Twain's native Canada and Romania, and reaching the top five in Norway, Poland, and the United Kingdom, where in the latter country has gone on to be certified Silver by the British Phonographic Industry. A music video, shot by Paul Boyd, was released which featured Twain being chased around by a robot in a dystopian town; it received the Concept Video of the Year award at the 2003 CMT Flameworthy Awards and Best Video of the Year award at the 2003 Canadian CMA Awards.

== Background ==
"I'm Gonna Getcha Good!" was originally released to country radio in the United States on October 7, 2002. Twain chose "I'm Gonna Getcha Good!" as the first single for Up! since she thought it was relatable to her previous singles, and she did not want something too unfamiliar. There are three main versions of the song - the "Green" version and the "Red" version, which represented the country and pop mixes of the song respectively, and the "Blue" version, which featured additional production by producers Simon & Diamond Duggal in the style of Indian film music.

American boy band Jonas Brothers covered the song nightly during their 2008 Burning Up Tour and included their cover for the soundtrack of their 2009 concert film Jonas Brothers: The 3D Concert Experience.

== Composition ==
According to sheet music provided by Universal Music Publishing Group on Musicnotes.com, "I'm Gonna Getcha Good!" is performed in the key of C major, with a fast tempo of 123 beats per minute; Twain's vocals range from G_{3}–A_{4}.

== Promotion ==
Since "I'm Gonna Getcha Good!" was the lead single from a brand-new album and Twain had been out of the public eye for a while, she performed the song all over the world to promote the album (as well as the single) and get herself back into the public eye. Sexually suggestive images were used to brand the single and promotion started in Europe, where in Germany she performed on Wetten, dass..?, in the UK she performed at BBC, Royal Variety Show, CD:UK, and Top of the Pops. In Sweden she performed the single on Bingolotto and in Portugal she performed on the Herman SIC Show. In Italy she performed at the Festival della canzone italiana. Following promotion in Europe she headed to Japan where she performed at the Japan Music Festival. In November 2002, she headed to North America, where she performed the song for the first time at the 2002 CMA Awards on November 6, her first network performance since 1999 in the region. In New York the song was performed on The Late Show on the album release day (November 19) and The Today Show. In Canada, Twain headlined the Grey Cup half time show from Edmonton, and performed "I'm Gonna Getcha Good!" and "Up!" on November 24. On January 13, 2003, Twain performed the single at the 30th American Music Awards, in a medley with "Up!". Also in 2003, Twain performed the song on the Early Show and Vh1 Big in '03 and added it to the set-list of her Up! Live in Chicago concert.

== Critical reception and accolades ==
Reception to "I'm Gonna Getcha Good!" was mostly positive, though many reviews compared the song to earlier singles. Billboard called the single "one catchy little puppy," though stated the song is "more a reminder of where we've been than where she's planning to take us". About.com called the song "pure ear candy from beginning to end". Entertainment Weekly gave the song a C+ grade and found Shania "softening every edge with skillful vixen-next-door charm". Country Universe's Ben Foster retrospectively reviewed it positively, naming it as a "prime example of classic Twain-Lange song structure at its top-notch best" and "Lange's crisp, tasteful production brilliantly underscores the catchy melody, while Twain sells the cheeky lyric with sass and swagger." Smooth Radio placed the song at number 7 in their ranking of Twain's ten best songs. Jeff Gage of Rolling Stone magazine ranked it at number 19 on their list of Twain's 20 best songs, comparing her vocal delivery to Debbie Harry on Blondie's "One Way or Another". Singersroom ranked the song at number four on their list of Twain's ten best songs of all time.

At the 2003 Juno Awards, "I'm Gonna Getcha Good!" was named Country Recording of the Year.

== Chart performance ==
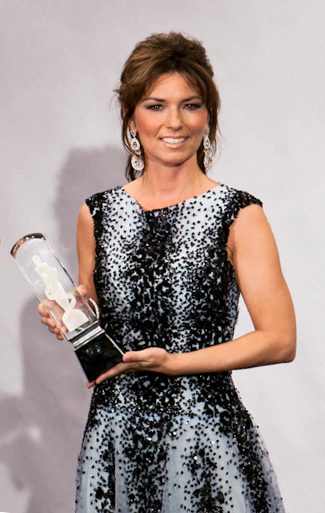
With "I'm Gonna Getcha Good!", Twain (pictured in 2011) held the record for the highest debut by a female artist on the country songs chart until 2005.

"I'm Gonna Getcha Good!" debuted on the US Billboard Hot Country Singles & Tracks chart, known now as Hot Country Songs, on the week of October 19, 2002, at number 24, setting a new record for the highest debut by a female artist on the chart; Twain's record was kept until 2005, when Gretchen Wilson debuted at number 21 on the August 13 issue with "All Jacked Up". On rival magazine Radio & Records's country airplay chart, the track debuted at number 21, which was the second highest debut ever behind Garth Brooks.

== Music video ==
=== Filming and release ===
The music video for "I'm Gonna Getcha Good!" was shot in London, UK and directed by Paul Boyd. The music video was written and created by Visualist Ash Beck. It was filmed on August 22 and 23, 2002, and debuted on CMT's Most Wanted Live on October 4, 2002. A behind the scenes making of the video, Shania in London: Making the Video, premiered on October 11, 2002, to CMT as well. The video was rumored to have costed six million dollars, which would have made it the most expensive music video at the time. In total there are six versions of the "I'm Gonna Getcha Good!" video. The first to be released were the original versions of both the 'Red' and 'Green' radio mixes. These were later replaced by an 'SFX Edit' version for both Red and Green versions which featured more sound effects from the motorcycle and robot. The 'Blue' mix was released solely in India, and an alternative 'Red' version was released featuring only Twain and her band performing in the studio setting to the longer album version, unlike the original video which is shortened to suit the radio edit.

=== Synopsis ===
The video is set in a dystopian futuristic setting, with Twain riding a motorcycle out of a secret location and cruising around the city. She passes what she thinks is a rock sculpture, which then reveals to be a flying robot, who attempts to capture Twain and trap her. She manages to evade being captured by tricking the robot into one of its own traps, and narrowly dodges the explosion. Intercut throughout are scenes of Twain and a band performing in a music video studio setting behind a glass wall. Near the end of the video, she is revealed to be a clone of the actual Twain, who is nearby when she finds the robot's eye and throws it to break the glass. The video ends with the Twain-clone slowly stepping into the outside world.

=== Reception ===
The video was a success, peaking at number one on VH1's weekly countdown. The video won the Best Video of the Year Award at the 2003 Canadian Country Music Awards, beating out another one of Twain's videos, "Forever and for Always". At the 2003 CMT Flameworthy Awards, Twain was nominated for five awards: Video of the Year, Female Video of the Year, Hottest Female Video of the Year, Fashion Plate Video of the Year, and Concept Video of the Year, with "I'm Gonna Getcha Good!" winning the lattermost award. Robin Eggar, writer of the biography Shania Twain: The Biography, noted the video for bringing Twain back into "sex kitten land" and called it an unlikely cross between Tron and Blade Runner. The leather lace bodysuit, designed by Marc Bouwer, has been noted as an iconic outfit for Twain, with Paste and Racked ranking it at numbers 8 and 5 in their lists of her best music video looks. The video itself was ranked by Showbiz Cheat Sheet as her fifth best music video.

The 'Red SFX Edit' version of the video is available on the DVD-Audio version of Up!, while the 'Green' version is available on Twain's budget video compilation A Collection of Video Hits. After the video shoot, Shania donated the "I'm Gonna Getcha Good!" costume to the Shania Twain Centre in her hometown of Timmins, Ontario.

== Track listings ==
- Canadian and European CD single
1. "I'm Gonna Getcha Good!" (red)
2. "C'est la vie" (red)
- UK and Australian CD1
1. "I'm Gonna Getcha Good!" (red) – 4:29
2. "In My Car (I'll Be the Driver)" (red) – 3:17
3. "In My Car (I'll Be the Driver)" (blue) – 3:11
- UK CD2
1. "I'm Gonna Getcha Good!" (red) – 4:29
2. "C'est la vie" (red) – 3:42
3. "C'est la vie" (blue) – 3:36
- UK cassette single
1. "I'm Gonna Getcha Good!" (red) – 4:29
2. "In My Car (I'll Be the Driver)" (blue) – 3:11
- Australian CD2
1. "I'm Gonna Getcha Good!" (green)
2. "C'est la vie" (red)
3. "C'est la vie" (blue)
- Japanese CD single
1. "I'm Gonna Getcha Good!" (red)
2. "C'est la vie" (blue)
3. "In My Car" (red)
4. "In My Car" (blue)

== Charts ==
=== Weekly charts ===
2002–2003 weekly chart performance for "I'm Gonna Getcha Good!"
Chart (2002–2003)	Peak position
Australia (ARIA)	14
Austria (Ö3 Austria Top 40)	12
Belgium (Ultratop 50 Flanders)	25
Belgium (Ultratop 50 Wallonia)	21
Canada (Nielsen SoundScan)	1
Canada Radio (Nielsen BDS)	1
Canada AC (Nielsen BDS)	2
Canada CHR/Top 40 (Nielsen BDS)	6
Canada Country (Nielsen BDS)	3
Czech Republic (IFPI)	12
Denmark (Tracklisten)	6
Europe (Eurochart Hot 100)	4
France (SNEP)	15
Germany (GfK)	15
Hungary (Rádiós Top 40)	6
Hungary (Single Top 40)	12
Ireland (IRMA)	7
Italy (FIMI)	14
Netherlands (Dutch Top 40)	12
Netherlands (Single Top 100)	15
New Zealand (Recorded Music NZ)	4
Norway (VG-lista)	4
Poland (Polish Airplay Charts)	3
Portugal (AFP)	8
Romania (Romanian Top 100)	1
Scottish Singles Sales (Official Charts)	4
Spain (Promusicae)	8
Sweden (Sverigetopplistan)	8
Switzerland (Schweizer Hitparade)	10
UK Singles (Official Charts)	4
US Billboard Hot 100	34
US Adult Contemporary (Billboard)	10
US Adult Pop Airplay (Billboard)	34
US Hot Country Songs (Billboard)	7
US Adult Contemporary (Radio & Records)	9
US Country (Radio & Records)	6
US Hot AC (Radio & Records)	30

2017 weekly chart performance for "I'm Gonna Getcha Good!"
Chart (2017)	Peak position
Uruguay (Monitor Latino)	9

=== Year-end charts ===
2002 year-end chart performance for "I'm Gonna Getcha Good!"
Chart (2002)	Position
Canada (Nielsen SoundScan)	6
France (SNEP)	79
Ireland (IRMA)	63
Netherlands (Dutch Top 40)	122
Romania (Romanian Top 100)	80
Sweden (Hitlistan)	79
UK Singles (OCC)	93
US Hot Country Singles & Tracks (Billboard)	80
US Adult Contemporary (Radio & Records)	95
US Country (Radio & Records)	74

2003 year-end chart performance for "I'm Gonna Getcha Good!"
Chart (2003)	Position
Netherlands (Dutch Top 40)	91
US Adult Contemporary (Billboard)	26
US Hot Country Singles & Tracks (Billboard)	84
US Adult Contemporary (Radio & Records)	34
US Country (Radio & Records)	80

2004 year-end chart performance for "I'm Gonna Getcha Good!"
Chart (2004)	Position
Hungary (Rádiós Top 40)	98

== Certifications and sales ==
Certifications for "I'm Gonna Getcha Good!"
Region	Certification	Certified units/sales
Australia (ARIA)	Gold	35,000^{^}
New Zealand (RMNZ)	Gold	15,000^{‡}
Norway	—	10,000
United Kingdom (BPI)	Silver	200,000^{‡}
United States (RIAA)	Gold	500,000^{‡}
^{^} Shipments figures based on certification alone.^{‡} Sales+streaming figures based on certification alone.

== Release history ==
Release dates and formats for "I'm Gonna Getcha Good!"
Region	Date	Format(s)	Label(s)	Ref(s).
United States	October 7, 2002	Country radio	Mercury	
Australia	November 4, 2002	CD	Mercury	
Germany	November 4, 2002	CD	Mercury	
United Kingdom	November 4, 2002	CD; cassette	Mercury	
United States	November 4, 2002	Adult contemporary radio; contemporary hit radio; hot AC radio	Mercury	
Canada	November 12, 2002	CD	Mercury	
Japan	November 13, 2002	CD	Mercury	

== See also ==
- List of Romanian Top 100 number ones of the 2000s
