= Come On Over - All The Hits =

Shania Twain Third Las Vegas Residency

- Residency by Shania Twain
- Location: Paradise, Nevada, U.S.
- Venue: Bakkt Theater
- Start date: May 10, 2024
- End date: February 8, 2025
- Legs: 4
- No. of shows: 33

Shania Twain concert chronology
- Queen of Me Tour (2023); Come On Over - All The Hits (2024–2025)

Come On Over - All The Hits! was the third concert residency by Canadian singer Shania Twain. Performed at the Bakkt Theater on the Las Vegas Strip in Paradise, Nevada, the residency began on May 10, 2024, and concluded on February 5, 2025.

== Background ==
Prior to the residency, Twain spent three years, from December 2019 until September 2022, performing the Let's Go! (residency) at Zappos Theater, and embarked on her 2023 Queen of Me Tour. In August 2023, Twain announced that she would be returning to Las Vegas, after the end of her Queen of Me Tour in 2023.

"Performing in Vegas is a huge honor and I love this theatre. The audience can expect all the hits with a few fan favorites from the new album in there too." Twain told ABC News (United States).

Pre-sales started on August 16, and general ticketing began on August 21 at 10AM PT. $1 from each ticket was donated to Twain's children-focused charity, Shania Twain Foundation. The show ran at the Bakkt Theater at Planet Hollywood Resort & Casino, and all shows began at 8PM.

On August 14, 2024, Caesars Entertainment rebranded the Bakkt Theater to PH Live.

On August 29, 2024, Boyz II Men joined Twain on stage as a surprise. They performed You're Still The One and I'll Make Love to You.

Shows were initially scheduled through December 2024. However, on September 2, 2024, Twain announced she would be extending the residency, with nine final shows taking place in January and February 2025.

During the show on December 4, 2024, Twain revealed that her duet with Sabrina Carpenter on the Netflix 'A Nonsense Christmas' Special was Santa Baby. The singer and her band proceeded to perform the song additional to the standard setlist.

After the final run of shows in February 2025, Twain announced on her Instagram that her 'Let's Go Girls' T-Shirt proceeds went towards Creative Artists Agency's SoCal Fire Fund.

"I wanted to support the relief efforts against the wildfires in some way. I’m happy to say that we raised $24,577.87 for CAA Foundation SoCal Fire Fund from the proceeds of my Let’s Go Girls T-Shirt on my Vegas merch stand."

== Set list ==
This set list is representative of the show on May 10, 2024. It is not representative of all concerts for the duration of the residency.

1. "Don't Be Stupid (You Know I Love You)"
2. "Love Gets Me Every Time"
3. "You Win My Love"
4. "Waking Up Dreaming"
5. "Up!" (Pop version)
6. "I'm Gonna Getcha Good!"
7. "You're Still The One"
8. "No One Needs to Know"
9. "Forever and for Always"
10. "Come on Over"
11. "Any Man of Mine"
12. "Giddy Up!"
13. "I Ain't No Quitter"
14. "Whose Bed Have Your Boots Been Under?"
15. "Honey, I'm Home"
16. "From This Moment On"
17. "That Don't Impress Me Much"
18. "Party For Two"
19. "Rock This Country!"
20. "(If You're Not in It for Love) I'm Outta Here!"
21. "Man! I Feel Like a Woman!"

== Shows ==
List of performances showing date, attendance, and gross revenue
Date	Attendance	Revenue
Leg 1
May 10, 2024	31,063	$4,472,527.60
May 11, 2024	31,063	$4,472,527.60
May 15, 2024	31,063	$4,472,527.60
May 17, 2024	31,063	$4,472,527.60
May 18, 2024	31,063	$4,472,527.60
May 23, 2024	31,063	$4,472,527.60
May 25, 2024	31,063	$4,472,527.60
May 26, 2024	31,063	$4,472,527.60
Leg 2
August 23, 2024	25,566	$3,174,290.79
August 24, 2024	25,566	$3,174,290.79
August 29, 2024	25,566	$3,174,290.79
August 31, 2024	25,566	$3,174,290.79
September 1, 2024	25,566	$3,174,290.79
September 4, 2024	25,566	$3,174,290.79
September 6, 2024	25,566	$3,174,290.79
September 7, 2024	25,566	$3,174,290.79
Leg 3
November 29, 2024	27,473	$3,313,849.00
November 30, 2024	27,473	$3,313,849.00
December 4, 2024	27,473	$3,313,849.00
December 6, 2024	27,473	$3,313,849.00
December 7, 2024	27,473	$3,313,849.00
December 11, 2024	27,473	$3,313,849.00
December 13, 2024	27,473	$3,313,849.00
December 14, 2024	27,473	$3,313,849.00
Leg 4
January 22, 2025	30,991	$3,103,373.82
January 24, 2025	30,991	$3,103,373.82
January 25, 2025	30,991	$3,103,373.82
January 29, 2025	30,991	$3,103,373.82
January 31, 2025	30,991	$3,103,373.82
February 1, 2025	30,991	$3,103,373.82
February 5, 2025	30,991	$3,103,373.82
February 7, 2025	30,991	$3,103,373.82
February 8, 2025	30,991	$3,103,373.82

== See also ==
- Queen of Me Tour
- Let's Go! (residency)
