= Queen of Me Tour =

2023 concert tour by Shania Twain

- Tour by Shania Twain
- Promotional poster for the tour
- Associated album: Queen of Me
- Start date: April 28, 2023
- End date: November 14, 2023
- Legs: 3
- No. of shows: 68 in North America; 10 in Europe; 78 in total
- Attendance: 1.088 million
- Box office: $114.5 million

Shania Twain concert chronology
- Let's Go! (2019–22); Queen of Me Tour (2023); Come On Over - All The Hits! (2024–25)

The Queen of Me Tour was the fifth headlining concert tour by Canadian recording artist Shania Twain, in support of her sixth studio album Queen of Me (2023). The tour began on April 28, 2023, in Spokane, Washington, and concluded in Vancouver, Canada on November 14, 2023. It marks the singer's first tour in nearly five years, following a highly successful Vegas residency run, Let's Go! which ran from 2019 through 2022.

== Background ==
Twain announced the tour alongside the album Queen of Me on October 28, 2022, through her Instagram account:

"I want to celebrate this new chapter with you all on my tour! Vegas has been a dream, but I'm ready to be on the road and sing with you, dance with you and have a kick ass night out with you! This one's gonna be a big party—no inhibitions, no conditions, let's get a little out of line!! I'll be Queen of Me—you be Queen of YOU!"

The tour was scheduled to kick off on April 28, 2023, in Spokane, United States and set to conclude on September 26, 2023, in Birmingham, United Kingdom, comprising 49 shows across North America and Europe. Tickets were go on sale on November 4, 2022, though pre-sales available on November 1, 2022, and she also announced that $1 from each ticket is donated to her children-focused charity, Shania Kids Can. On November 28, 2022, Twain added five additional dates to the tour, including extra shows in Moncton and Glasgow, and new shows in Bethel, New Orleans, and Leeds.

On December 6, 2022, she announced the 19-new dates for the second leg of the tour due to "phenomenal demand" following the wildly successful announcement of the first leg. Starting on October 12, 2023, in San Antonio, Texas with stops across North America in Nashville, Toronto, Buffalo, Edmonton, and more before wrapping up on November 14, 2023, in Vancouver, Canada, making it a total of 76 shows.

== Critical response ==
Sterling Whitaker from Taste of Country praised the show, calling it "one of the most elaborate productions of her entire career." While RETROPOP calling it "a dazzling set of new material, career classics, and deep cuts." From Variety, Chris Willman reported on Twain's Hollywood Bowl show, citing, "when [Twain] pulled ["Man! I Feel Like a Woman!"] out as her inevitable final encore number Saturday, it still felt like it was cresting." On the subject of Twain's new material against old, Roman Gokham from RIFF Magazine praised the setlist, stating, "Shania Twain was every bit the pop-country diva at her sold-out show… But nearly as impressive was how well the songs from her new album, Queen of Me, fit in alongside the classics." While Joel Swenson from The Current reported on Shania Twain herself, citing, "two things were abundantly clear throughout Twain's set. First, she was having an absolute blast, as were her band and dancers... Secondly, Shania Twain really loves her fans. Besides shaking hands and fist-bumping people during the opening number, she found plenty of other opportunities to interact with fans."

Marc Bearden from Palm Springs Tribune praised the Palm Springs show, quoted as saying, "it truly was a celebration of all things Shania." From Tulsa World, Andrea Eger stating, "thanks to Twain, it was fans' prerogative to have a little fun and leave the joint on a show-ending high." While Laura Klokowski from Music and Tour News praised the first-ever concert at Geodis Park in Nashville, saying, "....she delivered a barnstorming set of old and new hits with stunning moments of intimacy thrown in..... Overall, Shania Twain showcased just why she is the queen of pop-country with an electric set that showcased her incredible on-stage presence." From Le Journal de Québec, Yves Leclerc reported on Shania Twain's Videotron Centre show, citing, "Shania Twain on fire, fit and entertaining."

Matt Bailey from The Music Universe proclaimed, "a Shania Twain show is not complete without some sparkle. After all, the glam is an extension of Twain's empowering music: it screams individuality and self-confidence." Twain's show at PNC Music Pavilion in Charlotte, NC was critically acclaimed by several news outlets. Théoden Janes from Charlotte Observer reported, "Shania put on a masterclass in country-music show-womanship, delivering energetic, joy-filled renditions of hits from 20-plus years ago in a variety of clever stagings, while wearing outfits that no doubt sparked conversations." While Jeff Hahne from Queen City Nerve who was also in attendance at the Charlotte show, wrote, "for fans in Charlotte on Wednesday night, one thing was clear: Shania Twain is still the one fans want… Shania Twain delivered a solid performance from start to finish."

Shania's Queen Of Me Tour continued in the United Kingdom and Ireland in September. Tara Hepburn from The Skinny gave opening night at OVO Hydro in Glasgow a 5 star review, quoted as saying, "Shania Twain's Queen of Me Tour has it all and more", while Katie Hawthorne from The Guardian reported, "Backed by cowboys and aliens, the all-conquering country-pop outlier dons that leopard-print catsuit and leads her crowd through hit after hit". Thomas Curtis-Horsfall from Smooth Radio was in attendance of the shows at The O2 Arena in London, quoted as saying, "I wouldn't have thought it possible for a legendary star to have as much fun during a concert as her crowds, but Shania - in this new era of self-acceptance, self-confidence, and contentment - made it possible." Alastair James from Attitude Magazine, simply stated, "This is how it's done" with a glowing 5-star review.

== Set list ==
North America

Spokane April 28, 2023 – Saskatoon May 12, 2023
1. "Waking Up Dreaming"
2. "Up!
3. "Don't Be Stupid (You Know I Love You)"
4. "I'm Gonna Getcha Good"
5. "Roll Me on the River"
6. "You're Still the One"
7. "Giddy Up!"
8. "Any Man of Mine"
9. "Whose Bed Have Your Boots Been Under?"
10. "Honey, I'm Home"
11. "Last Day of Summer"
12. "Inhale/Exhale AIR"
13. "Rock This Country!"
14. "Nah!" / "She's Not Just a Pretty Face" / "Waiter! Bring Me Water!" / "When" / "Thank You Baby! (For Makin' Someday Come So Soon)"
15. "Pretty Liar"
16. "From This Moment On"
17. "Number One"
18. "Party for Two"
19. "Forever and For Always"
20. "Queen of Me"
  Encore
21. "That Don't Impress Me Much"
22. "Man! I Feel Like a Woman!"
Winnipeg May 14, 2023 – Tulsa June 3, 2023
1. "Waking Up Dreaming"
2. "Up!"
3. "Don't Be Stupid (You Know I Love You)"
4. "I'm Gonna Getcha Good"
5. "Roll Me on the River"
6. "You're Still the One"
7. "Giddy Up!"
8. "Any Man of Mine"
9. "Whose Bed Have Your Boots Been Under?"
10. "Honey, I'm Home"
11. "Inhale/Exhale AIR"
12. "Rock This Country!"
13. "Nah!" / "She's Not Just a Pretty Face" / "Waiter! Bring Me Water!" / "When" / "Thank You Baby! (For Makin' Someday Come So Soon)"
14. "Pretty Liar"
15. "From This Moment On"
16. "Number One"
17. "Party for Two"
18. "Forever and For Always"
19. "Queen of Me"
  Encore
20. "That Don't Impress Me Much"
21. "Man! I Feel Like a Woman!"
Maryland Heights June 4, 2023
1. "Waking Up Dreaming"
2. "Up!"
3. "Don't Be Stupid (You Know I Love You)"
4. "I'm Gonna Getcha Good"
5. "Roll Me on the River"
6. "You're Still the One"
7. "Giddy Up!"
8. "Any Man of Mine"
9. "Whose Bed Have Your Boots Been Under?"
10. "Honey, I'm Home"
11. "(If You're Not in It for Love) I'm Outta Here!"
12. "Rock This Country!"
13. "Nah!" / "She's Not Just a Pretty Face" / "Waiter! Bring Me Water!" / "When" / "Thank You Baby! (For Makin' Someday Come So Soon)"
14. "Pretty Liar"
15. "From This Moment On"
16. "Number One"
17. "Party for Two"
18. "Forever and For Always"
19. "Queen of Me"
  Encore
20. "That Don't Impress Me Much"
21. "Man! I Feel Like a Woman!"
Nashville June 7, 2023 – Camden June 9, 2023
1. "Waking Up Dreaming"
2. "Up!"
3. "Don't Be Stupid (You Know I Love You)"
4. "I'm Gonna Getcha Good"
5. "Roll Me on the River"
6. "You're Still the One"
7. "Giddy Up!"
8. "Any Man of Mine"
9. "Whose Bed Have Your Boots Been Under?"
10. "Honey, I'm Home"
11. "Inhale/Exhale AIR"
12. "Rock This Country!"
13. "Nah!" / "She's Not Just a Pretty Face" / "Waiter! Bring Me Water!" / "When" / "Thank You Baby! (For Makin' Someday Come So Soon)"
14. "(If You're Not in It for Love) I'm Outta Here!"
15. "From This Moment On"
16. "Number One"
17. "Party for Two"
18. "Forever and For Always"
19. "Queen of Me"
  Encore
20. "That Don't Impress Me Much"
21. "Man! I Feel Like a Woman!"
Halifax June 12, 2023 – Quebec City June 17, 2023
1. "Waking Up Dreaming"
2. "Up!"
3. "Don't Be Stupid (You Know I Love You)"
4. "I'm Gonna Getcha Good"
5. "Roll Me on the River"
6. "You're Still the One"
7. "Giddy Up!"
8. "Any Man of Mine"
9. "Whose Bed Have Your Boots Been Under?"
10. "Honey, I'm Home"
11. "Rock This Country!"
12. "Nah!" / "She's Not Just a Pretty Face" / "Waiter! Bring Me Water!" / "When" / "Thank You Baby! (For Makin' Someday Come So Soon)"
13. "Pretty Liar"
14. "(If You're Not in It for Love) I'm Outta Here!"
15. "From This Moment On"
16. "Number One"
17. "Party for Two"
18. "Forever and For Always"
19. "Queen of Me"
  Encore
20. "That Don't Impress Me Much"
21. "Man! I Feel Like a Woman!"
Montreal June 18, 2023
1. "Waking Up Dreaming"
2. "Up!"
3. "Don't Be Stupid (You Know I Love You)"
4. "I'm Gonna Getcha Good"
5. "Roll Me on the River"
6. "You're Still the One"
7. "Giddy Up!"
8. "Any Man of Mine"
9. "Whose Bed Have Your Boots Been Under?"
10. "Honey, I'm Home"
11. "Rock This Country!"
12. "Nah!" / "She's Not Just a Pretty Face" / "Waiter! Bring Me Water!" / "When" / "Thank You Baby! (For Makin' Someday Come So Soon)"
13. "(If You're Not in It for Love) I'm Outta Here!"
14. "From This Moment On"
15. "Number One"
16. "Forever and For Always"
17. "Queen of Me"
  Encore
18. "That Don't Impress Me Much"
19. "Man! I Feel Like a Woman!"
Hamilton June 20, 2023 – Toronto June 24, 2023
1. "Waking Up Dreaming"
2. "Up!"
3. "Don't Be Stupid (You Know I Love You)"
4. "I'm Gonna Getcha Good"
5. "Come On Over"
6. "You're Still the One"
7. "Giddy Up!"
8. "Any Man of Mine"
9. "Whose Bed Have Your Boots Been Under?"
10. "Honey, I'm Home"
11. "Rock This Country!"
12. "Nah!" / "She's Not Just a Pretty Face" / "Waiter! Bring Me Water!" / "When" / "Thank You Baby! (For Makin' Someday Come So Soon)"
13. "(If You're Not in It for Love) I'm Outta Here!"
14. "From This Moment On"
15. "Number One"
16. "Forever and For Always"
17. "Queen of Me"
  Encore
18. "That Don't Impress Me Much"
19. "Man! I Feel Like a Woman!"
Columbia June 27, 2023
1. "Waking Up Dreaming"
2. "Up!"
3. "Don't Be Stupid (You Know I Love You)"
4. "I'm Gonna Getcha Good"
5. "You're Still the One"
6. "Giddy Up!"
7. "Any Man of Mine"
8. "Whose Bed Have Your Boots Been Under?"
9. "Honey, I'm Home"
10. "Rock This Country!"
11. "Nah!" / "She's Not Just a Pretty Face" / "Waiter! Bring Me Water!" / "When" / "Thank You Baby! (For Makin' Someday Come So Soon)"
12. "(If You're Not in It for Love) I'm Outta Here!"
13. "From This Moment On"
14. "Number One"
15. "Forever and For Always"
16. "Queen of Me"
  Encore
17. "That Don't Impress Me Much"
18. "Man! I Feel Like a Woman!"
Charlotte June 28, 2023 – Cuyahoga Falls June 30, 2023
1. "Waking Up Dreaming"
2. "Up!"
3. "Don't Be Stupid (You Know I Love You)"
4. "I'm Gonna Getcha Good"
5. "Come On Over"
6. "You're Still the One"
7. "Giddy Up!"
8. "Any Man of Mine"
9. "Whose Bed Have Your Boots Been Under?"
10. "Honey, I'm Home"
11. "Rock This Country!"
12. "Nah!" / "She's Not Just a Pretty Face" / "Waiter! Bring Me Water!" / "When" / "Thank You Baby! (For Makin' Someday Come So Soon)"
13. "Pretty Liar"
14. "(If You're Not in It for Love) I'm Outta Here!"
15. "From This Moment On"
16. "Number One"
17. "Forever and For Always"
18. "Queen of Me"
  Encore
19. "That Don't Impress Me Much"
20. "Man! I Feel Like a Woman!"
Tinley Park July 1, 2023 – Bethel July 3, 2023
1. "Waking Up Dreaming"
2. "Up!"
3. "Don't Be Stupid (You Know I Love You)"
4. "I'm Gonna Getcha Good"
5. "You're Still the One"
6. "Giddy Up!"
7. "Any Man of Mine"
8. "Whose Bed Have Your Boots Been Under?"
9. "Honey, I'm Home"
10. "Rock This Country!"
11. "Nah!" / "She's Not Just a Pretty Face" / "Waiter! Bring Me Water!" / "When" / "Thank You Baby! (For Makin' Someday Come So Soon)"
12. "(If You're Not in It for Love) I'm Outta Here!"
13. "From This Moment On"
14. "Number One"
15. "Forever and For Always"
16. "Queen of Me"
  Encore
17. "That Don't Impress Me Much"
18. "Man! I Feel Like a Woman!"
Ottawa July 6, 2023
1. "Waking Up Dreaming"
2. "Up!"
3. "Don't Be Stupid (You Know I Love You)"
4. "I'm Gonna Getcha Good"
5. "Come On Over"
6. "You're Still the One"
7. "Giddy Up!"
8. "Any Man of Mine"
9. "Whose Bed Have Your Boots Been Under?"
10. "Honey, I'm Home"
11. "(If You're Not in It for Love) I'm Outta Here!"
12. "From This Moment On"
13. "Number One"
14. "Party for Two"
15. "Forever and For Always"
16. "Rock This Country!"
  Encore
17. "That Don't Impress Me Much"
18. "Man! I Feel Like a Woman!"
Syracuse July 8, 2023 – Mansfield July 9, 2023
1. "Waking Up Dreaming"
2. "Up!"
3. "Don't Be Stupid (You Know I Love You)"
4. "I'm Gonna Getcha Good"
5. "You're Still the One"
6. "Giddy Up!"
7. "Any Man of Mine"
8. "Whose Bed Have Your Boots Been Under?"
9. "Honey, I'm Home"
10. "Inhale/Exhale AIR"
11. "Party for Two"
12. "From This Moment On"
13. "Nah!" / "She's Not Just a Pretty Face" / "Waiter! Bring Me Water!" / "When" / "Thank You Baby! (For Makin' Someday Come So Soon)"
14. "Forever and For Always"
15. "Number One"
16. "Rock This Country!"
  Encore
17. "That Don't Impress Me Much"
18. "Man! I Feel Like a Woman!"
New York City July 11, 2023 – Burgettstown July 13, 2023
1. "Waking Up Dreaming"
2. "Up!"
3. "Don't Be Stupid (You Know I Love You)"
4. "I'm Gonna Getcha Good"
5. "You're Still the One"
6. "Giddy Up!"
7. "Any Man of Mine"
8. "Whose Bed Have Your Boots Been Under?"
9. "Honey, I'm Home"
10. "Inhale/Exhale AIR"
11. "Party for Two"
12. "From This Moment On"
13. "Nah!" / "She's Not Just a Pretty Face" / "Waiter! Bring Me Water!" / "When" / "Thank You Baby! (For Makin' Someday Come So Soon)"
14. "Forever and For Always"
15. "Number One"
16. "Rock This Country!"
  Encore
17. "That Don't Impress Me Much"
18. "(If You're Not in It for Love) I'm Outta Here!"
19. "Man! I Feel Like a Woman!"
Noblesville July 15, 2023
1. "Waking Up Dreaming"
2. "Up!"
3. "Don't Be Stupid (You Know I Love You)"
4. "I'm Gonna Getcha Good"
5. "You're Still the One"
6. "Giddy Up!"
7. "Any Man of Mine"
8. "Whose Bed Have Your Boots Been Under?"
9. "Honey, I'm Home"
10. "Inhale/Exhale AIR"
11. "Party for Two"
12. "From This Moment On"
13. "Nah!" / "She's Not Just a Pretty Face" / "Waiter! Bring Me Water!" / "When" / "Thank You Baby! (For Makin' Someday Come So Soon)"
14. "Forever and For Always"
15. "Pretty Liar"
16. "Rock This Country!"
  Encore
17. "That Don't Impress Me Much"
18. "(If You're Not in It for Love) I'm Outta Here!"
19. "Man! I Feel Like a Woman!"
Kansas City July 19, 2023 – Dallas July 21, 2023
1. "Waking Up Dreaming"
2. "Up!"
3. "Don't Be Stupid (You Know I Love You)"
4. "I'm Gonna Getcha Good"
5. "You're Still the One"
6. "Giddy Up!"
7. "Any Man of Mine"
8. "Whose Bed Have Your Boots Been Under?"
9. "Honey, I'm Home"
10. "Number One"
11. "Party for Two"
12. "From This Moment On"
13. "Nah!" / "She's Not Just a Pretty Face" / "Waiter! Bring Me Water!" / "When" / "Thank You Baby! (For Makin' Someday Come So Soon)"
14. "Forever and For Always"
15. "Pretty Liar"
16. "Rock This Country!"
  Encore
17. "That Don't Impress Me Much"
18. "(If You're Not in It for Love) I'm Outta Here!"
19. "Man! I Feel Like a Woman!"
The Woodlands July 22, 2023 – New Orleans July 24, 2023
1. "Waking Up Dreaming"
2. "Up!"
3. "Don't Be Stupid (You Know I Love You)"
4. "I'm Gonna Getcha Good"
5. "You're Still the One"
6. "Giddy Up!"
7. "Any Man of Mine"
8. "Whose Bed Have Your Boots Been Under?"
9. "Honey, I'm Home"
10. "Party for Two"
11. "From This Moment On"
12. "Queen of Me"
13. "(If You're Not in It for Love) I'm Outta Here!"
14. "Forever and For Always"
15. "Pretty Liar"
16. "Rock This Country!"
  Encore
17. "That Don't Impress Me Much"
18. "Man! I Feel Like a Woman!"
Austin October 7, 2023
1. "Waking Up Dreaming"
2. "Up!"
3. "Don't Be Stupid (You Know I Love You)"
4. "I'm Gonna Getcha Good"
5. "Come On Over"
6. "You're Still the One"
7. "Giddy Up!"
8. "Any Man of Mine"
9. "Whose Bed Have Your Boots Been Under?"
10. "Honey, I'm Home"
11. "From This Moment On"
12. "You Win My Love"
13. "Party for Two"
14. "(If You're Not in It for Love) I'm Outta Here!"
15. "Forever and For Always"
16. "Rock This Country!"
17. "That Don't Impress Me Much"
18. "Man! I Feel Like a Woman!"
San Antonio October 12, 2023 & Knoxville October 16, 2023 – Buffalo October 20, 2023
1. "Waking Up Dreaming"
2. "Up!"
3. "Don't Be Stupid (You Know I Love You)"
4. "I'm Gonna Getcha Good"
5. "Come On Over"
6. "You're Still the One"
7. "Giddy Up!"
8. "Any Man of Mine"
9. "Whose Bed Have Your Boots Been Under?"
10. "Honey, I'm Home"
11. "Rock This Country!"
12. "Nah!" / "She's Not Just a Pretty Face" / "Waiter! Bring Me Water!" / "When" / "Thank You Baby! (For Makin' Someday Come So Soon)"
13. "Pretty Liar"
14. "From This Moment On"
15. "Number One"
16. "Party for Two"
17. "Forever and For Always"
18. "(If You're Not in It for Love) I'm Outta Here!"
  Encore
19. "That Don't Impress Me Much"
20. "Man! I Feel Like a Woman!"
Fort Worth October 13, 2023
1. "Waking Up Dreaming"
2. "Up!"
3. "Don't Be Stupid (You Know I Love You)"
4. "I'm Gonna Getcha Good"
5. "Come On Over"
6. "You're Still the One"
7. "Giddy Up!"
8. "Any Man of Mine"
9. "Whose Bed Have Your Boots Been Under?"
10. "Honey, I'm Home"
11. "Spoonful"
12. "Rock This Country!"
13. "Nah!" / "She's Not Just a Pretty Face" / "Waiter! Bring Me Water!" / "When" / "Thank You Baby! (For Makin' Someday Come So Soon)"
14. "Pretty Liar"
15. "From This Moment On"
16. "Number One"
17. "Party for Two"
18. "Forever and For Always"
19. "(If You're Not in It for Love) I'm Outta Here!"
  Encore
20. "That Don't Impress Me Much"
21. "Man! I Feel Like a Woman!"

Europe

Glasgow September 14, 2023
1. "Waking Up Dreaming"
2. "Up!"
3. "Don't Be Stupid (You Know I Love You)"
4. "I'm Gonna Getcha Good"
5. "Come On Over"
6. "You're Still the One"
7. "Giddy Up!"
8. "Any Man of Mine"
9. "Whose Bed Have Your Boots Been Under?"
10. "Honey, I'm Home"
11. "Inhale/Exhale AIR"
12. "Nah!" / "She's Not Just a Pretty Face" / "Waiter! Bring Me Water!" / "When" / "Thank You Baby! (For Makin' Someday Come So Soon)"
13. "Pretty Liar"
14. "From this Moment On"
15. "Life's About To Get Good" - "Sang with a fan that was brought on stage called Matty
16. "Number One"
17. "Party for Two"
18. "Forever and For Always"
19. "Rock this Country!"
  Encore
20. "That Don't Impress Me Much"
21. "Man! I Feel Like a Woman!"
London September 16, 2023 – Dublin September 20, 2023
1. "Waking Up Dreaming"
2. "Up!"
3. "Don't Be Stupid (You Know I Love You)"
4. "I'm Gonna Getcha Good"
5. "Come On Over"
6. "You're Still the One"
7. "Giddy Up!"
8. "Any Man of Mine"
9. "Whose Bed Have Your Boots Been Under?"
10. "Honey, I'm Home"
11. "Inhale/Exhale AIR"
12. "Party for Two"
13. "Nah!" / "She's Not Just a Pretty Face" / "Waiter! Bring Me Water!" / "When" / "Thank You Baby! (For Makin' Someday Come So Soon)"
14. "Pretty Liar"
15. "From this Moment On"
16. "Number One"
17. "Forever and For Always"
18. "Rock this Country!"
  Encore
19. "That Don't Impress Me Much"
20. "Man! I Feel Like a Woman!"
Glasgow September 22, 2023, Manchester September 25, 2023 – Leeds September 28, 2023
1. "Waking Up Dreaming"
2. "Up!"
3. "Don't Be Stupid (You Know I Love You)"
4. "I'm Gonna Getcha Good"
5. "Come On Over"
6. "You're Still the One"
7. "Giddy Up!"
8. "Any Man of Mine"
9. "Whose Bed Have Your Boots Been Under?"
10. "Honey, I'm Home"
11. "Inhale/Exhale AIR"
12. "Party for Two"
13. "Nah!" / "She's Not Just a Pretty Face" / "Waiter! Bring Me Water!" / "When" / "Thank You Baby! (For Makin' Someday Come So Soon)"
14. "Pretty Liar"
15. "From this Moment On"
16. "Number One"
17. "Forever and For Always"
18. "(If You're Not in It for Love) I'm Outta Here!"
  Encore
19. "That Don't Impress Me Much"
20. "Man! I Feel Like a Woman!"
Glasgow September 23, 2023
1. "Waking Up Dreaming"
2. "Up!"
3. "Don't Be Stupid (You Know I Love You)"
4. "I'm Gonna Getcha Good"
5. "Come On Over"
6. "You're Still the One"
7. "Giddy Up!"
8. "Any Man of Mine"
9. "Whose Bed Have Your Boots Been Under?"
10. "Honey, I'm Home"
11. "Inhale/Exhale AIR"
12. "Nah!" / "She's Not Just a Pretty Face" / "Waiter! Bring Me Water!" / "When" / "Thank You Baby! (For Makin' Someday Come So Soon)"
13. "Pretty Liar"
14. "From this Moment On"
15. "Number One"
16. "Party for Two"
17. "Forever and For Always"
18. "(If You're Not in It for Love) I'm Outta Here!"
  Encore
19. "That Don't Impress Me Much"
20. "Man! I Feel Like a Woman!"
Notes
- During the Spokane and first London concerts, Twain covered Tami Neilson's "Mammas Don't Let Your Babies Grow Up to Be Cowboys".
- During the Winnipeg concert, Twain surprised the fans by singing her 2005 single-released "Don't!" for the first time ever.
- During the Palm Desert concert, Twain performed a snippet of "You've Got A Way" for the first time in 20 years, by request of a fan she brought onstage.
- On June 7, Twain was joined by Kelsea Ballerini and Tanya Tucker and Wynonna Judd to perform "(If You're Not in It for Love) I'm Outta Here!" and "Man! I Feel Like a Woman!", respectively.
- Twain was joined by Breland to perform "Inhale/Exhale AIR" on June 7–9, July 8–15, and September 14–28.
- During the Columbia concert, the performances of "Rock This Country!", "Giddy Up!", and "Man! I Feel Like a Woman!" were shot and included in CNN's The Fourth in America broadcast.
- During the Ottawa concert, Twain was joined by Lindsay Ell to perform "(If You're Not in It for Love) I'm Outta Here!".
- "Party for Two" was performed with Breland on July 8–15, September 16–20, September 25–28, and October 7.
- During the New York City concert, Twain sung a snippet of Dolly Parton's I Will Always Love You.
- During the Brooklyn concert, Billy Currington joined Twain onstage for "Party for Two".
- During the first London concert, Twain sung a snippet of her song, "C'est la vie" for the first time in nearly 20 years.
- During the concert in Fort Worth, "Spoonful" was performed with Ray Parker Jr..
- During the concert in Raleigh, Twain and a fan from the audience performed You Win My Love.
- During the third Calgary concert, Twain sung a snippet of the song "I'm Jealous" live for the first time ever.
- As part of the Europe leg, Twain performed two shorter intimate shows in a Pryzm nightclub in Kingston, London as the final shows (September 29, 2023).

== Shows ==
List of concerts showing date, city, country, venue, tickets sold, number of available tickets and amount of gross revenue
Date	City	Country	Venue	Opening act(s)	Attendance	Revenue
North America
April 28, 2023	Spokane	United States	Spokane Arena	Lindsay Ell	10,784 / 10,784	$1,407,476
April 29, 2023	Seattle	United States	Climate Pledge Arena	Lindsay Ell	14,460 / 14,460	$1,889,765
May 2, 2023	Vancouver	Canada	Rogers Arena	Lindsay Ell	26,367 / 26,367	$3,336,370
May 3, 2023	Vancouver	Canada	Rogers Arena	Lindsay Ell	26,367 / 26,367	$3,336,370
May 5, 2023	Edmonton	Canada	Rogers Place	Lindsay Ell	26,909 / 26,909	$3,481,044
May 6, 2023	Edmonton	Canada	Rogers Place	Lindsay Ell	26,909 / 26,909	$3,481,044
May 9, 2023	Calgary	Canada	Scotiabank Saddledome	Lindsay Ell	25,175 / 25,175	$2,967,807
May 10, 2023	Calgary	Canada	Scotiabank Saddledome	Lindsay Ell	25,175 / 25,175	$2,967,807
May 12, 2023	Saskatoon	Canada	SaskTel Centre	Lindsay Ell	12,869 / 12,869	$1,603,376
May 14, 2023	Winnipeg	Canada	Canada Life Centre	Lindsay Ell	11,661 / 11,661	$1,589,376
May 16, 2023	Madison	United States	Kohl Center	Hailey Whitters	10,899 / 10,899	$1,467,814
May 17, 2023	Saint Paul	United States	Xcel Energy Center	Hailey Whitters	14,974 / 14,974	$2,084,023
May 19, 2023	Lincoln	United States	Pinnacle Bank Arena	Hailey Whitters	12,773 / 12,773	$1,733,891
May 21, 2023	Denver	United States	Ball Arena	Hailey Whitters	12,845 / 12,845	$1,753,976
May 24, 2023	West Valley City	United States	USANA Amphitheatre	Hailey Whitters	21,474 / 21,474	$1,552,203
May 26, 2023	Mountain View	United States	Shoreline Amphitheatre	Hailey Whitters	22,604 / 22,604	$1,449,834
May 28, 2023	Los Angeles	United States	Hollywood Bowl	Hailey Whitters	17,287 / 17,287	$2,371,554
May 30, 2023	Phoenix	United States	Talking Stick Resort Amphitheatre	Hailey Whitters	19,075 / 19,075	$1,554,307
May 31, 2023	Palm Desert	United States	Acrisure Arena	Hailey Whitters	9,182 / 9,182	$1,177,250
June 3, 2023	Tulsa	United States	BOK Center	Breland	12,390 / 12,390	$1,714,843
June 4, 2023	Maryland Heights	United States	Hollywood Casino Amphitheatre	Breland	20,055 / 20,055	$1,563,734
June 7, 2023	Nashville	United States	Geodis Park	Breland; Kelsea Ballerini	27,707 / 27,707	$3,606,876
June 9, 2023	Camden	United States	Freedom Mortgage Pavilion	Breland	23,936 / 23,936	$1,421,512
June 12, 2023	Halifax	Canada	Scotiabank Centre	Robyn Ottolini	9,692 / 9,692	$1,025,545
June 14, 2023	Moncton	Canada	Avenir Centre	Robyn Ottolini	15,827 / 15,827	$2,551,939
June 15, 2023	Moncton	Canada	Avenir Centre	Robyn Ottolini	15,827 / 15,827	$2,551,939
June 17, 2023	Quebec City	Canada	Vidéotron Centre	Robyn Ottolini	13,301 / 13,301	$1,512,468
June 18, 2023	Montreal	Canada	Bell Centre	Robyn Ottolini	14,566 / 14,566	$1,737,411
June 20, 2023	Hamilton	Canada	FirstOntario Centre	Lindsay Ell	12,464 / 12,464	$1,521,196
June 21, 2023	London	Canada	Budweiser Gardens	Lindsay Ell	9,067 / 9,067	$1,099,710
June 23, 2023	Toronto	Canada	Budweiser Stage	Lindsay Ell	31,659 / 31,659	$3,242,657
June 24, 2023	Toronto	Canada	Budweiser Stage	Lindsay Ell	31,659 / 31,659	$3,242,657
June 27, 2023	Columbia	United States	Merriweather Post Pavilion	Priscilla Block	17,438 / 17,438	$2,060,811
June 28, 2023	Charlotte	United States	PNC Music Pavilion	Priscilla Block	18,850 / 18,850	$1,719,554
June 30, 2023	Cuyahoga Falls	United States	Blossom Music Center	Priscilla Block	21,595 / 21,595	$1,611,400
July 1, 2023	Tinley Park	United States	Credit Union 1 Amphitheatre	Priscilla Block	25,989 / 25,989	$1,797,184
July 3, 2023	Bethel	United States	Bethel Woods Center for the Arts	Priscilla Block	15,341 / 15,341	$1,274,892
July 6, 2023 (Note: Part of Ottawa Bluesfest.)	Ottawa	Canada	LeBreton Flats	—N/a	—N/a	—N/a
July 8, 2023	Syracuse	United States	St. Joseph's Health Amphitheater	Breland	20,026 / 20,026	$1,510,640
July 9, 2023	Mansfield	United States	Xfinity Center	Breland	19,966 / 19,966	$1,667,645
July 11, 2023	New York City	United States	Madison Square Garden	Breland	13,686 / 13,686	$2,000,675
July 13, 2023	Burgettstown	United States	The Pavilion at Star Lake	Breland	23,099 / 23,099	$1,376,979
July 15, 2023	Noblesville	United States	Ruoff Music Center	Breland	25,234 / 25,234	$1,638,324
July 16, 2023 (Note: Part of Faster Horses Festival.)	Brooklyn	United States	Michigan International Speedway	—N/a	—N/a	—N/a
July 19, 2023	Kansas City	United States	T-Mobile Center	Mickey Guyton	13,104 / 13,104	$1,679,599
July 21, 2023	Dallas	United States	Dos Equis Pavilion	Mickey Guyton	20,245 / 20,245	$1,630,795
July 22, 2023	The Woodlands	United States	Cynthia Woods Mitchell Pavilion	Mickey Guyton	15,551 / 15,551	$1,487,677
July 24, 2023	New Orleans	United States	Smoothie King Center	Mickey Guyton	12,142 / 12,142	$1,745,589
Europe
September 14, 2023	Glasgow	Scotland	OVO Hydro	Breland	11,264 / 11,264	$1,281,459
September 16, 2023	London	England	The O_{2} Arena	Breland	31,788 / 31,788	$3,648,380
September 17, 2023	London	England	The O_{2} Arena	Breland	31,788 / 31,788	$3,648,380
September 19, 2023	Dublin	Ireland	3Arena	Breland	26,086 / 26,086	$2,528,492
September 20, 2023	Dublin	Ireland	3Arena	Breland	26,086 / 26,086	$2,528,492
September 22, 2023	Glasgow	Scotland	OVO Hydro	Breland	22,961 / 22,961	$2,574,066
September 23, 2023	Glasgow	Scotland	OVO Hydro	Breland	22,961 / 22,961	$2,574,066
September 25, 2023	Manchester	England	AO Arena	Breland	14,965 / 14,965	$1,644,618
September 26, 2023	Birmingham	England	Utilita Arena Birmingham	Breland	12,572 / 12,572	$1,395,034
September 28, 2023	Leeds	England	First Direct Arena	Breland	10,924 / 10,924	$1,220,694
North America
October 7, 2023 (Note: Part of ACL Festival.)	Austin	United States	Zilker Park	—N/a	—N/a	—N/a
October 12, 2023	San Antonio	United States	Frost Bank Center	Lily Rose	12,975 / 14,983	$1,485,221
October 13, 2023	Fort Worth	United States	Dickies Arena	Lily Rose	11,634 / 11,930	$1,793,155
October 16, 2023	Knoxville	United States	Thompson-Boling Arena	Lily Rose	13,269 / 13,708	$1,661,859
October 18, 2023	Raleigh	United States	PNC Arena	Lily Rose	12,792 / 12,792	$1,597,483
October 20, 2023	Buffalo	United States	KeyBank Center	Lily Rose	12,271 / 13,233	$1,508,120
October 22, 2023	Toronto	Canada	Scotiabank Arena	TALK	15,014 / 15,014	$1,585,319
October 24, 2023	Quebec City	Canada	Videotron Centre	TALK	11,555 / 12,837	$730,985
October 25, 2023	Montreal	Canada	Bell Centre	TALK	13,185 / 13,185	$955,947
October 27, 2023	Columbus	United States	Schottenstein Center	Lily Rose	12,091 / 12,549	$1,642,054
October 28, 2023	Louisville	United States	KFC Yum! Center	Lily Rose	12,612 / 13,765	$1,628,898
October 31, 2023	Milwaukee	United States	Fiserv Forum	Lily Rose	9,684 / 10,358	$1,241,409
November 2, 2023	Omaha	United States	CHI Health Center Omaha	Lily Rose	10,338 / 10,492	$1,009,133
November 3, 2023	Des Moines	United States	Wells Fargo Arena	Lily Rose	12,008 / 12,583	$1,434,912
November 5, 2023	Fargo	United States	Fargodome	Lily Rose	19,340 / 19,340	$1,856,105
November 7, 2023	Winnipeg	Canada	Canada Life Centre	Tenille Townes	10,093 / 11,000	$752,589
November 9, 2023	Saskatoon	Canada	SaskTel Centre	Tenille Townes	9,897 / 10,671	$491,231
November 11, 2023	Calgary	Canada	Scotiabank Saddledome	Tenille Townes	12,138 / 12,473	$1,135,869
November 12, 2023	Edmonton	Canada	Rogers Place	Tenille Townes	13,023 / 13,885	$1,083,056
November 14, 2023	Vancouver	Canada	Rogers Arena	Tenille Townes	12,016 / 12,034	$1,078,080
Asia
November 25, 2023 (Note: Part of Formula 1 Abu Dhabi Grand Prix 2023.)	Abu Dhabi	United Arab Emirates	Etihad Park	—N/a	—N/a	—N/a
Total					1,088,763 / 1,099,660 (99%)	$114,583,889
