= David Stewart (Dynamite producer) =

British songwriter, producer and musician

- Origin: London, England
- Occupations: Songwriter; record producer; musician
- Label: Stellar Songs

David Stewart is a British songwriter, record producer, and musician. He co-wrote and produced BTS' song "Dynamite" (2020).

== Early years ==
Stewart's father is Allan Stewart, a Scottish actor, comedian, singer and pantomime artist. His mother is an actress and a dancer. Later on, she started a hospitality company that catered for major tours. His sister Kate is a musician working for Warner Music. Being in an artistic family, Stewart started very early and his father told the Scottish Daily Record that by the age of 3, Stewart was making up songs. In his early years, he ended up drumming in a band supporting Simply Red in a 15-arena tour all across the UK. In 2012, he released his mixtape Late Night Viewing and following that, a four-track EP called Dark Side of Paradise.

== Career ==
Stewart became a session guitarist playing in hundreds of live shows and gigs with Example, an English singer-rapper-producer, in the early 2010s.

Moving to Atlanta for two years, he wrote hundreds of songs and performed as a session musician many times. He returned to England writing and producing for young or up-and-coming artists. He ended up getting attention from major-label A&Rs and landed a cut with the UK rapper Tinie Tempah in his 2017 album track "Cameras". Stewart co-wrote the song and was featured in the track appearing on Tinie Tempah's 2017 album Youth. Discovering and working closely with the singer Claudia Valentina was another break. He also worked with Charlie Christie, managing artists like Rex Orange County. He became an A&R at Interscope Records, and with Neil Jacobson who runs Hallwood Media. Jacobson had been a former president of Geffen Records. Very soon, Stewart ended up writing and producing cuts for Hailee Steinfeld and the Jonas Brothers. The song "What a Man Gotta Do" co-written by Stewart became a hit for the Jonas Brothers in January 2020. Stewart was also associated with Tim Blacksmith and Danny D, founders of Stellar Songs, a publishing company that signed him.

=== BTS and "Dynamite" ===
In 2020, BTS's management was on the hunt for a songwriter and producer for an all-English song, a first for the group. Their choice fell on English songwriter/producer David Stewart and on songwriter Jessica Agombar. Stewart had collaborated many times with Agombar who worked for Atlantic Records and wrote for the girl group Parade. Neil Jacobson, Stewart's manager, sent the track to Columbia Records' CEO Ron Perry and Big Hit, BTS' record label in early July 2020. The creation process of the song "happened within a couple of months". On July 26, 2020, the group confirmed during a livestream on V Live that they would be releasing an English-language song on August 21, 2020, as the first single for their upcoming album Be with "Dynamite" becoming their most heavily promoted release thus far. Stewart said about his engagement process in an interview with Rolling Stone: "It was a bit of a 'holy grail' cut. I had quite a few conversations with big producers and writers in America who were trying to get it." In addition to co-writing the song, instrumentation was provided by Stewart, who played drums, percussion, bass guitar, synth bass, synthesizers, pads, piano, electric guitar, programmed horns and programmed strings. David Stewart and Jessica Agombar tied at No. 1 on Billboard magazine's Hot 100 Songwriters chart on the chart dated September 5, 2020 staying at the top for 3 consecutive weeks.

== Songwriting and production credits ==
Year	Artist	Song	Album	Ref.
2010	Example	"Won't Believe the Fools"	Won't Go Quietly	
2015	Danny Seth	"Past/Forever" feat. David Stewart	Perception	
2017	TroyBoi	"Showbiz" feat. David Stewart	Non-album single	
2017	KStewart	"Hands" feat. Yungen	Non-album single	
2017	Tinie Tempah	"Cameras" feat. David Stewart	Youth	
2017	TroyBoi	"Spooky" feat. David Stewart	Vibez EP	
2018	Naïka	"Serpentine"	Non-album single	
2018	Kate Stewart	"Strangers"	In the Beginning EP	
2020	Jonas Brothers	"What a Man Gotta Do"	Non-album single	
2020	Marina Kaye	"The Whole 9"	Twisted	
2020	Griff	"Good Stuff"	Non-album single	
2020	Hailee Steinfeld	"I Love You's"	Half Written Story EP	
2020	Eyelar	"Say It With Your Eyes"	Non-album single	
2020	BTS	"Dynamite"	Be	
2020	Alec Wigdahl	"Big Red Balloon"	Bill & Ted Face the Music OST	
2020	Marina Kaye	"Double Life"	Twisted	
2020	Marina Kaye	"7 Billion"	Twisted	
2020	Claudia Valentina	4:15	Claudia Valentina EP	
2020	Claudia Valentina	"If I'm Being Honest"	Claudia Valentina EP	
2020	Marina Kaye	"Scream"	Twisted	
2020	Marina Kaye	"Visions"	Twisted	
2020	Marina Kaye	"Blind Heart"	Twisted	
2020	Marina Kaye	"Anywhere But Home"	Twisted	
2020	Marina Kaye	"Alone"	Twisted	
2021	L.L.A.M.A.	"Shake" with Ne-Yo and Cameron DeLeon	Non-album single	
2021	Anthony Ramos	"Lose My Mind"	Love and Lies	
2021	Anthony Ramos	"Nobody Else"	Love and Lies	
2021	Jackson Wang	"Drive You Home" with Internet Money	Non-album single	
2021	Jonas Brothers	"Who's in Your Head"	Non-album single	
2021	Alan Walker	"Man on the Moon" with Benjamin Ingrosso	World of Walker	
2021	Monsta X	"You Problem"	The Dreaming	
2022	Ava Max	"Million Dollar Baby"	Diamonds & Dancefloors	
2022	Shania Twain	"Waking Up Dreaming"	Queen of Me	
2022	Olly Murs	"Die of a Broken Heart"	Marry Me	
2023	Shania Twain	"Giddy Up!"	Queen of Me	
2023	Jungkook	"3D" with Jack Harlow	Golden	
2023	Jungkook	"Too Sad To Dance"	Golden	
2023	Jungkook	"Shot Glass of Tears"	Golden	
2023	&Team	"Dropkick"	First Howling: Me	
2024	New Kids on the Block	"Kids"	Still Kids	
