= You're Still the One =

1998 single by Shania Twain

Single by Shania Twain

from the album Come On Over
- B-side: "Don't Be Stupid (You Know I Love You)"; "(If You're Not in It for Love) I'm Outta Here!"; "You Win My Love"
- Released: January 13, 1998
- Studio: Masterfonics (Nashville, Tennessee)
- Genre: Country pop
- Length: 3:34
- Label: Mercury
- Songwriters: Shania Twain; Robert John "Mutt" Lange
- Producer: Robert John "Mutt" Lange

Shania Twain singles chronology
"Don't Be Stupid (You Know I Love You)" (1997)	"You're Still the One" (1998)	"From This Moment On" (1998)

Music video
- "You're Still the One" on YouTube

"You're Still the One" is a song recorded by Canadian singer Shania Twain for her third studio album Come On Over (1997). The song was inspired by criticism of Twain's relationship with her then-husband and producer Robert John "Mutt" Lange and depicts her celebrating their marriage despite the difficulties and differences between the two. Written by Twain and Lange, it is a piano-driven country pop ballad incorporating guitar, organ, and mandolin. Mercury Records released "You're Still the One" to U.S. contemporary hit radio stations on January 13, 1998, as the album's first pop radio single. The song was later serviced to U.S. country radio stations as the third single from Come On Over on February 13, 1998.

"You're Still the One" received positive reviews from music critics, who praised its romantic lyrics and crossover appeal and deemed it one of Twain's best songs. At the 41st Annual Grammy Awards in 1999, "You're Still the One" garnered four nominations, including Record of the Year and Song of the Year, and won Best Country Song and Best Female Country Vocal Performance. It was a crossover success, peaking at number two on the U.S. Billboard Hot 100 chart and being certified double platinum by the Recording Industry Association of America (RIAA). It also reached number-one in Australia and peaked at number 10 in the U.K.

The music video for "You're Still the One", directed by David Hogan, shows Twain singing on a beach and male model John Devoe in a beach house. It was nominated for Best Female Video at the 1998 MTV Video Music Awards, making Twain the first female country artist nominated for an MTV Video Music Award. Twain has performed "You're Still the One" at television shows and included it on the set lists of various concert tours and residency shows. The song was covered by several artists, including Paula Fernandes who released a duet with Twain in 2014.

== Background and writing ==
Upon signing with U.S. label Mercury Nashville Records in 1991, Canadian singer Shania Twain released her eponymous debut studio album in April 1993. Despite the album being a commercial failure and selling only 100,000 units, Twain's singing voice and the music video for her debut single "What Made You Say That" caught the interest of Zambian record producer Robert John "Mutt" Lange. The two started collaborating on songwriting via phone calls and met for the first time at the Fan Fair festival, in June 1993. Soon after, they established a romantic relationship and wedded in December 1993. However, their relationship was criticized and viewed with skepticism by industry observers, who noted their different cultural backgrounds and the 17-year age gap between the two. Lange's artistic involvement in Twain's second studio album, The Woman in Me (1995), also sparked speculation that he was "a Svengali-like producer who demands total control in the studio and treats Twain as a puppet".

Twain herself noticed that people did not believe in their relationship, arguing that the differences between the two would make it unlikely to succeed; "They say, well, he married a young, good-looking girl, and she married a successful producer. So people thought it was based on that and certainly couldn't last". Twain wrote the autobiographical "You're Still the One" in response to the criticism and as a tribute to her successful marriage with Lange. She began working on the song by playing guitar and being in an introspective "folky singer/songwriter" state of mind. As she was composing lyrics and singing the chorus melody repeatedly, Lange came up with the counter-melody "You're still the one". Twain recalls that "all of a sudden we had a hit chorus" and that the song was completed shortly after. "You're Still the One", along with the rest of Come On Over (1997), was recorded at Masterfonics Tracking Room in Nashville, Tennessee, and mixed by Mike Shipley. Lange produced the track and sang background vocals.

== Music and lyrics ==
"You're Still the One" runs for three minutes and 34 seconds. It is a "gentle" country pop ballad. The instrumental includes piano, guitar, organ, mandolin, and a pedal steel solo played by Bruce Bouton on the bridge. The Boston Globe's Steve Morse found the use of an organ reminiscent of Procol Harum's "A Whiter Shade of Pale" (1967). On the international version of Come On Over, "You're Still the One" features a pop-oriented production and is one second shorter. The pop elements have been accentuated by removing the slide guitars and softening the fiddle and pedal steel parts. According to the sheet music published at Musicnotes.com, the song is composed in the key of E♭ major and set in the time signature of common time with a slow tempo of 67 beats per minute. It has a chord progression of E♭–E♭/G–A♭–B♭ and Twain's vocal range spans from the low note of G_{3} to the high note of B♭_{4}.

The song begins with a spoken introduction over a drumbeat, "When I first saw you, I saw love / And the first time you touched me, I felt love". Sociology professor Michael Hughes noted that although the introduction is spoken with "a voice characteristic of [Twain's] Ontario, Canada roots", the rest of the song is sung "with the strong suggestion of a standard, rural Southern accent characteristic of country music performances". Twain sings with "breathy" and "confident" vocals which author Jim Brown considered to be "the sole country element in sight". Twain described "You're Still the One" as "[her] own personal victory song". Lyrically, the song is about "the kind of triumph you feel, when you have a successful relationship and you win against the odds". Taylor Weatherby of Billboard said the lyrics reinforce the message that love can triumph through hard times. The song finds Twain celebrating the endurance of her marriage to Lange: "I'm so glad we made it / Look how far we've come, my baby".

== Release ==
In an attempt to crossover to the pop market, Mercury Records selected "You're Still the One" as the third single from Come On Over and Twain's first single to be sent to pop stations. It impacted U.S. contemporary hit radio on January 13, 1998, and was serviced to U.S. adult contemporary and hot adult contemporary radio stations on January 23, 1998. The song was later serviced to U.S. country stations on February 13, 1998. Luke Lewis, president of Mercury, discussed during an interview with Radio & Records magazine the risks of releasing a song to pop stations before country stations:

"We don't want to wreck a career just because we want to maximize a record. Shania's concerned about it, too. But at some point it becomes unfair to an artist to say, 'We're not going to get as much exposure as possible, because we might piss off some people at Country.' [sic]"

The label distributed in the U.S. CDs, cassettes, and 7-inch vinyls including a radio edit of "You're Still the One" and a remix version of "Don't Be Stupid (You Know I Love You)". Soul Solution produced dance mixes of "You're Still the One" that appeared on a maxi-CD single distributed in the U.S. and received airplay on pop and country stations. In continental Europe, "You're Still the One" was released on February 2, 1998, as the album's first single. In the U.K., Mercury released CDs and cassettes to retail on February 16, 1998. The cassette includes a radio edit of "You're Still the One" and a remix version of "(If You're Not in It for Love) I'm Outta Here!" remixed by Lange. The CD features an additional album version of "You're Still the One" and the "Mutt Lange Mix" of "You Win My Love". A CD single with the same track listing was also released in Japan on April 8, 1998.

== Critical reception ==
David Browne of Entertainment Weekly highlighted the song's spoken introduction, calling it "the most subtle work Twain's ever done" and comparing it to Janet Jackson's work. Writing for the Los Angeles Times, Geoff Boucher deemed "You're Still the One" Twain's signature song and wrote that its success "introduced her to a vast, general fan base". British magazine Music Week gave it a full score of five out of five, stating, "This strongly-tipped and heavily-backed country-pop singer has the quality to write all her own hits and delivers an instant radio smash. Sales will surely follow." Bobbie Jean Sawyer of Wide Open Country similarly regarded the song as "a career-defining moment for Twain".

Laura McClellan from Taste Of Country labeled it "an instant crossover hit" which solidified "[Twain's] status as a pop culture icon". CMT's Brian Rogala lauded the song's "catchy lyrics" and "classic theme of holding onto love despite the odds", calling it "one of the most memorable country love ballads of the '90s". George Varga of Copley News selected "You're Still the One" as an example of "the impeccably crafted blend of country twang, rock 'n' roll punch and sleek, radio-friendly pop that has made [Twain] one of the ultimate crossover artists of all time". Country Universe's Ben Foster praised Twain's vocal performance and her songwriting "that allows any couple to hear the song as their own story set to music".

Rolling Stone ranked the song number one on their list of Twain's greatest songs, classifying it as the "ultimate Y2K prom theme". On Consequence's list of the best songs of 1997, "You're Still the One" was placed 10th. Michael Roffman wrote that the track stood the test of time and "is still the country song everyone wants to hear", adding that Twain "didn't appeal strictly to the genre, but to the hooks and the melodies". Billboard placed "You're Still the One" at number 40 on their list of 1998's best songs. Weatherby praised the track for proving that Twain "wasn't just a country star — she was an all-around superstar". In 2005, "You're Still the One" was placed at number 69 on Blender's "The 500 Greatest Songs Since You Were Born". In 2026, Billboard ranked it number seven in their list of "The Biggest No. 2 Hot 100 Hits of All Time", noting that the song had peaked at number two, just behind Next's "Too Close" and Brandy & Monica's "The Boy Is Mine".

=== Accolades ===
At the 1998 Billboard Music Awards, "You're Still the One" won Top Country Song and was nominated for Top Hot 100 Song. It won Single of the Year at the 1998 Canadian Country Music Association Awards and received a nomination for Single Record of the Year at the 34th Academy of Country Music Awards. At the 41st Annual Grammy Awards in 1999, "You're Still the One" was nominated for Record of the Year and Song of the Year. It won Best Country Song and Best Female Country Vocal Performance. At the 2000 Ivor Novello Awards, "You're Still the One" earned a nomination for Best Song Musically and Lyrically.

== Commercial performance ==
"You're Still the One" was a crossover success, appealing to both country and pop audiences. In Canada, the song debuted at number 84 on the RPM 100 Hit Tracks issued for March 15, 1998. After 14 weeks, it peaked at number seven. The single topped the RPM Adult Contemporary Tracks and Country 100 charts, becoming Twain's first and ninth song, respectively, to achieve the milestone.

On the week ending February 14, 1998, "You're Still the One" debuted at number 51 on the U.S. Billboard Hot 100. The song peaked at number two on the issue dated May 2, 1998, behind Next's "Too Close" (1998). Earning sales of 88,000 units and 29 million radio audience impressions, it tied LeAnn Rimes' "How Do I Live" (1997) as the highest-peaking single by a country artist in the 1990s. After fluctuating down the chart, "You're Still the One" returned to number two on the U.S. Billboard Hot 100 issued for June 20, 1998, with 105,000 copies sold. It spent eight consecutive weeks at number two, blocked from the top by "The Boy Is Mine" (1998) by Brandy and Monica. "You're Still the One" remained on the U.S. Billboard Hot 100 chart for a total of 42 weeks and is Twain's highest-peaking single to date.

On Billboard's airplay charts, "You're Still the One" became Twain's sixth number-one on the U.S. Hot Country Singles & Tracks chart and spent eight weeks atop the U.S. Adult Contemporary chart. The song reached number three on the U.S. Mainstream Top 40 chart and was the highest-charting country crossover to pop radio in the U.S until Taylor Swift's chart-topping "Love Story" (2008). "You're Still the One" became Twain's first top-10 entry on the U.S. Adult Top 40 chart, peaking at number six. On the U.S. Hot Latin Tracks chart, the song debuted and peaked at number 37, making Twain the first country artist to enter the chart. "You're Still the One" was the best-selling country single of 1998 in the U.S. and was certified double platinum by the Recording Industry Association of America (RIAA), denoting shipments of over two million units.

Across Europe, "You're Still the One" reached number three in Ireland, number ten in the Netherlands, and peaked within the top-five of the airplay charts in Poland (two), Hungary (four), and Croatia (five). In the U.K., the song debuted at number 10 on the Singles Chart. It was certified platinum by the British Phonographic Industry (BPI) and sold 839,000 units in the U.K. as of April 2023, according to Official Charts Company. In Oceania, "You're Still the One" peaked at number nine on the New Zealand Singles Chart and spent four consecutive weeks atop the Australian Singles Chart. The song has received a platinum certification from the Australian Recording Industry Association (ARIA) for the shipment of 70,000 copies.

== Music video ==
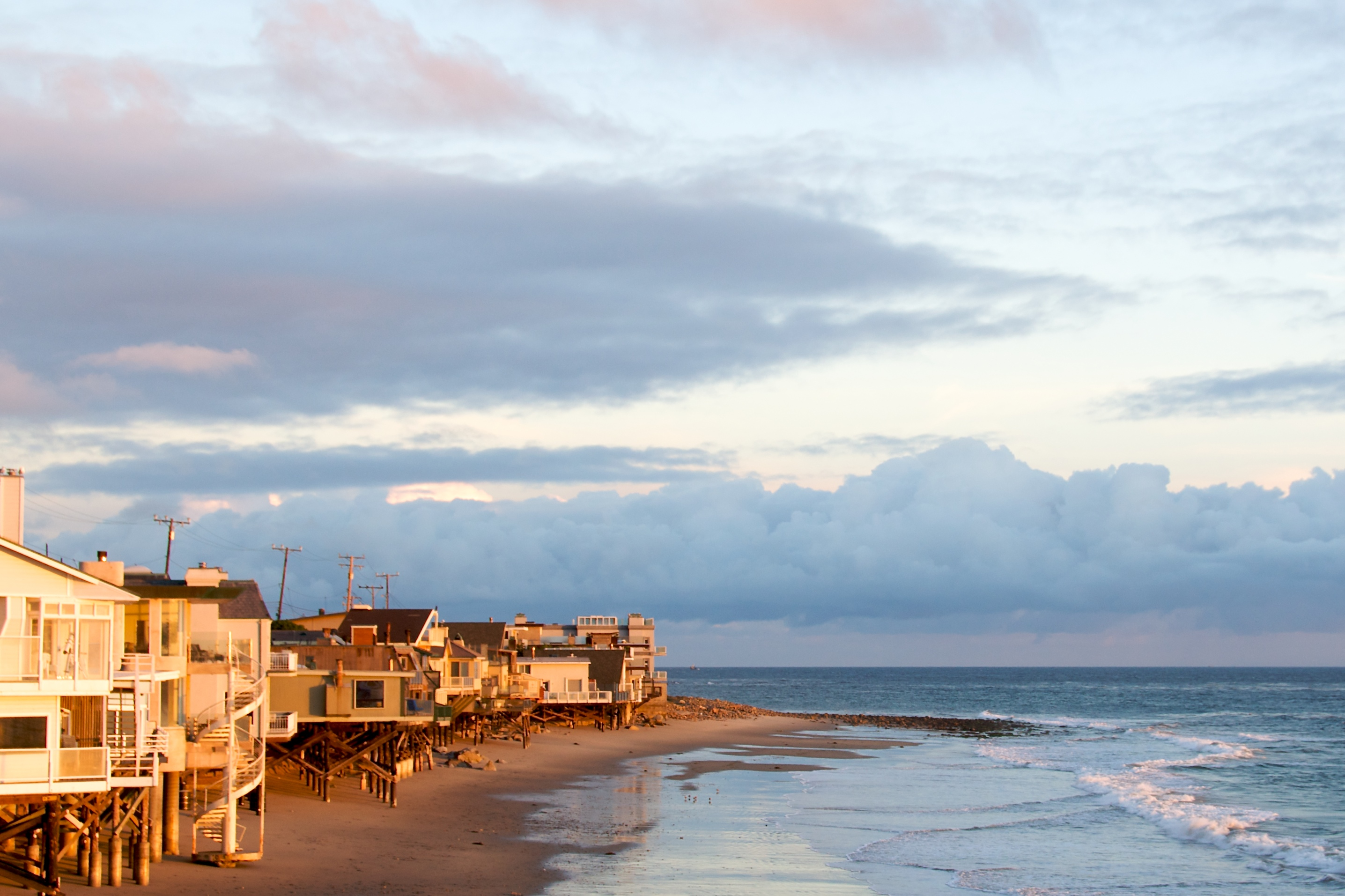
The song's music video was filmed on the beaches of Malibu, California.

The accompanying music videos for "You're Still the One" was directed by David Hogan. Twain explained to Hogan her initial vision of light as the main effect, and Hogan subsequently sent her photography books to choose lighting imagery and effects. Twain picked a dappled "dramatic" lighting, which Hogan "duplicated [...] perfectly". The music video for "You're Still the One" was shot in black-and-white in Malibu, California. Twain said the majority of the video was supposed to be shot on the beach. However, due to unfavorable weather conditions, several scenes were filmed in a beach house. The video features interspersed scenes of Twain on a beach and male model John Devoe in a beach house. Close-up shots of Twain show her singing on a beach at night, under the full moon. She is wearing a silk robe and has wet hair. Devoe is seen lounging in a bathtub and watching Twain on TV. Towards the end of the video, after he gets out of the tub, he takes off his towel and joins Twain in bed.

Brown complimented the "spectacular" contrast between outdoor and indoor scenes. He found it reminiscent of black-and-white romance films of the 1940s. Writing for NPR, Ann Powers described the music video as a "mix of beachy sensuality and technologically assisted intimacy" which she compared to Janet Jackson's "Love Will Never Do (Without You)" (1990) and Jennifer Lopez's "If You Had My Love" (1999). Scenes from the music video were deemed sexual and sparked controversy among conservative country music critics. Twain responded to these remarks as "totally ridiculous". She commented, "There is nothing revealing about it. I'm wrapped up to the gills. The video is sensual and has a surreal feel about it, but there is nothing sexual about it. When you start kissing and touching, it's sexual. But sensual? That's fine, in my opinion — it's a very romantic song". "You're Still the One" was the first music video by a country artist to be added to the U.S. MTV playlist. It won Best Country Clip at the 1998 Billboard Music Video Awards and was nominated for Best Female Video at the 1998 MTV Video Music Awards. This made Twain the first female country artist to be nominated for an MTV Video Music Award.

== Live performances ==
As part of the promotion of Come On Over, Twain performed the song on television shows including The Tonight Show with Jay Leno and The National Lottery Live. At the VH1 Divas concert on April 14, 1998, she sang "You're Still the One" and played guitar. On December 10, 1998, Twain performed the song at the Nobel Peace Prize Concert in Oslo, Norway. On the Come On Over Tour (1998–1999), Twain performed "You're Still the One" while playing a 12-string guitar and sitting on a bar stool. She was accompanied on stage by Elton John at the January 16, 1999 concert at the Bayfront Park Amphitheater in Miami, Florida. Their performance of "You're Still the One" and "Something About the Way You Look Tonight" (1997) was recorded for Twain's CBS TV special, Shania Twain's Winter Break, which premiered in March 1999. "You're Still the One" served as the opening song for the encore to the Up! Tour (2003–2004).

Twain sang "You're Still the One" on her 2012–2014 Las Vegas residency show, Shania: Still the One. She appeared on stage riding a white horse. Twain performed the song wearing a white cape and dress, standing barefoot on stage, and fondling the horse. During the performance, she circled the stage with the horse as confetti shaped like snowflakes fell from the sky. Billboard's Rae Votta wrote that the performance "[left] the crowd in awe both of the song and of the horse that somehow manages to be perfectly trained and perfectly natural all at once". Mike Weatherford of the Las Vegas Review-Journal compared the performance to those of Stevie Nicks, while Jon Caramanica of The New York Times said Twain's voice sounded "milky and resonant". On the Rock This Country Tour (2015), Twain performed an acoustic version of "You're Still the One", sitting on a stool and playing guitar.

On the final of the 12th season of America's Got Talent, Twain sang "You're Still the One" in duet with finalist Mandy Harvey. During the Now Tour (2018), Twain performed the song suspended above the audience and sitting on a guitar case-like swing. While reviewing the May 18, 2018 concert in Omaha, Nebraska, Kevin Coffey of the Omaha World-Herald praised Twain's vocal performance, writing: "She was able to fill the arena with her voice with seemingly little effort". At the 47th Annual American Music Awards on November 24, 2019, Twain sang "You're Still the One" as part of a hits medley, along with acoustic snippets of Post Malone's "Rockstar" (2017), Twenty One Pilots' "Stressed Out" (2015), Taylor Swift's "Shake It Off" (2014), and Drake's "God's Plan" (2018). "You're Still the One" was also part of the setlist of Twain's second Las Vegas residency show, Let's Go! (2019–2022), and the Queen of Me Tour (2023), where she performed it sitting on a stool and playing guitar.

== Cover versions and usage in media ==
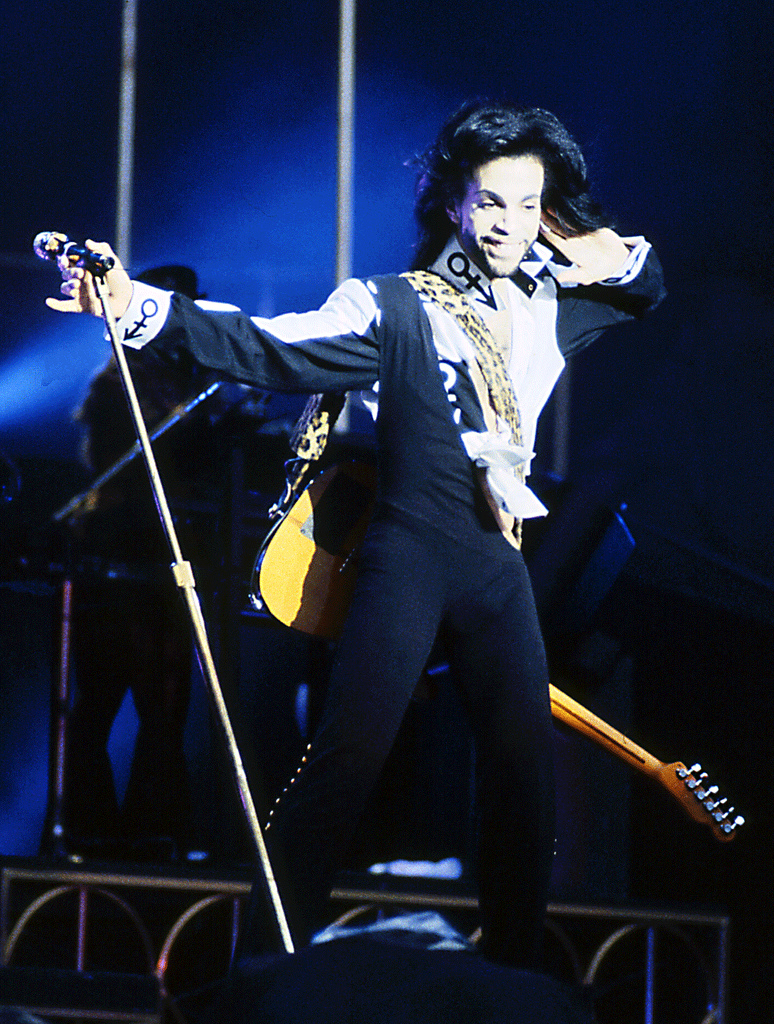
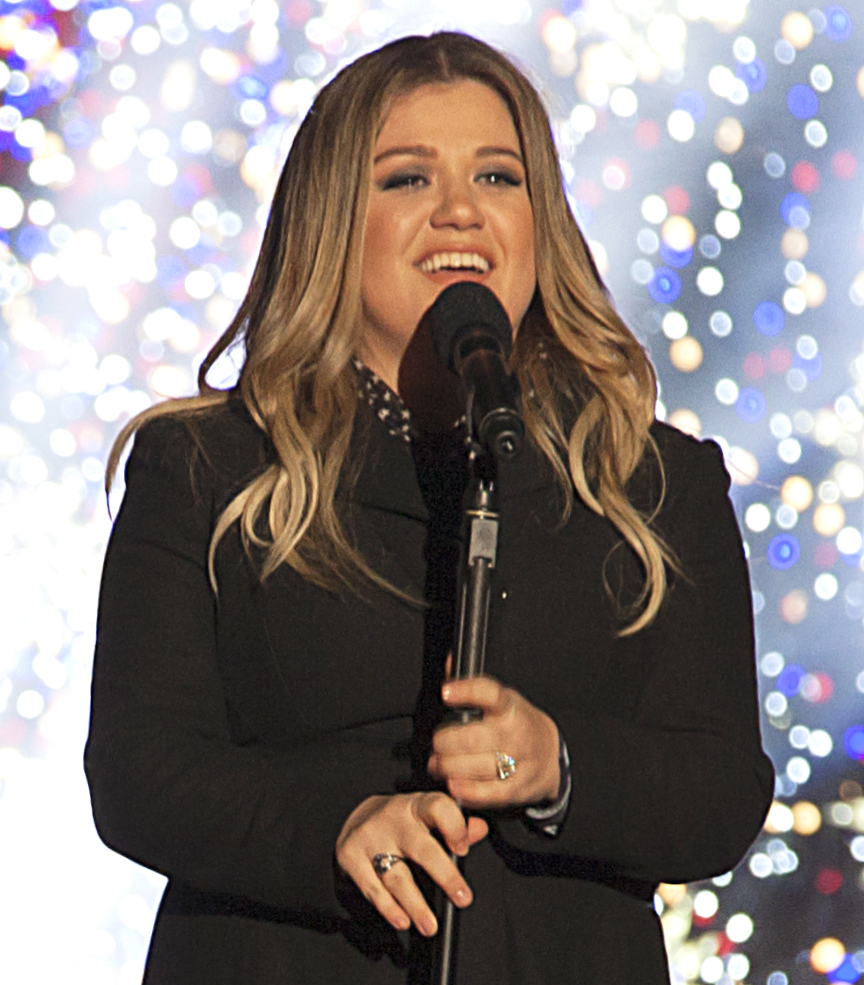
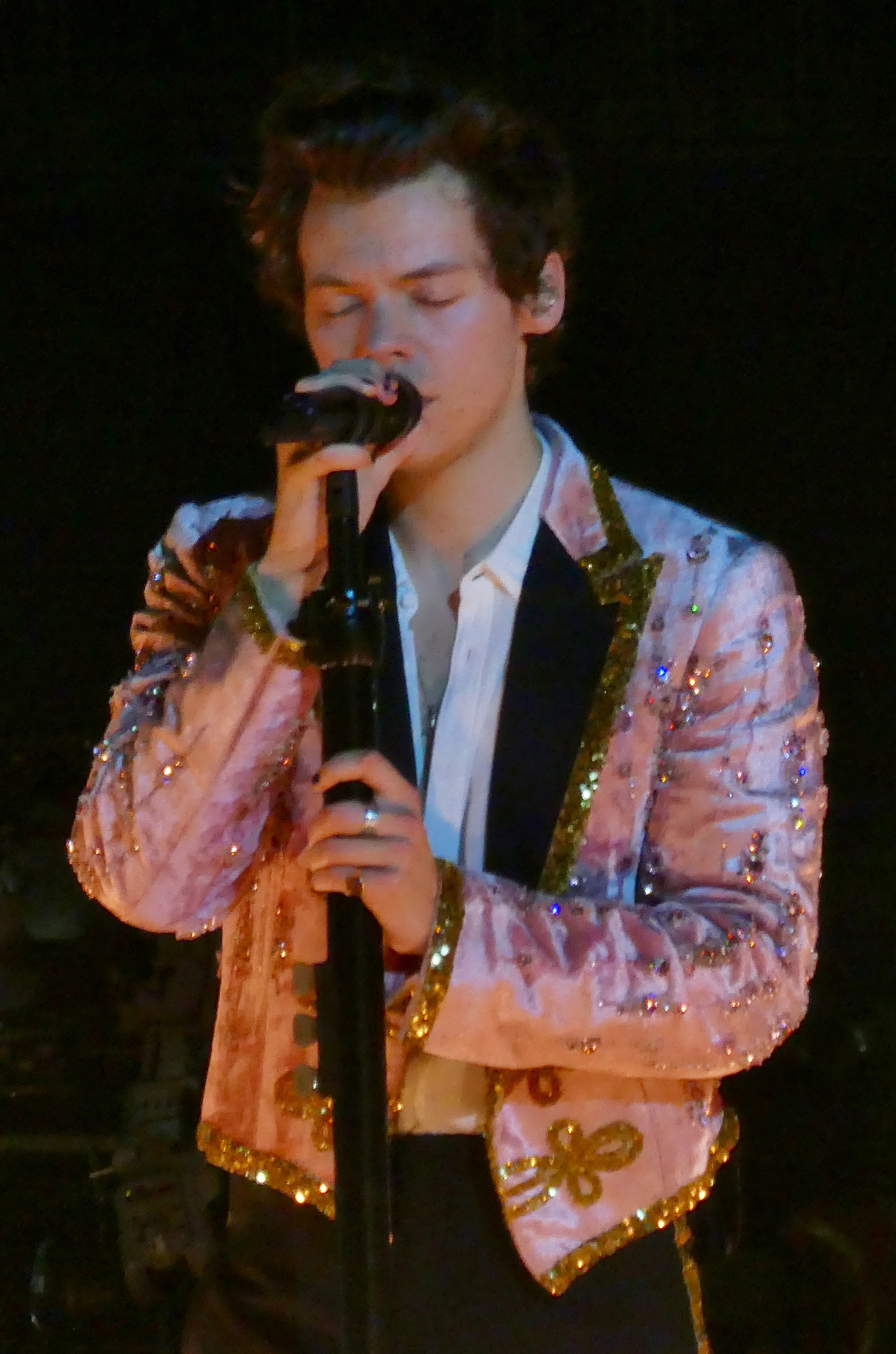
"You're Still the One" has been covered by artists such as Prince (left), Kelly Clarkson (middle), and Harry Styles (right).

In 1999, Prince recorded a cover of the song under the title "Ur'e Still the One" in duet with Marva King and uploaded it to his website Love4OneAnother.com. In retrospect, Twain praised Prince's cover in Steve Baltin's 2022 book Anthems We Love, saying: "It was very Prince-esque. [...] And that version made the most impact on me. I realized that, wow, really this song could live anywhere genrewise and style-wise". "You're Still the One" was featured on The Sopranos episode "Bust Out". Lee DeWyze performed the song for the Shania Twain week during the ninth season of American Idol. Kelly Clarkson covered the song during her 2012 Stronger Tour per fan request in Windsor, Ontario. On August 1, 2014, Brazilian singer Paula Fernandes released a duet version of "You're Still the One" with Twain. Including lyrics in both English and Portuguese, the duet was recorded in December 2013. The music video shows scenes of Twain and Fernandes in a recording studio and during rehearsals for Twain's Las Vegas residency show at the Caesars Palace.

Gretchen Parlato performed a jazz version of "You're Still the One" included on Otis Brown's III 2014 studio album, The Thought of You. At the 2016 CMT Artists of the Year Awards, Meghan Trainor covered the song as part of a medley performance in tribute to Twain. Her performance, along with Kelsea Ballerini's cover of "Any Man of Mine" and Jill Scott's rendition of "Man! I Feel Like a Woman!", received a nomination for Performance of the Year at the 2017 CMT Music Awards. American guitarist John Scofield recorded a jazz rendition of "You're Still the One" for his 2016 album Country for Old Men. John Fordham wrote in The Guardian that his cover "exhibits a tenderness caressed by Scofield's signature tonal creativity". Lady Antebellum included the song on the set list of their 2017 You Look Good World Tour. On June 22, 2018, during a concert at Madison Square Garden as part of his Harry Styles: Live on Tour (2017–2018), Harry Styles performed "You're Still the One" with Kacey Musgraves.

In October 2019, Teddy Swims uploaded a cover of "You're Still the One" on his YouTube account. As of 2023, it is his most-viewed video on the platform, garnering over 135 million views. He later released an official version produced by Dave Cobb in July 2020. In 2026, Swims's cover version was certified Platinum by Australian Recording Industry Association (ARIA), denoting 70,000 equivalent units.

Filipino actress and singer Vivoree Esclito uploaded a cover of the song in late 2019. The then-19-year-old's rendition received acclaim from netizens and amassed more than 12 million views by April 2020. Christian Lee Hutson and Julia Jacklin recorded a cover version of "You're Still the One" for the third volume of Hutson's cover EP series, The Version Suicides (2021). Rina Sawayama sang the track on her Hold the Girl Tour (2022–2023) on November 19, 2022, at the Hollywood Palladium, in Los Angeles. She performed the song again during a February 13, 2023 concert at Lafayette in London as part of Brits Week 2023. On January 17, 2023, Maple Glider released a folk rock rendition of "You're Still the One". To celebrate the release of Twain's sixth studio album, Queen of Me (2023), Tim McGraw shared a video on his Instagram account in February 2023 in which he sings an acoustic version of "You're Still The One", accompanied by guitarist Bob Minner. The song was included in the international soundtrack of Brazilian telenovela Corpo Dourado, as the theme song for lead characters Selena (Cristiana Oliveira) and Chico (Humberto Martins).

== Track listing and formats ==
- Canadian CD single
1. "You're Still the One" (radio edit with intro) – 3:36
2. "You're Still the One" (album version) – 3:32
3. "Don't Be Stupid (You Know I Love You)" (dance mix) – 4:45
- U.S. CD, 7-inch, and cassette single
1. "You're Still the One" (radio edit with intro) – 3:34
2. "Don't Be Stupid (You Know I Love You)" (remix) – 3:37
- U.S. maxi-CD single
1. "You're Still the One" (Soul Solution radio mix) – 4:03
2. "You're Still the One" (Soul Solution extended club mix) – 8:42
3. "You're Still the One" (Kano dub) – 7:46
4. "You're Still the One" (Soul Solution Percapella dance mix) – 3:34
5. "You're Still the One" (radio edit with intro) – 3:34
- U.K., Australian, and Japanese CD single
1. "You're Still the One" (radio edit without intro/single version) – 3:19
2. "(If You're Not in It for Love) I'm Outta Here!" (Mutt Lange mix) – 4:21
3. "You Win My Love" (Mutt Lange mix) – 3:54
4. "You're Still the One" (radio edit with intro/LP version) – 3:34
- U.K. cassette single and European CD single
1. "You're Still the One" (radio edit without intro/single version) – 3:19
2. "(If You're Not in It for Love) I'm Outta Here!" (Mutt Lange mix) – 4:21
- French limited-edition CD single
1. "You're Still the One" (single version) – 3:19
2. "You're Still the One" (Soul Solution dance mix) – 4:03
3. "You're Still the One" (video) – 3:19
4. "That Don't Impress Me Much" (video) – 3:38

== Credits and personnel ==
Credits are adapted from the liner notes of Come On Over (1997).

- Shania Twain – vocals, background vocals, songwriter
- Robert John "Mutt" Lange – producer, background vocals, songwriter
- John Hobbs – organ
- John Jarvis – acoustic piano
- Bruce Bouton – pedal steel, steel solo
- Eric Silver – mandolin
- Paul Leim – drums
- Jeff Balding – engineer
- Mark Hagen – assistant engineer
- Mike Shipley – mixing

== Charts ==
=== Weekly charts ===
1998–2001 weekly chart performance
Chart (1998–2001)	Peak position
Australia (ARIA)	1
Belgium (Ultratop 50 Flanders)	16
Canada Top Singles (RPM)	7
Canada Adult Contemporary (RPM)	1
Canada Country Singles (RPM)	1
Canada (Canadian Singles Chart)	2
Croatia International Airplay (Top lista)	5
Europe (European Hot 100 Singles)	25
Europe (European Radio Top 50)	12
France (SNEP)	51
Germany (GfK)	68
Hungary (Rádiós Top 40)	4
Iceland (Íslenski Listinn Topp 40)	19
Ireland (IRMA)	3
Netherlands (Dutch Top 40)	10
Netherlands (Single Top 100)	10
New Zealand (Recorded Music NZ)	9
Poland Airplay (Music & Media)	2
Scottish Singles Sales (Official Charts)	14
Spain (Radio Top 40)	24
Switzerland (Schweizer Hitparade)	26
UK Singles (Official Charts)	10
US Billboard Hot 100	2
US Adult Contemporary (Billboard)	1
US Adult Pop Airplay (Billboard)	6
US Dance Singles Sales (Billboard)	3
US Hot Country Songs (Billboard)	1
US Hot Latin Songs (Billboard)	37
US Pop Airplay (Billboard)	3
US Rhythmic Airplay (Billboard)	20
US Top Country Singles Sales (Billboard)	1

2026 weekly chart performance
Chart (2026)	Peak position
Latvia Airplay (TopHit)	25

=== Monthly charts ===
Monthly chart performance
Chart (2026)	Peak position
Latvia Airplay (TopHit)	45

=== Year-end charts ===
1998 year-end chart positions for "You're Still the One"
Chart (1998)	Position
Australia (ARIA)	9
Belgium (Ultratop 50 Flanders)	79
Canada Top Singles (RPM)	30
Canada Adult Contemporary (RPM)	10
Canada Country Tracks (RPM)	9
Netherlands (Dutch Top 40)	12
Netherlands (Single Top 100)	30
US Billboard Hot 100	3
US Adult Contemporary (Billboard)	2
US Adult Top 40 (Billboard)	19
US Hot Country Singles & Tracks (Billboard)	24
US Mainstream Top 40 (Billboard)	17
US Maxi-Singles Sales (Billboard)	3
US Rhythmic Top 40 (Billboard)	81

1999 year-end chart positions for "You're Still the One"
Chart (1999)	Position
US Adult Contemporary (Billboard)	13

2014 year-end chart positions for "You're Still the One"
Chart (2014)	Position
Brazil (Crowley) Duet with Paula Fernandes	56

=== Decade-end charts ===
1990s decade-end chart positions for "You're Still the One"
Chart (1990–1999)	Position
Netherlands (Dutch Top 40)	97
US Billboard Hot 100	34

=== All-time charts ===
All-time chart positions for "You're Still the One"
Chart (1958–2021)	Position
US Billboard Hot 100	94

== Certifications ==
Sales certifications for "You're Still the One"
Region	Certification	Certified units/sales
Australia (ARIA)	Platinum	70,000^{^}
Canada (Music Canada)	4× Platinum	320,000^{‡}
Denmark (IFPI Danmark)	Gold	45,000^{‡}
New Zealand (RMNZ)	3× Platinum	90,000^{‡}
Spain (Promusicae)	Gold	30,000^{‡}
United Kingdom (BPI)	2× Platinum	1,200,000^{‡}
United States (RIAA)	2× Platinum	2,000,000^{^}
^{^} Shipments figures based on certification alone.^{‡} Sales+streaming figures based on certification alone.

== Zedd remix ==
=== Charts ===
==== Weekly charts ====
Weekly chart performance
Chart (2026)	Peak position
Latvia Airplay (TopHit)	17

==== Monthly charts ====
Monthly chart performance
Chart (2026)	Peak position
Latvia Airplay (TopHit)	38

== Bibliography ==
- Baltin, Steve (2022). Anthems We Love. Harper Horizon. ISBN 978-0-7852-9053-7 – via Google Books.
- Brown, Jim (2000). Shania Twain: Still the One. Quarry Press Inc. ISBN 1-55082-269-1 – via Google Books.
- Williams, Dallas (1997). Shania Twain: On My Way. ECW Press. ISBN 1-55022-297X – via Google Books.
- Dickerson, James L. (2005). Go, girl, go!: the women's revolution in music. Schirmer Trade Books. ISBN 0-8256-7316-X. OL 8165296M.
- Eggar, Robin (2001). Shania Twain: The Biography. Headline Publishing Group. ISBN 0-7472-4786-2. OL 7959949M.
- Feldman, Christopher G. (2000). The Billboard Book of Number Two Singles. Billboard Books. ISBN 0-8230-7695-4. OL 8118583M.
- Gray, Scott (1998). On Her Way: The Shania Twain Story. Ballantine Books. ISBN 0-345-42936-2. OL 24875827M.
- Hughes, Michael (2000). "Country music as impression management: A meditation on fabricating authenticity". Poetics. 28 (2–3): 185–205. doi:10.1016/S0304-422X(00)00021-8.
- Mandrell, James (2014). "Shania Twain Shakes Up Country Music". The Journal of Popular Culture. 47 (5): 1015–1029. doi:10.1111/jpcu.12186. ISSN 1540-5931.
- McCall, Michael (1999). Shania Twain. St. Martin's Press. ISBN 0-312-20673-9. OL 21916846M.
- Kemp, Rob (2004). Brackett, Nathan; Hoard, Christian (eds.). The Rolling Stone Album Guide (4th ed.). Simon & Schuster. ISBN 0-7432-0169-8. OL 17734447W.
- Twain, Shania (2011). From This Moment On. Atria Publishing Group. ISBN 978-1-4516-2074-0. OL 25077206M.
- Shuker, Roy (2013). Understanding Popular Music Culture (4th ed.). Routledge. ISBN 978-0-415-51713-3 – via Google Books.
