= 2017 CMT Music Awards =

Annual US country music awards ceremony

- Date: June 7, 2017
- Location: Music City Center, Nashville, Tennessee
- Hosted by: Charles Esten

Highlights
- Most wins: Keith Urban (4)
- Most nominations: Keith Urban (4)

Television/radio coverage
- Network: CMT

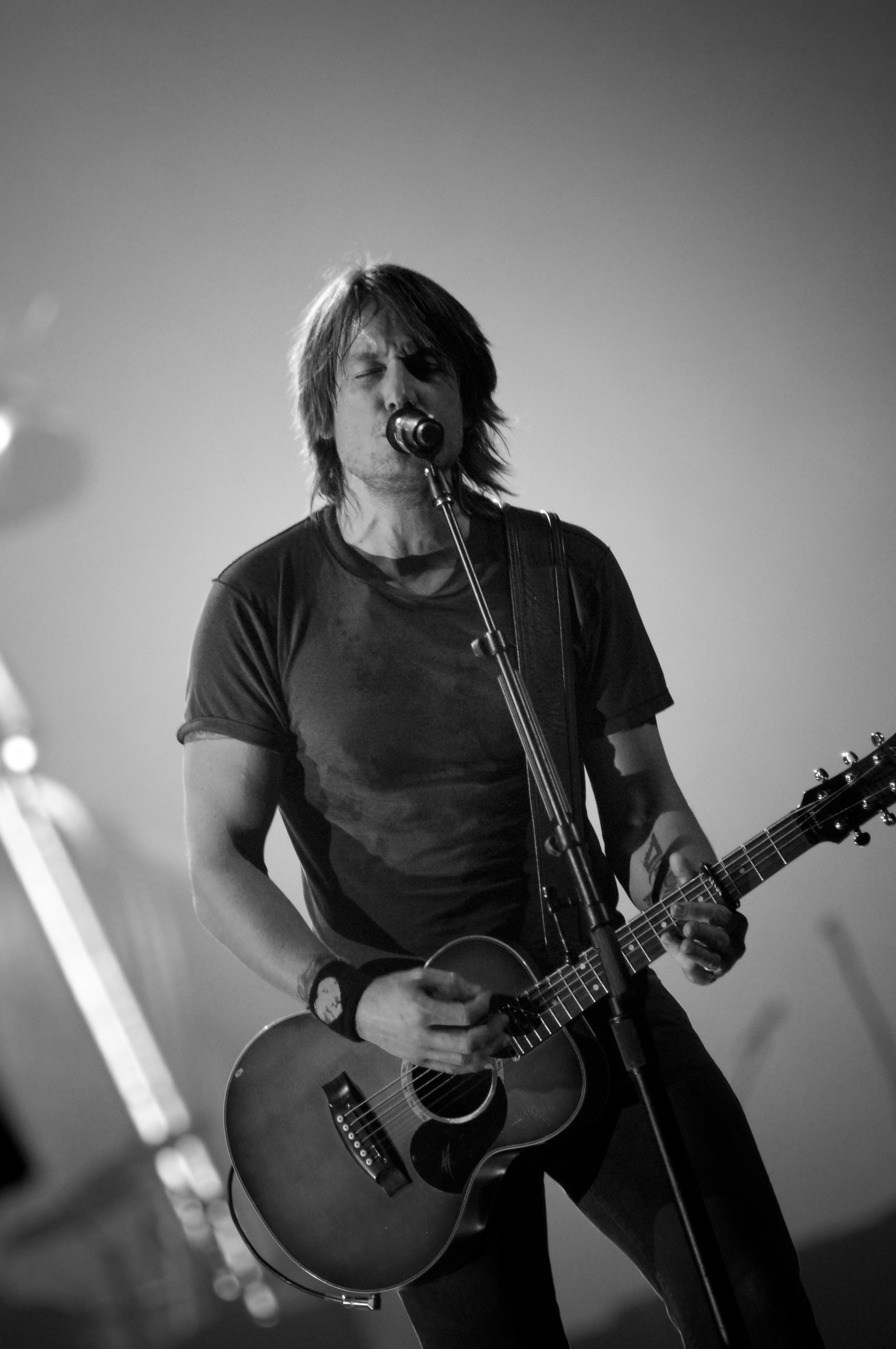
Video of the Year winner, Keith Urban

The 2017 CMT Music Awards were held at Music City Center in Nashville, Tennessee on June 7, 2017. Charles Esten was the host for the show. The CMT Music Awards are a fan-voted awards show for country music videos and television performances; Voting takes place on CMT's website.

== Winners and nominees ==
Nominees were announced on May 9, 2017. Winners are shown in bold.

Video of the Year	Female Video of the Year
**Keith Urban** — “**Blue Ain't Your Color**”; Carrie Underwood — “Church Bells”; Artists of Then, Now & Forever — “Forever Country”; Cole Swindell — “You Should Be Here”; Florida Georgia Line — “H.O.L.Y.”; Miranda Lambert — “Vice”	**Carrie Underwood** **— “Church Bells”**; Kelsea Ballerini — “Peter Pan”; Lauren Alaina — “Road Less Traveled”; Maren Morris — “80s Mercedes”; Reba McEntire — “Back to God”
Male Video of the Year	Group Video of the Year
**Keith Urban** — “**Blue Ain’t Your Color**”; Blake Shelton — “Came Here to Forget”; Eric Church — “Record Year”; Jason Aldean — “Lights Come On”; Luke Bryan — “Huntin’, Fishin’ and Lovin’ Every Day”; Thomas Rhett — “Star of the Show”	**Little Big Town — “Better Man”**; Eli Young Band — “Saltwater Gospel”; Lady Antebellum — “You Look Good”; Midland — “Drinkin’ Problem”; Old Dominion — “Song for Another Time”
Duo Video of the Year	Breakthrough Video of the Year
**Florida Georgia Line — “H.O.L.Y.”**; Big & Rich feat. Tim McGraw, “Lovin’ Lately”; Brothers Osborne, “21 Summer”; Dan + Shay, “How Not To”; LoCash, “I Know Somebody”	**Lauren Alaina — “Road Less Traveled”**; Brett Young, “In Case You Didn’t Know”; Jon Pardi, “Dirt on My Boots”; Kane Brown, “Used to Love You Sober”; Luke Combs, “Hurricane”; RaeLynn, “Love Triangle”
Collaborative Video of the Year	CMT Performance of the Year
**Keith Urban feat. Carrie Underwood — “The Fighter”**; Artists Then, Now & Forever — “Forever Country”; Chris Young feat. Vince Gill — “Sober Saturday Night”; Dierks Bentley and Elle King — “Different for Girls”; Florida Georgia Line feat. Tim McGraw — “May We All”; Kenny Chesney feat. Pink — “Setting the World on Fire”	From CMT Crossroads: **Jason Derulo** **and Luke Bryan — “Want to Want Me"**; From CMT Concert of the Summer: Jason Aldean — “Hicktown; From CMT Crossroads: John Mellencamp and Darius Rucker — “Pink Houses"; From CMT Crossroads: Alicia Keys and Maren Morris — “’80s Mercedes"; From CMT Artists of the Year: Meghan Trainor, Jill Scott and Kelsea Ballerini — “You're Still the One / Any Man of Mine / Man! I Feel Like a Woman!; From CMT Crossroads: Nick Jonas and Thomas Rhett — “Close"
Social Superstar
**Keith Urban**; Brett Eldredge; Jake Owen; Kelsea Ballerini; Lauren Alaina; Thomas Rhett
