= Time of Our Lives (residency) =

Concert residency by Pitbull

- Residency by Pitbull
- Location: Paradise, Nevada, U.S.
- Venue: The AXIS
- Start date: September 23, 2015
- End date: May 25, 2019
- Legs: 7
- No. of shows: 44

Pitbull concert chronology
- Enrique Iglesias and Pitbull Live (2017); Time of Our Lives (2015–2019)

Time of Our Lives was a concert residency by American rapper Pitbull. Held at The AXIS on the Las Vegas Strip in Paradise, Nevada, the show opened on September 23, 2015 and closed on May 25, 2019, spanning five years and 44 shows.

== Shows ==
List of 2015 performances
Date	Attendance	Revenue
September 23, 2015	—N/a	—N/a
September 25, 2015	—N/a	—N/a
September 26, 2015	—N/a	—N/a
September 30, 2015	—N/a	—N/a
October 2, 2015	—N/a	—N/a
October 3, 2015	—N/a	—N/a
October 7, 2015	—N/a	—N/a

List of 2016 performances
Date	Attendance	Revenue
March 16, 2016	—N/a	—N/a
March 18, 2016	—N/a	—N/a
March 19, 2016	—N/a	—N/a
March 23, 2016	—N/a	—N/a
March 25, 2016	—N/a	—N/a
March 26, 2016	—N/a	—N/a
September 15, 2016	—N/a	—N/a
September 16, 2016	—N/a	—N/a

List of 2017 performances
Date	Attendance	Revenue
July 21, 2017	—N/a	—N/a
July 22, 2017	—N/a	—N/a
July 26, 2017	—N/a	—N/a
July 28, 2017	—N/a	—N/a
July 29, 2017	—N/a	—N/a
August 2, 2017	—N/a	—N/a
August 4, 2017	—N/a	—N/a
August 5, 2017	—N/a	—N/a

List of 2018 performances
Date	Attendance	Revenue
January 17, 2018	—N/a	—N/a
January 19, 2018	—N/a	—N/a
January 20, 2018	—N/a	—N/a
January 24, 2018	—N/a	—N/a
January 27, 2018	—N/a	—N/a
April 27, 2018	—N/a	—N/a
April 28, 2018	—N/a	—N/a
May 2, 2018	—N/a	—N/a
May 4, 2018	—N/a	—N/a
May 5, 2018	—N/a	—N/a
May 9, 2018	—N/a	—N/a
May 11, 2018	—N/a	—N/a
May 12, 2018	—N/a	—N/a

List of 2019 performances
Date	Attendance	Revenue
May 10, 2019	—N/a	—N/a
May 11, 2019	—N/a	—N/a
May 15, 2019	—N/a	—N/a
May 17, 2019	—N/a	—N/a
May 18, 2019	—N/a	—N/a
May 22, 2019	—N/a	—N/a
May 24, 2019	—N/a	—N/a
May 25, 2019	—N/a	—N/a
