= PH Live =

Theater in Paradise, Nevada, United States

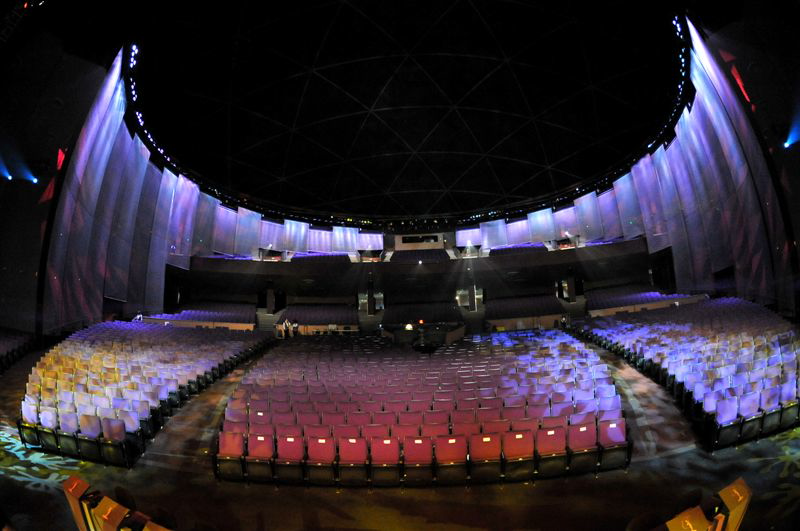
- Interior of the theatre in 2009, as seen from the stage

- Location in Nevada Location in the United States Location in North America
- Interactive map of PH Live
- Former names: Aladdin Theatre for the Performing Arts (1976–2006); Theatre for the Performing Arts (2006–2007); Planet Hollywood Theatre for the Performing Arts (2007–2012); PH Live (2012–2013 and 2024–present); The AXIS (2013–2018); Zappos Theater (2018–2023); Bakkt Theater (2023–2024)
- Address: 3667 South Las Vegas Boulevard
- Location: Paradise, Nevada, U.S.
- Coordinates: 36.1099°N 115.1701°W
- Owner: Caesars Entertainment
- Operator: Live Nation
- Capacity: 7,000; 4,600 (concert residencies)

Construction
- Groundbreaking: 1972; 54 years ago
- Opened: July 2, 1976; 50 years ago
- Renovated: 2000; 2012–13
- Closed: 1998–2000
- Cost: $4 million ($30.8 million in 2025 dollars)

Website
- Venue Website

PH Live is a mid-sized auditorium in the Planet Hollywood Las Vegas hotel and casino on the Las Vegas Strip in Paradise, Nevada, United States. The venue hosts events including charity benefits, concerts and award shows including beauty pageants such as Miss Universe, Miss USA and Miss Teen USA.

The venue was named Aladdin Theatre for the Performing Arts from its opening in 1976 until 2006, Theatre for the Performing Arts from 2006 until 2007, Planet Hollywood Theatre for the Performing Arts from 2007 until June 2012, PH Live at Planet Hollywood Resort & Casino from June 2012 to December 2013, The AXIS at Planet Hollywood Resort & Casino from December 2013 to February 2018, Zappos Theater from February 2018 to March 2023, Bakkt Theater from March 2023 to August 2024, and PH Live since August 2024.

== History ==
While this location was known as the Aladdin Hotel, the owners decided to create a performing arts center to replace the mildly used golf course. Planning began in 1969, with concepts showing the venue as a separate building. In 1972, the hotel was sold to Sam Diamond, Peter Wevve, Sorkis Wevve and Richard Daly.

The theater opened on July 2, 1976 (America's bicentennial weekend), with Neil Diamond, who was paid $750,000 for five sold-out shows. During the 1970s and 1980s, the auditorium became a staple on the Strip for many rock and roll acts.

In September 1977, Frank Zappa's road manager was found dead of self-inflicted razor-blade wounds after a performance at the venue.

In November 1997, at the final performance at the venue before it closed for renovations, Mötley Crüe invited fans onto the stage, resulting in a flying chairs and signs ripped from walls. Guitarist Mick Mars was knocked out in the melee. Tommy Lee invited women to flash a video camera.

In 1998, the original Aladdin Hotel was imploded. During the renovation, the center's original structure was removed, incorporating the venue into the casino area of the hotel. In 2000, the venue reopened with a performance by Enrique Iglesias, with a capacity decrease to 7,000.

Due to new competition from the MGM Grand Garden Arena and Mandalay Bay Events Center, the venue was used infrequently by music acts.

In 2004, spectators walked out of a Linda Ronstadt concert and some defaced posters of Ronstadt in the lobby after she expressed support for documentary filmmaker Michael Moore. Ronstadt was then banned from the venue.

The theater was the host of the Miss Universe 1991, 1996, 2012, 2015 and 2017 pageants, several Miss USA pageants and several Miss America pageants.

In December 2013, Live Nation Entertainment took over operations and management of the venue from BASE Entertainment.

== Notable events ==
- Miss Universe (1991, 1996, 2012, 2015, 2017)
- Miss America (2006–13)
- So You Think You Can Dance Vegas Week (2006, 2008–2013)
- Justin Timberlake & Friends (2007–2012)
- America's Got Talent Vegas Week (2007–2008, 2011, 2013)
- Miss USA (2008–13)
- Paris By Night (2009–2015, 2017-2019, 2022)
- The Game Awards (2014)
- Jimmy Kimmel Live! (April 2019)
- NFL draft (2023)

=== Concert residencies ===
The theatre has hosted concert residencies and limited concert engagements by artists including Britney Spears, Pitbull, Jennifer Lopez, Lionel Richie, Backstreet Boys, Gwen Stefani, Christina Aguilera, Shania Twain, John Legend, Miranda Lambert, Keith Urban, Kelly Clarkson, Scorpions, 50 Cent, Jeezy, John Fogerty and Old Dominion.

Concert residencies and limited concert engagements at PH Live
Performer	Title	Dates	Shows	Notes
Britney Spears	Britney: Piece of Me	December 27, 2013– December 31, 2017	248	The residency concluded on New Year's Eve 2017.
Pitbull	Time of Our Lives	September 23, 2015– May 25, 2019	44	The residency ran through multiple return engagements between 2015 and 2019.
Jennifer Lopez	Jennifer Lopez: All I Have	January 20, 2016– September 29, 2018	121	Lopez's first Las Vegas residency grossed more than $100 million.
Lionel Richie	Lionel Richie – All the Hits	April 27, 2016– October 20, 2018	—N/a	The residency opened in 2016 and was later extended with additional dates in 2017 and 2018.
Backstreet Boys	Backstreet Boys: Larger Than Life	March 1, 2017– April 27, 2019	80	The residency concluded before the group began its DNA World Tour.
Gwen Stefani	Gwen Stefani – Just a Girl	June 27, 2018– November 6, 2021	57	Final performances were held in October and November 2021.
Florida Georgia Line	Live From Las Vegas	December 1, 2018– November 12, 2019	9	The engagement opened with five shows in December 2018 and was later extended with four additional dates in November 2019.
Def Leppard	Def Leppard Hits Vegas: The Sin City Residency	August 14, 2019– September 7, 2019	12	The residency was held at Zappos Theater.
Christina Aguilera	Christina Aguilera: The Xperience	May 31, 2019– March 7, 2020	24	Additional March 2020 performances were cancelled due to the COVID-19 pandemic.
Shania Twain	Let's Go!	December 6, 2019– September 10, 2022	38	The residency was suspended in March 2020 due to the COVID-19 pandemic and resumed in December 2021.
Scorpions	Sin City Nights	March 26, 2022– April 16, 2022	9	Originally scheduled for 2020, postponed to 2021, then rescheduled to 2022 due to the COVID-19 pandemic.
John Legend	Love in Las Vegas	April 22, 2022– October 29, 2022	24	The residency was designed exclusively for Zappos Theater.
The Doobie Brothers	The Doobie Brothers	May 13, 2022– May 28, 2022	8	Exclusive Las Vegas limited engagement at Zappos Theater.
Miranda Lambert	Velvet Rodeo	September 23, 2022– April 6, 2024	48	The residency concluded on April 6, 2024.
Keith Urban	Keith Urban: The Las Vegas Residency	March 3, 2023– November 18, 2023	24	The residency was extended with eight additional November 2023 dates.
The Chicks	Six Nights in Vegas	May 3, 2023– May 13, 2023	6	Limited six-show engagement at Zappos Theater.
Kelly Clarkson	Chemistry: An Intimate Evening with Kelly Clarkson	July 28, 2023– February 10, 2024	14	The original ten-show engagement was extended with four additional performances.
Van Morrison	Van Morrison	September 6, 2023– September 9, 2023	3	Three-night run at Zappos Theater.
Scorpions	Scorpions – Love at First Sting Las Vegas	April 11, 2024– May 3, 2024	9	Residency celebrating the 40th anniversary of Love at First Sting.
Shania Twain	Come On Over - All The Hits	May 10, 2024– February 8, 2025	33	The final nine performances were added for January and February 2025.
50 Cent	50 Cent: In Da Club	December 27, 2024– January 4, 2025	6	Six-show residency at PH Live, including a New Year's Eve performance.
Scorpions	Coming Home to Las Vegas	August 14, 2025– August 23, 2025	5	Originally scheduled for February and March 2025, the residency was postponed to August 2025 while drummer Mikkey Dee recovered from a health issue.
Jeezy	TM:101 Live	October 31, 2025– December 21, 2025	4	Orchestra-backed residency celebrating the 20th anniversary of Let's Get It: Thug Motivation 101.
John Fogerty	John Fogerty: Live in Las Vegas	December 31, 2025– March 21, 2026	7	Exclusive PH Live engagement with performances over New Year's week and March 2026.
Jeezy	The Legend of the Snowman	May 1, 2026– August 22, 2026	21 (scheduled)	Ongoing residency as of June 2026. The run was expanded with additional dates after its opening weekend.

Events and tenants
Preceded by Shubert Theatre ( (United States) Century City, CA); Windhoek Country Club Resort ( (Namibia) Windhoek); Credicard Hall ( (Brazil) São Paulo); FIU Arena ( (United States) Miami, FL); Mall of Asia Arena ( (Philippines) Pasay)	Miss Universe venue 1991; 1996; 2012; 2015; 2017	Succeeded by Queen Sirikit National Convention Center ( (Thailand) Bangkok); Miami Beach Convention Center ( (United States) Florida); Crocus City Hall ( (Russia) Moscow); SM Mall of Asia Arena ( (Philippines) Pasay); Impact Arena ( (Thailand) Bangkok)
Preceded by Boardwalk Hall	Miss America venue 2006–2013	Succeeded by Boardwalk Hall
Preceded by Kodak Theatre	Miss USA venue 2008–2013	Succeeded by Baton Rouge River Center
