= Queen of Me =

2023 studio album by Shania Twain

Studio album by Shania Twain
- Released: February 3, 2023
- Recorded: April 2021–February 2022
- Studios: 8 World; One Eyed Jack's; Republic; Messinger Sounds; Whatchutalkinbout; Club Ralph; LBT
- Genres: Country; pop
- Length: 36:20
- Label: Republic
- Producers: Mark Crew; Tyler Joseph; Adam Messinger; Daniel Priddy; Mark Ralph; David Stewart; Shania Twain

Shania Twain chronology
Not Just a Girl (The Highlights) (2022)	Queen of Me (2023)	Little Miss Twain (2026)

Singles from Queen of Me
- 1. "Waking Up Dreaming" Released: September 23, 2022; 2. "Giddy Up!" Released: January 5, 2023

Queen of Me is the sixth studio album by the Canadian singer and songwriter Shania Twain. The album was released on February 3, 2023, by Republic Records. It is her first album since Now (2017), and is her first to not be released with her previous label of 31 years, Mercury Nashville. The album was promoted with the release of two singles and a promotional single: "Waking Up Dreaming", "Last Day of Summer", and "Giddy Up!". Commercially, the album became her third number one album in the United Kingdom, and entered the top ten in Canada, Switzerland, Australia and the United States.

== Background ==
In 2022, Twain's Netflix documentary, Not Just a Girl, was released which documented her career to date as well as documenting some of the recording for her forthcoming sixth studio album. Tracks previewed in the documentary include "Inhale/Exhale Air" and "Queen of Me".

== Singles ==
Twain released "Waking Up Dreaming", the album's lead single on September 23, 2022, following its premiere on BBC Radio 2. A music video for the song, directed by Isaac Rentz, was released on the same day.

"Last Day of Summer", co-written with Jack Savoretti was released as the album's first promotional single on October 28, 2022, along with a lyric video.

The second single, "Giddy Up!" was released on January 5, 2023.

== Promotion ==
On October 28, 2022, she announced that she would embark on her Queen of Me Tour to promote the album, which is scheduled to begin in Spokane on April 28, 2023, and will end on November 14, in Vancouver, encompassing 76 dates.

On December 5, 2022, Twain performed the lead single, "Waking Up Dreaming" during a medley of her hits at the 48th People's Choice Awards. She later performed it on the British Television Talent Series Starstruck on April 1, 2023.

Twain also promoted the album through her appearances on The Late Show with Stephen Colbert on January 5, 2023, and The Kelly Clarkson Show and The Late Late Show with James Corden on February 2, 2023.

== Critical reception ==
Professional ratings
Aggregate scores
Source	Rating
Metacritic	61/100
Review scores
Source	Rating
AllMusic	2.5/5 stars
Evening Standard	3/5 stars
Idobi Radio	A
Irish Examiner	4/5 stars
The Irish News	8/10
The Line of Best Fit	6/10
Pitchfork	5.2/10
Riff Magazine	9/10
The Sydney Morning Herald	3.5/5 stars
The Telegraph	3/5 stars

On review aggregator Metacritic, Queen of Me received a score of 61 out of 100 based on nine reviews, indicating "generally favorable reviews". Imy Brighty-Potts of The Irish News wrote that "the record is a tour of all the best country sounds and tropes climbing the charts over the past few years – with Shania delivering powerful vocals despite undergoing open-throat surgery a few years ago." According to Ed Power of the Irish Examiner, "the 'Shania-issance' is in full swing", describing the album as "unashamedly pop" yet "Twain’s country roots are not entirely obscured". Allison Hussey of Pitchfork described the album as "a dozen tracks of optimistic affirmations and pumping electro-pop rhythms", but found the material "ill-suited to Twain's voice" and the lyrics rife with "forcibly modern idioms", concluding that Queen of Me "tries so hard to capture current trends that it already sounds behind the times". Billy Dukes of Taste of Country summarized that the album "feasts on contagious hooks and repetition", while Jon Freeman of Rolling Stone defined it as "an uplifting statement about being your own champion in the present". Annabel Ross of The Sydney Morning Herald wrote that Twain is "back to her poppy, peppy self... maintaining an upbeat vibe throughout." Piper Westrom of Riff Magazine wrote, "Queen of Me is everything fans of Shania Twain could hope for. At the same time, it's a perfect introduction for anyone who's not heard her to this point. Twain is making music that is fun, and she is having fun doing it."

In a more critical review of the album for AllMusic, Stephen Thomas Erlewine claimed that, "There's no question that she's game -- she throws herself into the songs, not hesitating when "Pretty Liar" calls for her to curse—and her spirits are so high they nearly counter the cacophonic cheer of the production. Nevertheless, the end results feel curiously constrained, as if Twain was dancing in front of a mirror instead of underneath a mirrorball."

== Commercial performance ==
In Canada, Queen of Me debuted at number two on the Canadian Album Chart, becoming her sixth top-ten album on the chart and seventh overall in the country.

In the United States, the album debuted at number 10 on the US Billboard 200, earning 38,000 equivalent album units, with 34,000 of those being album sales, becoming Twain's sixth top-ten album in the country. She joins Madonna and Mariah Carey as the only women with newly-charting Billboard 200 top 10s in the 1990s, 2000s, ’10s and ’20s (Madonna's streak also includes the ’80s). The album also debuted on the Billboard Top Country Albums chart at No. 2, earning Twain her seventh top-five entry on the chart.

In the United Kingdom, Queen of Me debuted atop the UK Albums Chart, becoming her third number one album in the country. Elsewhere, Queen of Me peaked within the top five in Australia and Switzerland, and charted in seven additional countries.

== Track listing ==
Queen of Me – Standard edition
No.	Title	Writer(s)	Producer(s)	Length
1.	"Giddy Up!"	Shania Twain; Samuel Romans; Jessica Agombar; David Stewart	Stewart	2:42
2.	"Brand New"	Twain; Wayne Hector; Mark Crew; Dan Priddy	Crew; Priddy	2:33
3.	"Waking Up Dreaming"	Twain; Agombar; Stewart	Stewart	3:18
4.	"Best Friend"	Twain; Tom Mann; Crew; Priddy	Crew; Priddy	2:39
5.	"Pretty Liar"	Twain; Adam Messinger	Messinger; Mark Ralph^{[a]}	2:39
6.	"Inhale/Exhale Air"	Twain; Iain Archer; Ralph	Ralph	3:18
7.	"Last Day of Summer"	Twain; Jack Savoretti; Ralph	Ralph	3:10
8.	"Queen of Me"	Twain; Messinger	Messinger	2:58
9.	"Got It Good"	Twain; Georgia Barnes; Ralph	Ralph	2:53
10.	"Number One"	Twain; Eja Lange; Ralph	Twain; Ralph	3:21
11.	"Not Just a Girl"	Twain; Hector; Ralph	Ralph	3:10
12.	"The Hardest Stone"	Twain; Tyler Joseph	Joseph; Paul Meany^{[c]}; Ralph^{[a]}	3:39
Total length:				36:20

Queen of Me – Target, HMV, and JPC CD bonus tracks
No.	Title	Writer(s)	Producer(s)	Length
13.	"On Three"	Twain	Simone Felice; David Baron	2:39
14.	"Done & Dusted"	Twain	Dave Cobb	2:58
Total length:				41:57

Queen of Me – Royal Edition
No.	Title	Writer(s)	Producer(s)	Length
13.	"Bone Dry"	Twain; Felice; Baron	Twain; Felice; Baron	3:25
14.	"Wanted Man"	Twain	Twain	2:46
15.	"Inhale/Exhale Air" (featuring Breland)	Twain; Archer; Ralph	Ralph	3:19
16.	"Queen of Me" (acoustic version)	Twain; Messinger	Ralph	2:34
17.	"Giddy Up!" (Malibu Babie remix)	Twain; Romans; Agombar; Stewart	Stewart; Malibu Babie^{[a]}	2:44
Total length:				51:16

=== Notes ===
- ^{^[c]} signifies a co-producer
- ^{^[a]} signifies an additional producer
- An extended version of the Royal edition includes the Target bonus tracks before the Royal edition bonus material.

== Personnel ==
Credits are adapted from the album's liner notes and Tidal. Track numbers refer to the Royal Edition Extended Version of the album.

=== Performance ===
- Brian Allen – bass guitar (14)
- Iain Archer – guitar (6, 17)
- David Baron – baritone saxophone (13), celesta (13), drum programming (13), Hammond B3 (13), piano (15), synthesizer (15)
- Breland – vocals (17)
- Larry Campbell – acoustic guitar (13, 15), banjo (13), electric guitar (13, 15), violin (13, 15), mandolin (15)
- Dave Cobb – electric guitar (14), guitar (14)
- Mark Crew – keyboards (2, 4), programming (2, 4)
- Billy Ray Cyrus – background vocals (13)
- Snake Davis – saxophone (1, 19)
- James Felice – accordion (15)
- Simone Felice – drum programming (13), handclaps (13), tambourine (13, 15), drums (15)
- Abi Flynn – background vocals (6–8, 10, 11, 17)
- Wayne Hector – background vocals (11)
- Tyler Joseph – background vocals (12)
- Byron Isaacs – acoustic bass guitar (13, 15)
- Michael Logan – background vocals (8), keyboards (16)
- Malibu Barbie – remixing (19)
- Tom Mann – guitar (4)
- Adam Messinger – programming (5, 8), background vocals (8)
- Steve Milbourne – electric guitar (13), acoustic guitar (15)
- Ray Parker Jr. – background vocals (8)
- Chris Powell – drums (14), handclaps (14), shaker (14), spoons (14)
- Leroy Powell – electric guitar (14)
- Dan Priddy – background vocals (2, 4), guitar (4), keyboards (2, 4), programming (2, 4)
- Mark Ralph – acoustic guitar (18), bass guitar (6, 7, 10, 11, 17), electric guitar (18), guitar (6, 7, 10, 11, 17), keyboards (5–7, 10, 11, 17), percussion (5–7, 10, 11, 17), programming (5–8, 10, 11, 17)
- Alex Reeves – drums (13)
- Jack Savoretti – background vocals (7)
- Donnell Spencer Jr. – background vocals (8), drums (16)
- David Stewart – acoustic guitar (1, 3, 19), background vocals (1, 3, 19), bass guitar (1, 3, 19), bass synthesizer (1, 3, 19), drum programming (1, 3, 19), drums (1, 3, 19), electric guitar (1, 3, 19), keyboards (1, 3, 19), percussion (1, 3, 19), synthesizers (1, 3, 19)
- Johnny Thirkell – trumpet (1, 19)
- Darrell Thorp – drum programming (14)
- Shania Twain – vocals (13)
- Tom Walsh – trumpet (1, 19)
- Fred Washington – background vocals (8), bass guitar (16)
- Dennis White – drum programming (6–8, 10, 11, 17), drums (6–8, 11, 17), percussion (6, 7, 10, 11, 17), programming (8)
- Tom White – trombone (1, 19)

=== Production ===
- David Baron – engineer (13, 15)
- Milan Beker – engineer (3)
- Bryce Bordone – mixing assistant (1)
- Gemma Chester – engineer (17), engineering assistant (6, 7, 9–11)
- Matt Colton – mastering (2, 4–14, 17, 18)
- Mark Crew – engineer (2, 4)
- Simon Francis – mastering (16)
- Serban Ghenea – mixing (1)
- Clint Gibbs – mixing (19)
- Josh Green – engineer (6, 7, 9–11, 17)
- Renée Hikari – engineer (13), engineering assistant (15)
- Jonathan Hucks – engineer (1, 3, 19)
- Tyler Joseph – vocal engineering (12)
- Randy Merrill – mastering (1, 3)
- Adam Messinger – vocal engineering (5, 8)
- Sean Phelan – engineer (1, 3, 19)
- Mark Ralph – mixing (2, 4–12, 15, 17, 18), vocal engineering (10)
- Olle Romo – vocal engineering programming (5, 8, 10), vocal engineering (12)
- Mark "Spike" Stent – mixing (3, 13, 14, 16)
- Darrell Thorp – engineer (14)
- Matt Wolach – mixing assistant (13, 14)

=== Other personnel ===
- Louie Banks – photography
- Jerry Heiden – package design

== Charts ==
=== Weekly charts ===
Chart (2023)	Peak position
Australian Albums (ARIA)	5
Australian Country Albums (ARIA)	1
Austrian Albums (Ö3 Austria)	19
Belgian Albums (Ultratop Flanders)	26
Belgian Albums (Ultratop Wallonia)	23
Canadian Albums (Billboard)	2
Dutch Albums (Album Top 100)	53
French Albums (SNEP)	96
German Albums (Offizielle Top 100)	13
Irish Albums (Official Charts)	15
Scottish Albums (Official Charts)	1
Spanish Albums (Promusicae)	77
Swiss Albums (Schweizer Hitparade)	2
UK Albums (Official Charts)	1
US Billboard 200	10
US Top Country Albums (Billboard)	2

=== Year-end charts ===
Chart (2023)	Position
Australian Country Albums (ARIA)	34
Canadian Albums (Billboard)	189
US Top Country Albums (Billboard)	78

== Sales ==
Sales figures for "Queen of Me"
Region	Certification	Certified units/sales
United Kingdom	—	44,552
