= Let's Go! (residency) =

Concert residency by Shania Twain

- Residency by Shania Twain
- Promotional poster for the residency
- Location: Paradise, Nevada, U.S.
- Venue: Zappos Theater
- Start date: December 6, 2019
- End date: September 10, 2022
- Legs: 6
- No. of shows: 38
- Box office: US $12 million

Shania Twain concert chronology
- Now Tour (2018); Let's Go! (2019–22); Queen of Me Tour (2023)

Let's Go! is the second concert residency by Canadian singer Shania Twain. Performed at the Zappos Theater on the Las Vegas Strip in Paradise, Nevada, the show began on December 6, 2019, and was originally estimated to run through 2021. However, due to the COVID-19 pandemic, the show was put on hold and resumed in December 2021, concluding on September 10, 2022 with 38 shows across 6 legs.

== Background ==
Prior to the residency, Twain spent two years performing the Shania: Still the One residency at Caesars Palace from December 2012 until the end of 2014, and embarked on her 2015 Rock This Country Tour and her 2018 Now Tour. In March 2019, during an interview on the red carpet of the Keep Memory Alive's 'Power of Love Gala' Twain announced the idea of a return to Las Vegas, after the end of the Now Tour. The singer watched several shows, including Gwen Stefani's Vegas performance at Zappos Theater and said: "I'll be singing somewhere, I wonder where this is going to be". During the same interview, Twain said she expected to announce the new show in June 2019.

On June 17, 2019, the singer appeared on Good Morning America to announce her second two-year Las Vegas residency, "Let's Go!". According to a press release, Twain is the creative director of the residency, which takes inspiration from her classic music videos and her 2018 tour. The residency's title is a play on the opening line of two of Twain's most famous songs, "Man! I Feel Like A Woman!" and "I'm Gonna Getcha Good!"

I get to settle down with a great production and have a party, so I'm gonna theme the show after a party. It's time to party!" Twain told ET Canada.

Ticket sales started on June 21 at 10AM PT, though pre-sales available on June 20. Ticket prices started at $60 plus taxes and fees, and $1 from each ticket is donated to Twain's children-focused charity, Shania Kids Can. All shows took place at the Zappos Theater at Planet Hollywood Resort & Casino.

Following her March 14, 2020 show, further set dates were postponed until further notice due to the COVID-19 pandemic.

== Set list ==
This set list is representative of the show on December 6, 2019. It is not representative of all concerts for the duration of the residency.

1. "Rock This Country!"
2. "Love Gets Me Every Time"
3. "Life's About to Get Good"
4. "Up!" (Pop version)
5. "Don't Be Stupid (You Know I Love You)"
6. "Come on Over"
7. "White Christmas"
8. "No One Needs to Know"
9. "You're Still the One"
10. "You Win My Love"
11. "That Don't Impress Me Much"
12. "Any Man of Mine"
13. "Whose Bed Have Your Boots Been Under?"
14. "Honey, I'm Home"
15. "I'm Gonna Getcha Good!"
16. "Party for Two"
17. "Forever and for Always"
18. "Swingin' with My Eyes Closed"
19. "(If You're Not in It for Love) I'm Outta Here!"
20. "From This Moment On"
21. "Man! I Feel Like a Woman!"

== Shows ==
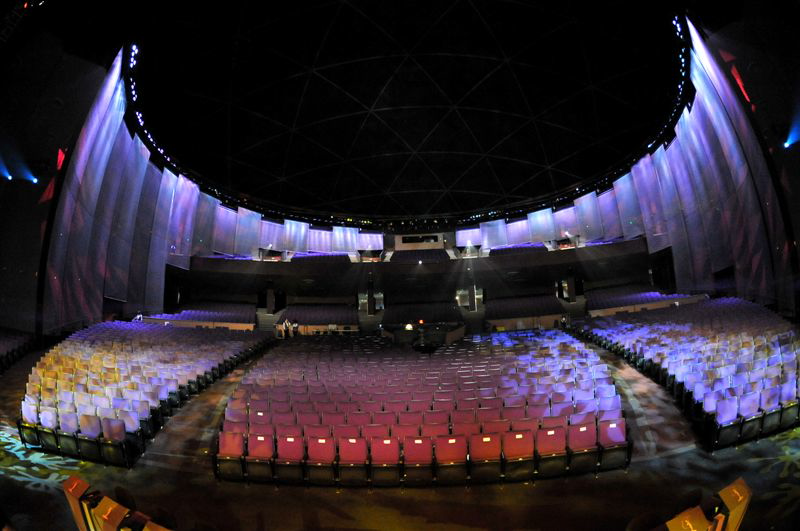
Zappos Theater, the venue of the residency

List of performances showing date, attendance, and gross revenue
Date	Attendance	Revenue
Leg 1
December 6, 2019	23,498 / 24,989 (94%)	$2,977,650
December 7, 2019	23,498 / 24,989 (94%)	$2,977,650
December 11, 2019	23,498 / 24,989 (94%)	$2,977,650
December 13, 2019	23,498 / 24,989 (94%)	$2,977,650
December 14, 2019	23,498 / 24,989 (94%)	$2,977,650
December 18, 2019	23,498 / 24,989 (94%)	$2,977,650
Leg 2
March 13, 2020	8,101 / 8,651 (94%)	$1,098,348
March 14, 2020	8,101 / 8,651 (94%)	$1,098,348
Leg 3
December 2, 2021	25,069 / 25,950 (97%)	$3,331,758
December 4, 2021	25,069 / 25,950 (97%)	$3,331,758
December 5, 2021	25,069 / 25,950 (97%)	$3,331,758
December 9, 2021	25,069 / 25,950 (97%)	$3,331,758
December 11, 2021	25,069 / 25,950 (97%)	$3,331,758
December 12, 2021	25,069 / 25,950 (97%)	$3,331,758
Leg 4
February 11, 2022	37,494 / 39,150 (96%)	$4,766,605
February 12, 2022	37,494 / 39,150 (96%)	$4,766,605
February 14, 2022	37,494 / 39,150 (96%)	$4,766,605
February 18, 2022	37,494 / 39,150 (96%)	$4,766,605
February 19, 2022	37,494 / 39,150 (96%)	$4,766,605
February 23, 2022	37,494 / 39,150 (96%)	$4,766,605
February 25, 2022	37,494 / 39,150 (96%)	$4,766,605
February 26, 2022	37,494 / 39,150 (96%)	$4,766,605
Leg 5
June 10, 2022	—N/a	—N/a
June 11, 2022	—N/a	—N/a
June 15, 2022	—N/a	—N/a
June 17, 2022	—N/a	—N/a
June 18, 2022	—N/a	—N/a
June 22, 2022 (Note: Originally June 3, 2022.)	—N/a	—N/a
June 24, 2022 (Note: Originally June 4, 2022.)	—N/a	—N/a
June 25, 2022 (Note: Originally June 8, 2022.)	—N/a	—N/a
Leg 6
August 26, 2022	—N/a	—N/a
August 27, 2022	—N/a	—N/a
August 31, 2022	—N/a	—N/a
September 2, 2022	—N/a	—N/a
September 3, 2022	—N/a	—N/a
September 7, 2022	—N/a	—N/a
September 9, 2022	—N/a	—N/a
September 10, 2022	—N/a	—N/a
Total	94,162 / 98,740 (95%)	$12,174,361

== Cancelled shows ==
List of cancelled performances
Date	Reason for cancellation
March 18, 2020	COVID-19 pandemic
March 20, 2020	COVID-19 pandemic
March 21, 2020	COVID-19 pandemic
March 25, 2020	COVID-19 pandemic
March 27, 2020	COVID-19 pandemic
March 28, 2020	COVID-19 pandemic
May 20, 2020	COVID-19 pandemic
May 22, 2020	COVID-19 pandemic
May 23, 2020	COVID-19 pandemic
May 27, 2020	COVID-19 pandemic
May 29, 2020	COVID-19 pandemic
May 30, 2020	COVID-19 pandemic
June 3, 2020	COVID-19 pandemic
June 5, 2020	COVID-19 pandemic
June 6, 2020	COVID-19 pandemic
August 21, 2020	COVID-19 pandemic
August 22, 2020	COVID-19 pandemic
August 26, 2020	COVID-19 pandemic
August 28, 2020	COVID-19 pandemic
August 29, 2020	COVID-19 pandemic
September 2, 2020	COVID-19 pandemic
September 5, 2020	COVID-19 pandemic
September 6, 2020	COVID-19 pandemic
December 2, 2020	COVID-19 pandemic
December 4, 2020	COVID-19 pandemic
December 5, 2020	COVID-19 pandemic
December 9, 2020	COVID-19 pandemic
December 11, 2020	COVID-19 pandemic
December 12, 2020	COVID-19 pandemic

== See also ==
- Shania: Still the One
