= Giddy Up! =

2023 single by Shania Twain

Single by Shania Twain

from the album Queen of Me
- Released: January 5, 2023
- Studio: 8 World Studios (London, England)
- Genre: Country pop; dance-pop
- Length: 2:42
- Label: Republic
- Songwriter(s): Shania Twain; Samuel Romans; Jessica Agombar; David Stewart
- Producer(s): David Stewart

Shania Twain singles chronology
"Waking Up Dreaming" (2022)	"Giddy Up!" (2023)	"Unhealthy" (2023)

Music video
- "Giddy Up!" on YouTube

"Giddy Up!" is a song by Canadian singer Shania Twain. It was released on January 5, 2023, by Republic Records as the second single from her sixth studio album Queen of Me (2023). The song was written by Twain, Romans, Jessica Agombar, and David Stewart and produced by the latter.

== Background ==
Twain wanted the phrase "Giddy Up!" to evoke similar positive emotions as her famous line "Let's Go Girls!" from her 1999 hit "Man! I Feel Like a Woman!". She remarked that she wanted to "set a celebratory tone and ‘Giddy up!’ is a way to call to the audience and say 'let's get ready for some fun,'" while adding that the lines came to her while "thinking about how to put a little 'pep in my step'".

== Critical reception ==
Edward Segarra of USA Today called the song a "country-pop banger," noting its "infectious chorus". Rachel DeSantis of People described the song as a "catchy tune". Mary Siroky of Consequence Sound named "Giddy Up!" the outlet's song of the week for January 6, 2023, noting Twain's "voice and undeniably charismatic touch". Hattie Lindert of A.V. Club stated that the track "can sound 'Old Navy commercial' at times," but nonetheless, it "embodies the hope and levity of Twain’s catalog, and finds her nostalgic and grateful for her dollar-and-a-dream roots". Madeleine O'Connell of Country Now said that the song "summons [Twain's] classic fun-loving sound and striking vocal range," adding that it is "yet another irresistible track for the dance floor". Cillea Houghton of American Songwriter stated that "Giddy Up!" is "sure to be a crowd-pleaser during [Twain's] live show," adding that it "continues to stay in feel-good energy" like her previous single "Waking Up Dreaming".

== Music video ==
The official music video for "Giddy Up!" premiered on January 5, 2023. It was directed by Justin Marmorstein of Marmo Films and features dance scenes shot in multiple locations, including a diner, a bar, a grocery store, and a honky tonk. In each location, people break out into a choreographed dance. Twain promoted the video on social media by sharing a behind-the-scenes video of her attempting to work on an engine of a car.

== Charts ==
=== Weekly charts ===
Weekly chart performance for "Giddy Up!"
Chart (2023)	Peak position
Australia Country Hot 50 (The Music)	16
Australia Digital Tracks (ARIA)	9
Canada (Canadian Hot 100)	70
Canada Country (Billboard)	43
New Zealand Hot Singles (RMNZ)	17
Slovakia (Rádio Top 100)	67
UK Singles Downloads (OCC)	27
US Adult Contemporary (Billboard)	10
US Country Digital Song Sales (Billboard)	13
US Digital Song Sales (Billboard)	36

=== Year-end charts ===
Year-end chart performance for "Giddy Up!"
Chart (2023)	Position
US Adult Contemporary (Billboard)	29
