= Waking Up Dreaming =

2022 single by Shania Twain

Single by Shania Twain

from the album Queen of Me
- Released: September 23, 2022
- Studio: 8 World Studios (London, England); Republic Studios (Los Angeles, CA)
- Genre: Pop rock; country pop; dance-pop; electropop
- Length: 3:18
- Label: Republic
- Songwriters: Jessica Agombar; David Stewart; Shania Twain
- Producer: David Stewart

Shania Twain singles chronology
"Forever and Ever, Amen" (2021)	"Waking Up Dreaming" (2022)	"Giddy Up!" (2023)

Music video
- "Waking Up Dreaming" on YouTube

"Waking Up Dreaming" is a song co-written and recorded by Canadian singer Shania Twain, and released on September 23, 2022, and serves as the lead single from Twain's sixth studio album, Queen of Me (2023). The song was written by Jessica Agombar, David Stewart, and Twain.

== Release ==
The song premiered on September 23, 2022, on BBC Radio 2 and was released to streaming and music purchasing platforms on the same day. It was the first single by Twain being released via the new record label Republic Nashville. Twain commented: "I couldn't think of a better partner than Republic Nashville. I'm honored and excited to be the label's first artist and lead the charge of this new and exciting chapter. In this respect, it feels like a new beginning all around, and I'm embracing it wholeheartedly."

== Music video ==
The music video for "Waking Up Dreaming" was released on September 23, 2022, and depicts Twain as a 80s rockstar performing the song in extravagant rock fantasy clothing. The video was directed by Isaac Rentz.

== Live performance ==
Twain debuted the song live for the first time as part of a medley during her performance at the People's Choice Awards 2022. After the performance she received the music icon award.

== Charts ==
=== Weekly charts ===
Weekly chart performance for "Waking Up Dreaming"
Chart (2022–2023)	Peak position
Australia Digital Tracks (ARIA)	24
Canada Hot 100 (Billboard)	72
UK Singles Downloads (OCC)	18
US Adult Contemporary (Billboard)	11
US Country Digital Song Sales (Billboard)	10
US Digital Song Sales (Billboard)	32

=== Year-end charts ===
Year-end chart performance for "Waking Up Dreaming"
Chart (2023)	Position
US Adult Contemporary (Billboard)	37
